= List of municipalities of the Province of Bergamo =

This is a list of the 243 municipalities (comuni) of the Province of Bergamo in the region of Lombardy in Italy.

== List ==
Municipality	Population (2026)	Area (km²)	Density
Adrara San Martino	2,213	12.61	175.5
Adrara San Rocco	816	9.23	88.4
Albano Sant'Alessandro	8,342	5.35	1,559.3
Albino	17,588	31.81	552.9
Algua	698	8.32	83.9
Almè	5,483	2.00	2,741.5
Almenno San Bartolomeo	6,630	10.61	624.9
Almenno San Salvatore	5,502	4.73	1,163.2
Alzano Lombardo	13,379	13.68	978.0
Ambivere	2,334	3.28	711.6
Antegnate	3,456	9.73	355.2
Arcene	5,112	4.35	1,175.2
Ardesio	3,239	54.44	59.5
Arzago d'Adda	2,767	9.31	297.2
Averara	179	10.69	16.7
Aviatico	593	8.49	69.8
Azzano San Paolo	7,725	4.29	1,800.7
Azzone	351	17.29	20.3
Bagnatica	4,448	6.55	679.1
Barbata	695	7.98	87.1
Bariano	4,332	7.07	612.7
Barzana	2,039	2.07	985.0
Bedulita	712	4.27	166.7
Berbenno	2,526	6.14	411.4
Bergamo	120,629	40.16	3,003.7
Berzo San Fermo	1,456	5.86	248.5
Bianzano	642	6.67	96.3
Blello	71	2.20	32.3
Bolgare	6,731	8.59	783.6
Boltiere	6,185	4.21	1,469.1
Bonate Sopra	10,652	6.15	1,732.0
Bonate Sotto	6,645	6.47	1,027.0
Borgo di Terzo	1,225	1.83	669.4
Bossico	965	7.09	136.1
Bottanuco	5,085	5.77	881.3
Bracca	705	5.47	128.9
Branzi	612	26.19	23.4
Brembate	8,745	5.54	1,578.5
Brembate di Sopra	8,068	4.14	1,948.8
Brignano Gera d'Adda	6,267	12.11	517.5
Brumano	135	8.14	16.6
Brusaporto	5,704	4.99	1,143.1
Calcinate	6,254	15.08	414.7
Calcio	5,551	15.67	354.2
Calusco d'Adda	8,432	8.33	1,012.2
Calvenzano	4,535	6.72	674.9
Camerata Cornello	545	12.94	42.1
Canonica d'Adda	4,293	3.21	1,337.4
Capizzone	1,235	4.68	263.9
Capriate San Gervasio	8,316	5.78	1,438.8
Caprino Bergamasco	3,087	8.78	351.6
Caravaggio	16,513	33.39	494.5
Carobbio degli Angeli	4,912	6.82	720.2
Carona	282	44.15	6.4
Carvico	4,700	4.59	1,024.0
Casazza	3,843	7.11	540.5
Casirate d'Adda	4,139	10.17	407.0
Casnigo	3,005	13.62	220.6
Cassiglio	105	13.68	7.7
Castel Rozzone	2,855	1.71	1,669.6
Castelli Calepio	10,484	10.15	1,032.9
Castione della Presolana	3,381	42.50	79.6
Castro	1,191	2.59	459.8
Cavernago	2,974	7.65	388.8
Cazzano Sant'Andrea	1,694	2.02	838.6
Cenate Sopra	2,551	6.97	366.0
Cenate Sotto	4,001	4.62	866.0
Cene	4,044	8.60	470.2
Cerete	1,643	14.07	116.8
Chignolo d'Isola	3,383	5.55	609.5
Chiuduno	6,260	6.88	909.9
Cisano Bergamasco	6,232	7.82	796.9
Ciserano	5,843	5.31	1,100.4
Cividate al Piano	5,099	9.73	524.0
Clusone	8,596	26.19	328.2
Colere	1,077	18.63	57.8
Cologno al Serio	11,287	18.52	609.4
Colzate	1,641	6.75	243.1
Comun Nuovo	4,471	6.45	693.2
Corna Imagna	918	4.50	204.0
Cornalba	305	9.25	33.0
Cortenuova	1,981	7.35	269.5
Costa di Mezzate	3,428	5.22	656.7
Costa Serina	910	12.30	74.0
Costa Valle Imagna	547	4.21	129.9
Costa Volpino	8,792	18.67	470.9
Covo	4,368	12.94	337.6
Credaro	3,561	3.41	1,044.3
Curno	7,574	4.70	1,611.5
Cusio	197	9.41	20.9
Dalmine	23,818	11.81	2,016.8
Dossena	878	19.56	44.9
Endine Gaiano	3,462	21.07	164.3
Entratico	2,025	4.15	488.0
Fara Gera d'Adda	8,080	10.79	748.8
Fara Olivana con Sola	1,345	5.04	266.9
Filago	3,130	5.42	577.5
Fino del Monte	1,135	4.29	264.6
Fiorano al Serio	2,938	1.06	2,771.7
Fontanella	4,914	17.80	276.1
Fonteno	550	10.93	50.3
Foppolo	152	16.14	9.4
Foresto Sparso	3,133	7.87	398.1
Fornovo San Giovanni	3,424	7.04	486.4
Fuipiano Valle Imagna	203	4.28	47.4
Gandellino	936	25.13	37.2
Gandino	5,182	29.03	178.5
Gandosso	1,446	3.13	462.0
Gaverina Terme	899	5.20	172.9
Gazzaniga	4,976	14.41	345.3
Ghisalba	6,256	10.59	590.7
Gorlago	5,182	5.70	909.1
Gorle	6,572	2.52	2,607.9
Gorno	1,429	10.00	142.9
Grassobbio	6,547	8.74	749.1
Gromo	1,142	20.07	56.9
Grone	938	7.78	120.6
Grumello del Monte	7,675	9.94	772.1
Isola di Fondra	172	12.83	13.4
Isso	635	5.06	125.5
Lallio	4,254	2.16	1,969.4
Leffe	4,313	6.69	644.7
Lenna	549	12.74	43.1
Levate	3,740	5.53	676.3
Locatello	812	3.79	214.2
Lovere	4,943	7.92	624.1
Lurano	2,893	4.05	714.3
Luzzana	912	3.48	262.1
Madone	4,211	3.07	1,371.7
Mapello	7,039	8.66	812.8
Martinengo	11,172	22.05	506.7
Medolago	2,381	3.80	626.6
Mezzoldo	170	18.84	9.0
Misano di Gera d'Adda	3,058	6.11	500.5
Moio de' Calvi	199	6.36	31.3
Monasterolo del Castello	1,153	8.75	131.8
Montello	3,267	1.82	1,795.1
Morengo	2,486	9.57	259.8
Mornico al Serio	3,052	6.92	441.0
Mozzanica	4,434	9.46	468.7
Mozzo	7,233	3.64	1,987.1
Nembro	11,284	15.24	740.4
Olmo al Brembo	453	7.90	57.3
Oltre il Colle	920	32.89	28.0
Oltressenda Alta	135	17.33	7.8
Oneta	583	18.66	31.2
Onore	977	11.78	82.9
Orio al Serio	1,588	3.04	522.4
Ornica	126	15.10	8.3
Osio Sopra	5,195	5.18	1,002.9
Osio Sotto	12,892	7.59	1,698.6
Pagazzano	2,238	5.24	427.1
Paladina	3,946	2.09	1,888.0
Palazzago	4,597	13.96	329.3
Palosco	5,730	10.79	531.0
Parre	2,650	22.28	118.9
Parzanica	333	9.82	33.9
Pedrengo	5,911	3.60	1,641.9
Peia	1,663	4.48	371.2
Pianico	1,456	2.70	539.3
Piario	1,000	1.55	645.2
Piazza Brembana	1,195	6.77	176.5
Piazzatorre	396	24.24	16.3
Piazzolo	92	4.15	22.2
Pognano	1,606	3.29	488.1
Ponte Nossa	1,798	5.59	321.6
Ponte San Pietro	12,007	4.59	2,615.9
Ponteranica	6,731	8.48	793.8
Pontida	3,299	10.38	317.8
Pontirolo Nuovo	5,046	11.10	454.6
Pradalunga	4,494	8.20	548.0
Predore	1,847	10.96	168.5
Premolo	1,064	17.63	60.4
Presezzo	4,790	2.28	2,100.9
Pumenengo	1,731	10.12	171.0
Ranica	5,828	4.06	1,435.5
Ranzanico	1,217	7.21	168.8
Riva di Solto	843	8.52	98.9
Rogno	3,854	15.81	243.8
Romano di Lombardia	21,049	19.38	1,086.1
Roncobello	421	25.39	16.6
Roncola	901	5.07	177.7
Rota d'Imagna	940	6.03	155.9
Rovetta	4,150	24.53	169.2
San Giovanni Bianco	4,569	31.03	147.2
San Paolo d'Argon	5,938	5.25	1,131.0
San Pellegrino Terme	4,597	22.95	200.3
Sant'Omobono Terme	3,953	16.43	240.6
Santa Brigida	517	13.80	37.5
Sarnico	6,858	6.66	1,029.7
Scanzorosciate	10,168	10.69	951.2
Schilpario	1,136	63.97	17.8
Sedrina	2,361	5.85	403.6
Selvino	1,961	6.53	300.3
Seriate	25,857	12.53	2,063.6
Serina	2,107	27.34	77.1
Solto Collina	1,836	11.76	156.1
Solza	2,009	1.23	1,633.3
Songavazzo	732	12.94	56.6
Sorisole	8,757	12.25	714.9
Sotto il Monte Giovanni XXIII	4,431	5.02	882.7
Sovere	5,310	18.02	294.7
Spinone al Lago	1,006	1.97	510.7
Spirano	5,737	9.61	597.0
Stezzano	13,904	9.37	1,483.9
Strozza	1,093	3.83	285.4
Suisio	3,785	4.54	833.7
Taleggio	537	47.13	11.4
Tavernola Bergamasca	1,918	11.17	171.7
Telgate	5,025	8.30	605.4
Terno d'Isola	7,976	4.13	1,931.2
Torre Boldone	8,721	3.48	2,506.0
Torre de' Busi	2,321	8.97	258.8
Torre de' Roveri	2,614	2.69	971.7
Torre Pallavicina	1,154	10.62	108.7
Trescore Balneario	9,922	13.51	734.4
Treviglio	31,604	32.22	980.9
Treviolo	10,923	8.49	1,286.6
Ubiale Clanezzo	1,316	7.35	179.0
Urgnano	10,140	14.78	686.1
Val Brembilla	4,114	31.44	130.9
Valbondione	941	96.89	9.7
Valbrembo	4,299	3.80	1,131.3
Valgoglio	554	31.89	17.4
Valleve	129	14.76	8.7
Valnegra	198	2.23	88.8
Valtorta	228	30.90	7.4
Vedeseta	196	19.29	10.2
Verdellino	7,843	3.82	2,053.1
Verdello	8,212	7.34	1,118.8
Vertova	4,457	15.69	284.1
Viadanica	1,121	5.45	205.7
Vigano San Martino	1,400	3.76	372.3
Vigolo	571	12.31	46.4
Villa d'Adda	4,580	5.98	765.9
Villa d'Almè	6,428	6.49	990.4
Villa d'Ogna	1,784	5.16	345.7
Villa di Serio	6,490	4.60	1,410.9
Villongo	8,169	6.04	1,352.5
Vilminore di Scalve	1,423	41.00	34.7
Zandobbio	2,737	6.43	425.7
Zanica	8,839	14.95	591.2
Zogno	8,590	35.21	244.0

== See also ==
- List of municipalities of Lombardy
- List of municipalities of Italy
