= Piazzola =

Piazzola may refer to:

- Piazzola sul Brenta, a municipality in Veneto, Italy
- Astor Piazzolla (1921–1992), Argentine tango composer, bandoneon player, and arranger
- Margherita Piazzola Beloch (1879–1976), Italian mathematician
- Prospero da Piazzola (fl. 1472–1521), Italian painter active in Padua

== See also ==
- Pianzola (disambiguation)
- Piazzolla (disambiguation)
- Piazzole
- Piazzoli
- Piazzolo
