= Piazzoli =

Piazzoli is an Italian surname from Bergamo. Notable people with the surname include:

- Louis Piazzoli (1845–1904), Italian Roman Catholic prelate, Apostolic Vicar of Hong Kong
- Roberto D'Ettorre Piazzoli (born 1942), Italian film producer and cinematographer

== See also ==
- Piazzola
- Piazzole
- Piazzolo
