= Simone Pianetti =

Italian anarchist and mass murderer

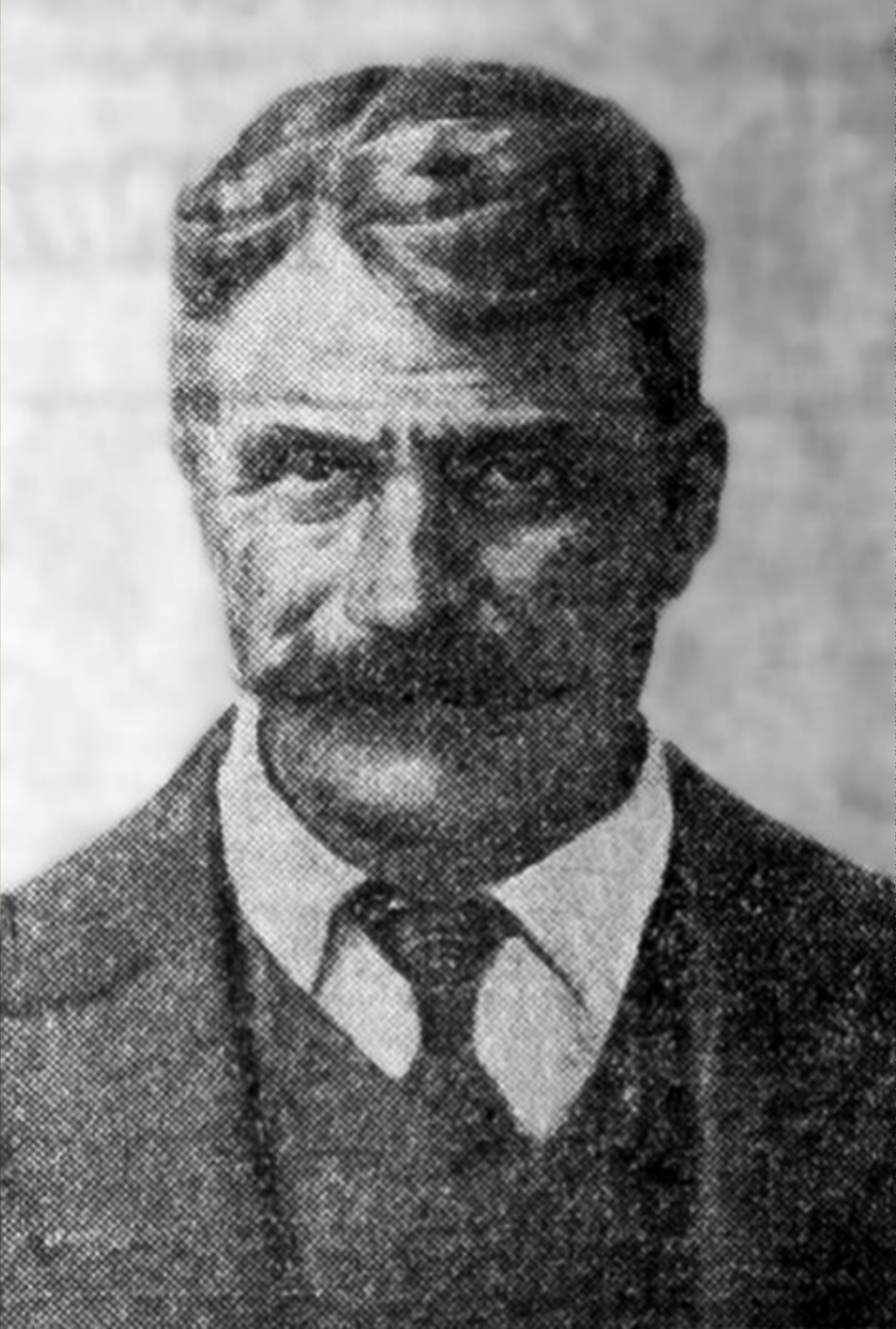
Simone Pianetti

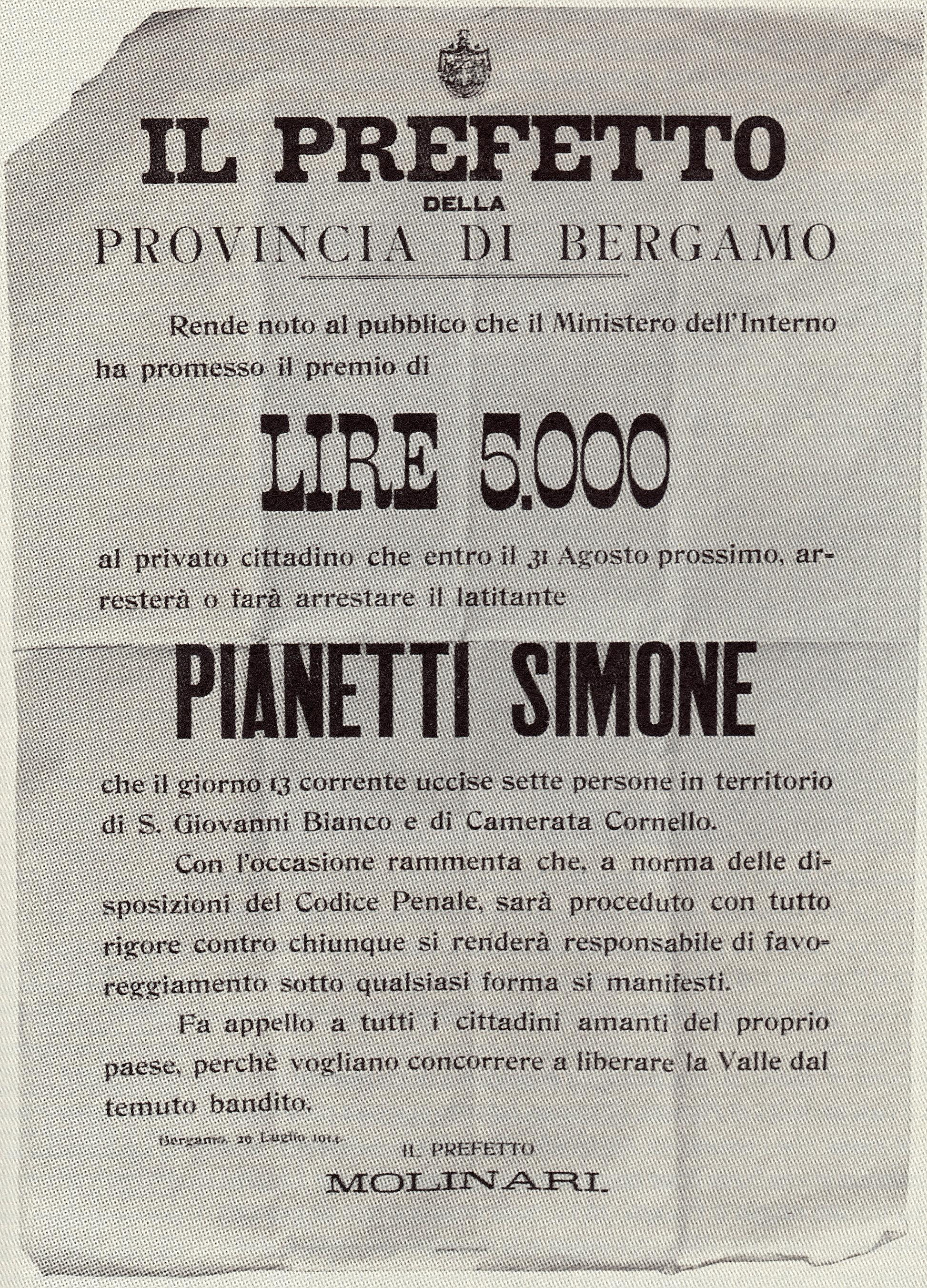
Wanted poster published 29 July 1914

Simone Pianetti (7 February 1858 – unknown) was an Italian liberal and mass murderer.

== Biography ==
Pianetti was born in Camerata Cornello, Lombardy, Austrian Empire. The area came under the control of Italian forces when he was still an infant and was made part of the Kingdom of Italy when it was formed in 1861. At a young age, he unsuccessfully attempted to kill his father over a legacy question. For unknown reasons he was not charged and in an agreement with the local chief of the Carabinieri, he left Italy and went to the United States of America. After some years in the US he returned to Italy with a ticket paid for by his father. Back in his village, he married a woman named Carlotta who gave birth to seven children. Pianetti opened a small restaurant where customers were also allowed to dance. Because the local parish priest and other church people did not agree with dancing in Pianetti's restaurant, the municipality forced him to close it. He subsequently opened an electric-powered mill which was also unsuccessful.

Pianetti was the only person in the village who did not attend church on Sundays. He had grown to think that everyone in Camerata Cornello hated him, which supposedly led him to his killing spree.

== The killings ==
On the morning of 13 July 1914, Pianetti used his rifle to shoot and kill 7 people:

- Domenico Morali, doctor
- Abramo Giudici, the manager of the municipality
- Valeria Giudici, daughter of the previous
- Giovanni Ghilardi, shoemaker
- Stefano Filippi, priest
- Giovanni Giupponi, a layman
- Caterina Milesi, a farmer

Soon after the killings, Pianetti left the village and reached Monte Cancervo, where he lived for some days, despite a search by 200 people from the Carabinieri, the Polizia di Stato and a company of the 78th infantry regiment. Pianetti fired at some Carabinieri to escape into the mountains near the villages of Olmo al Brembo and Cassiglio. He was never arrested and his body was never found. Pianetti's image enjoyed a positive response among Italian and American anarchists, for his actions against the religious establishment and the bigotry of many, especially those in position of preeminence in the society of the time.

== Sources ==
- Riceputi, Felice. Storia della Valle Brembana.
- Bottani, Tarcisio. Banditi e Briganti bergamaschi.
- Ashton-Wolfe, Harry. Crimes of violence and revenge, Pianetti, the chamois hunter.
