= Pianzola =

Surname

Pianzola is an Italian surname. Notable people with the surname include:

- Francesca Pianzola, Swiss athlete of Italian origin
- Francesco Pianzola (1881–1943), Italian Roman Catholic priest

== See also ==
- Piazzola (disambiguation)
- Piazzolla (disambiguation)
