= Lallio =

- Comune
- Comune di Lallio
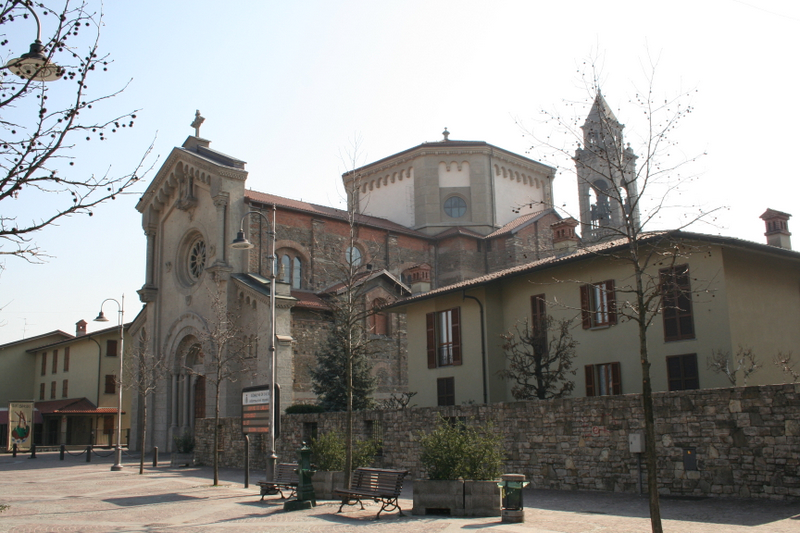
- Church

- Location within Italy Location within Lombardy
- Coordinates: 45°40′N 9°38′E
- Country: Italy
- Region: Lombardy
- Province: Province of Bergamo (BG)

Area
  - Total: 2.1 km^{2} (0.81 sq mi)
- Elevation: 216 m (709 ft)

Population (Dec. 2004)
  - Total: 4,050
  - Density: 1,900/km^{2} (5,000/sq mi)
- Demonym: Lalliesi
- Time zone: UTC+1 (CET)
  - Summer (DST): UTC+2 (CEST)
- Postal code: 24040
- Dialing code: 035
- Website: Official website

Lallio (Bergamasque: Lài) is a comune (municipality) in the Province of Bergamo in the Italian region of Lombardy, located about 45 kilometres (28 mi) northeast of Milan and about 5 kilometres (3.1 mi) southwest of Bergamo. As of 31 December 2004, it had a population of 4,050 and an area of 2.1 square kilometres (0.81 mi^{2}).

Lallio borders the following municipalities: Bergamo, Dalmine, Stezzano, Treviolo.

== Demographic evolution ==
Historical population

Year	Pop.	±%
1861	507	—
1871	546	+7.7%
1881	525	−3.8%
1901	655	+24.8%
1911	760	+16.0%

Year	Pop.	±%
1921	787	+3.6%
1931	831	+5.6%
1936	894	+7.6%
1951	932	+4.3%
1961	1,103	+18.3%

Year	Pop.	±%
1971	1,826	+65.5%
1981	2,182	+19.5%
1991	2,773	+27.1%
2001	3,832	+38.2%

Source: Data from ISTAT

== Companies ==
The company Santini Maglificio Sportivo is based in Lallio, which produces the Santini SMS cycling clothes.

== Twin towns ==
Lallio is twinned with:

- Schöngeising, Germany
