= Monte Venturosa =

Mountain in Lombardy, Italy

- Monte Venturosa seen from Monte Cancervo

Highest point
- Elevation: 1,999 m (6,558 ft)
- Prominence: 476 m (1,562 ft)
- Coordinates: 45°55′47″N 9°36′58″E

Geography
- Location: Lombardy, Italy
- Parent range: Bergamasque Prealps

Monte Venturosa is a mountain of Lombardy, Italy, with an elevation of 1,999 metres (6,558 ft). It is located in the Bergamasque Prealps, in the Province of Bergamo, between the Val Taleggio and the Val Brembana.

Located between Passo Baciamorti and Passo Grialeggio, just north of Monte Cancervo, Monte Venturosa has a rugged look, and is renowned for its views of the Val Brembana, Resegone, and the Grigne group. The peak can be reached through hiking paths, starting from hamlets of Camerata Cornello in Val Brembana or Taleggio in Val Taleggio.

Monte Venturosa lies entirely within the Bergamasque Alps Regional Park.
