= Averara =

- Comune
- Comune di Averara
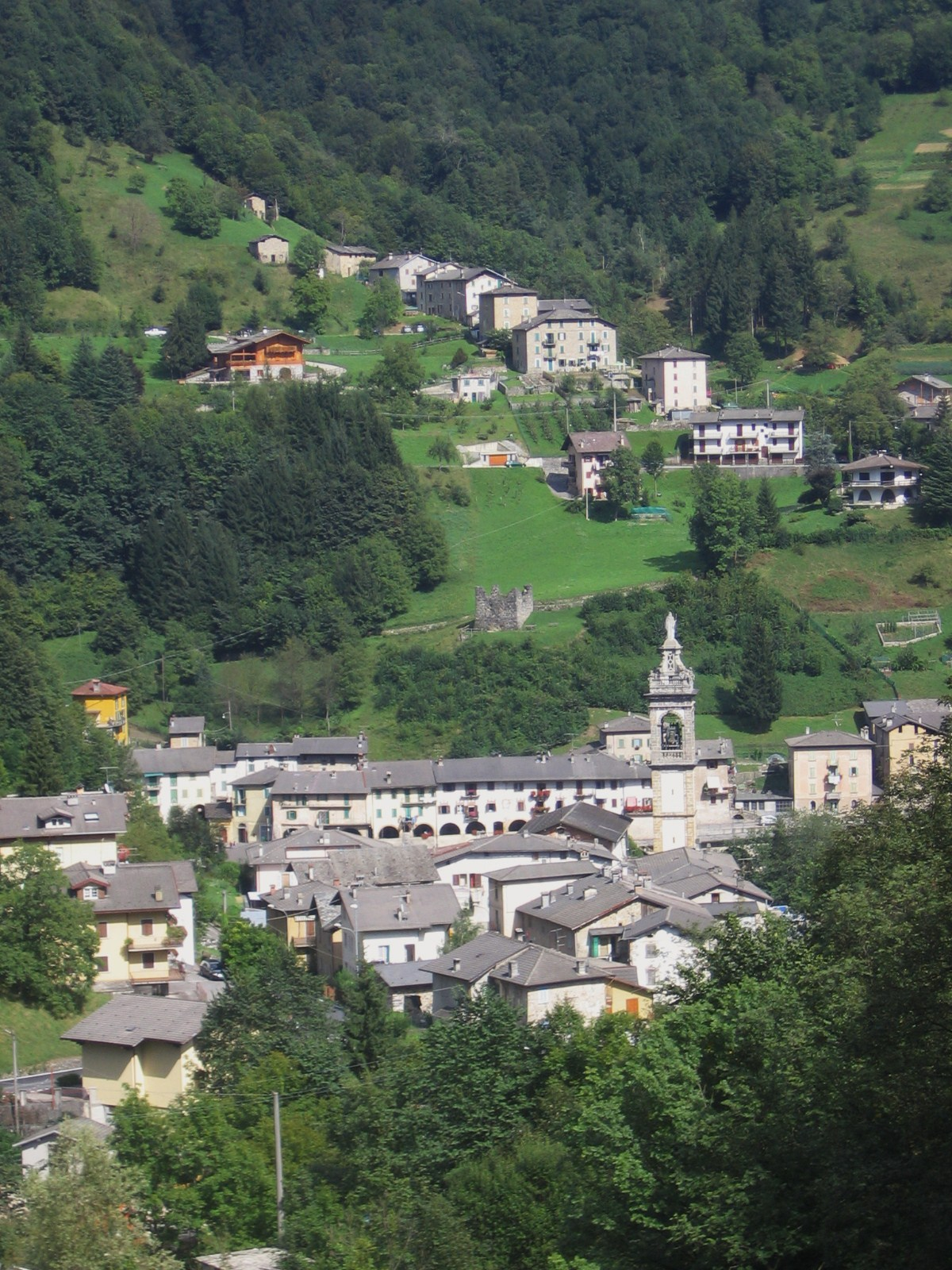
- View of Averara

- Coat of arms

- Location within Italy Location within Lombardy
- Coordinates: 45°59′N 9°38′E
- Country: Italy
- Region: Lombardy
- Province: Province of Bergamo (BG)

Area
  - Total: 10.58 km^{2} (4.08 sq mi)
- Elevation: 650 m (2,130 ft)

Population (2011)
  - Total: 184
  - Density: 17.4/km^{2} (45.0/sq mi)
- Demonym: Averatesi
- Time zone: UTC+1 (CET)
  - Summer (DST): UTC+2 (CEST)
- Postal code: 24010
- Dialing code: 0345
- Patron saint: San Pantaleone
- Saint day: 27 July

Averara (Bergamasque: Vréra) is a comune in the province of Bergamo, in Lombardy, Italy. It is one of the smallest and least populated comunes in the province of Bergamo.

It is surrounded by the following comuni: Bema, Albaredo per San Marco, Mezzoldo, Olmo al Brembo, Santa Brigida and Gerola Alta.

== Coat of arms ==
The coat of arms of Averara shows two brick towers and a golden eagle.
