= Moio de' Calvi =

- Comune
- Comune di Moio de' Calvi
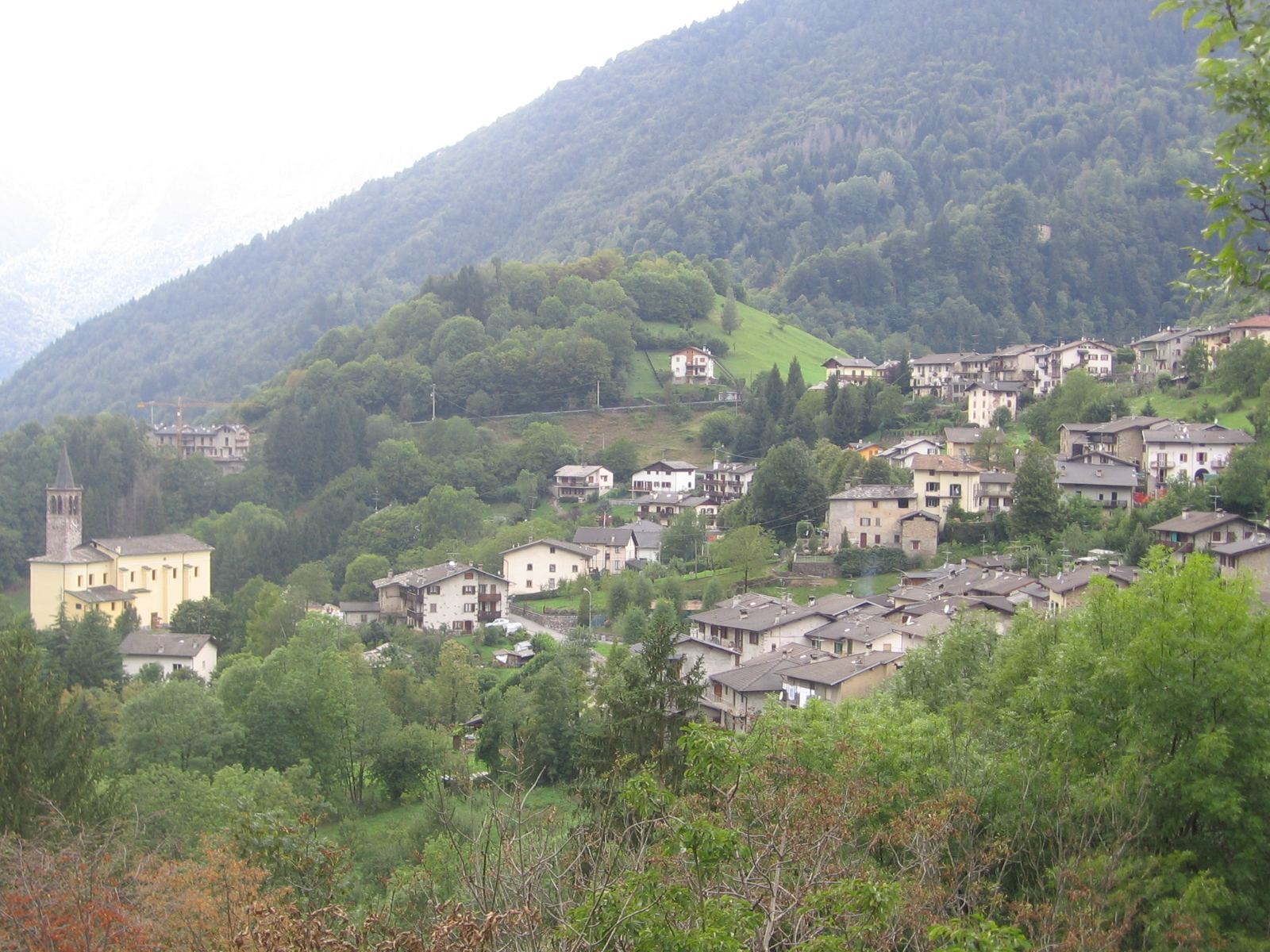
- Moio de' Calvi

- Coat of arms

- Location within Italy Location within Lombardy
- Coordinates: 45°57′N 9°42′E
- Country: Italy
- Region: Lombardy
- Province: Bergamo (BG)
- Frazioni: Costa, Curto, Foppo, Miralago, San Martino de'Calvi

Government
  - Mayor: Davide Calvi

Area
  - Total: 6.2 km^{2} (2.4 sq mi)
- Elevation: 654 m (2,146 ft)

Population (31 December 2010)
  - Total: 208
  - Density: 34/km^{2} (87/sq mi)
- Demonym: Moiesi
- Time zone: UTC+1 (CET)
  - Summer (DST): UTC+2 (CEST)
- Postal code: 24070
- Dialing code: 0345

Moio de' Calvi (Bergamasque: Mòi) is a comune (municipality) in the Province of Bergamo in the Italian region of Lombardy, located about 70 kilometres (43 mi) northeast of Milan and about 30 kilometres (19 mi) north of Bergamo.

Moio de' Calvi borders the following municipalities: Isola di Fondra, Lenna, Piazzatorre, Piazzolo, Roncobello, Valnegra.
