= Albaredo per San Marco =

Albaredo per San Marco Albarii (Lombard)
- Comune
- Comune di Albaredo per San Marco
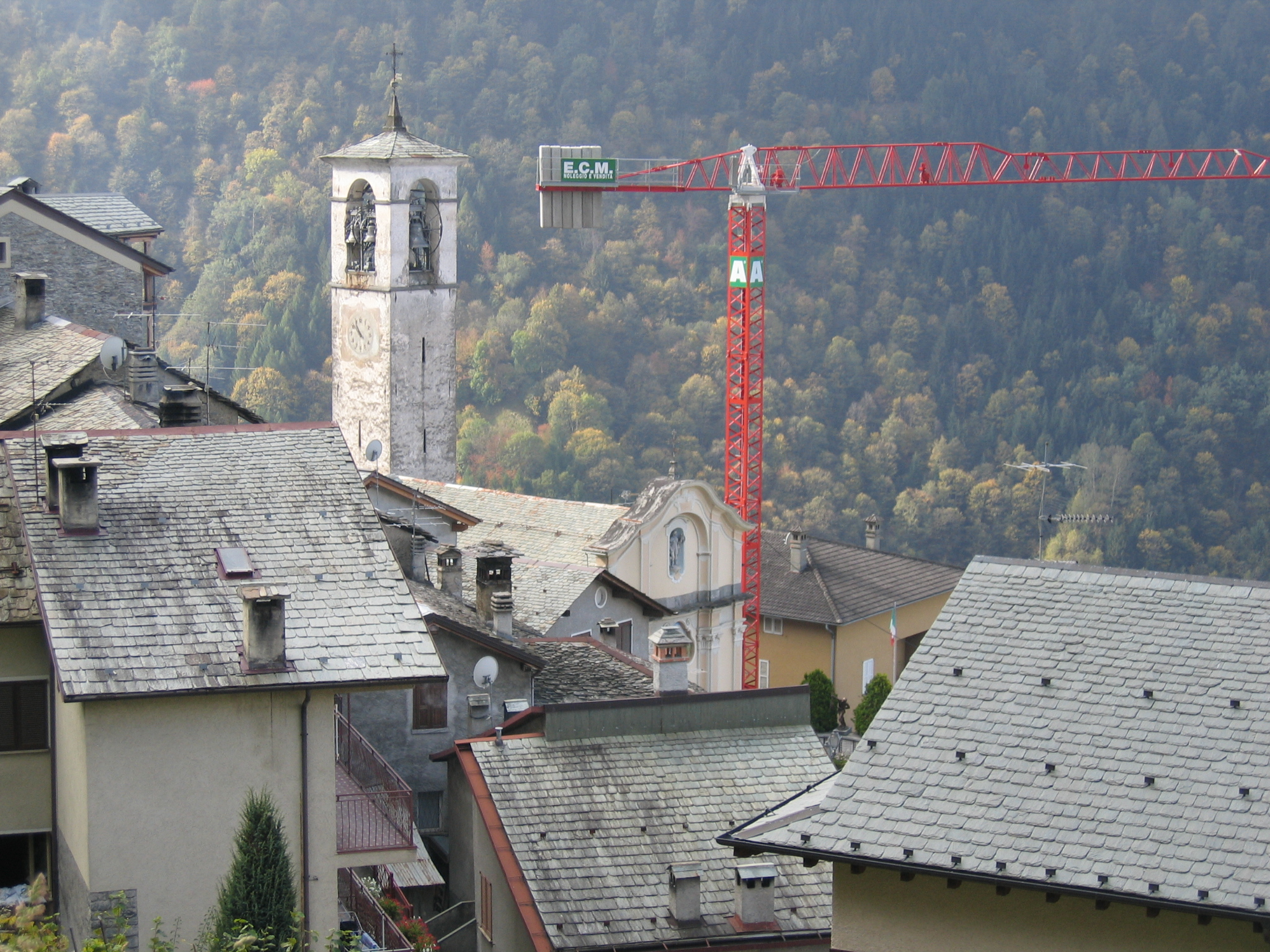
- View of Albaredo per San Marco

- Coat of arms

- Location of Albaredo per San Marco in Italy Albaredo per San Marco (Lombardy)
- Coordinates: 46°6′N 9°35′E
- Country: Italy
- Region: Lombardy
- Province: Sondrio (SO)

Government
  - Mayor: Antonella Furlini

Area
  - Total: 18.96 km^{2} (7.32 sq mi)
- Elevation: 950 m (3,120 ft)

Population (28 February 2017)
  - Total: 304
  - Density: 16.0/km^{2} (41.5/sq mi)
- Demonym: Albaredesi
- Time zone: UTC+1 (CET)
  - Summer (DST): UTC+2 (CEST)
- Postal code: 23010
- Dialing code: 0342
- Patron saint: St. Roch
- Saint day: August 16
- Website: Official website

Albaredo per San Marco (Lombard: Albarii) is a comune (municipality) in the Province of Sondrio in the Italian region of Lombardy, located about 80 kilometres (50 mi) northeast of Milan and about 25 kilometres (16 mi) southwest of Sondrio.

Albaredo is crossed by the road of San Marco Pass. Albaredo per San Marco borders the following municipalities: Averara, Bema, Mezzoldo, Morbegno, Talamona, Tartano.
