= Piazzatorre =

- Comune
- Comune di Piazzatorre
- Coat of arms

- Location of Piazzatorre in Italy Piazzatorre (Lombardy)
- Coordinates: 46°0′N 9°41′E
- Country: Italy
- Region: Lombardy
- Province: Province of Bergamo (BG)

Area
  - Total: 23.6 km^{2} (9.1 sq mi)
- Elevation: 868 m (2,848 ft)

Population (Dec. 2004)
  - Total: 475
  - Density: 20.1/km^{2} (52.1/sq mi)
- Demonym: Piazzatorresi
- Time zone: UTC+1 (CET)
  - Summer (DST): UTC+2 (CEST)
- Postal code: 24010
- Dialing code: 0345

Piazzatorre (Bergamasque: Piassatór) is a comune (municipality) in the Province of Bergamo in the Italian region of Lombardy, located about 70 kilometres (43 mi) northeast of Milan and about 35 kilometres (22 mi) north of Bergamo. As of 31 December 2004, it had a population of 475 and an area of 23.6 square kilometres (9.1 mi^{2}).

Piazzatorre borders the following municipalities: Branzi, Isola di Fondra, Mezzoldo, Moio de' Calvi, Olmo al Brembo, Piazzolo, Valleve.

== Tourism ==
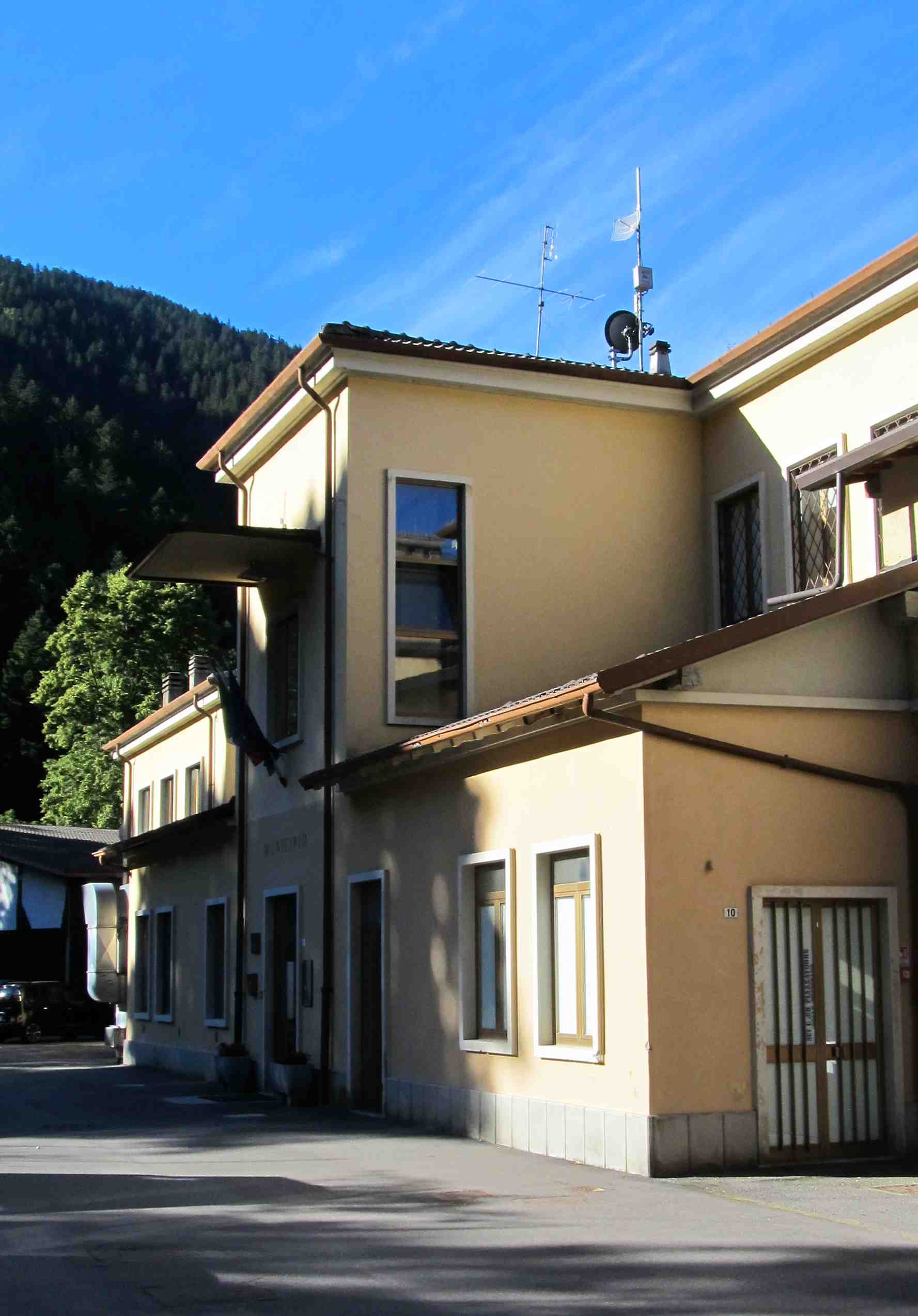
the town Hall

In the territory of Piazzatorre exists the ski area of Torcole.

The first upper-class Milanese tourists began to arrive in Piazzatorre at the beginning of the 20th century. Until the 1940s of the past century there was only summer tourism but due to the development of the Torcole Ski Area, winter tourism began in Piazzatorre.

== Demographic evolution ==
Historical population

| Year | Pop. | ±% |
|---|---|---|
| 1861 | 537 | — |
| 1871 | 263 | −51.0% |
| 1881 | 281 | +6.8% |
| 1901 | 359 | +27.8% |
| 1911 | 391 | +8.9% |

| Year | Pop. | ±% |
|---|---|---|
| 1921 | 415 | +6.1% |
| 1931 | 445 | +7.2% |
| 1936 | 408 | −8.3% |
| 1951 | 500 | +22.5% |
| 1961 | 470 | −6.0% |

| Year | Pop. | ±% |
|---|---|---|
| 1971 | 515 | +9.6% |
| 1981 | 471 | −8.5% |
| 1991 | 502 | +6.6% |
| 2001 | 477 | −5.0% |

Source: Data from ISTAT
