= Valleve =

- Comune
- Comune di Valleve
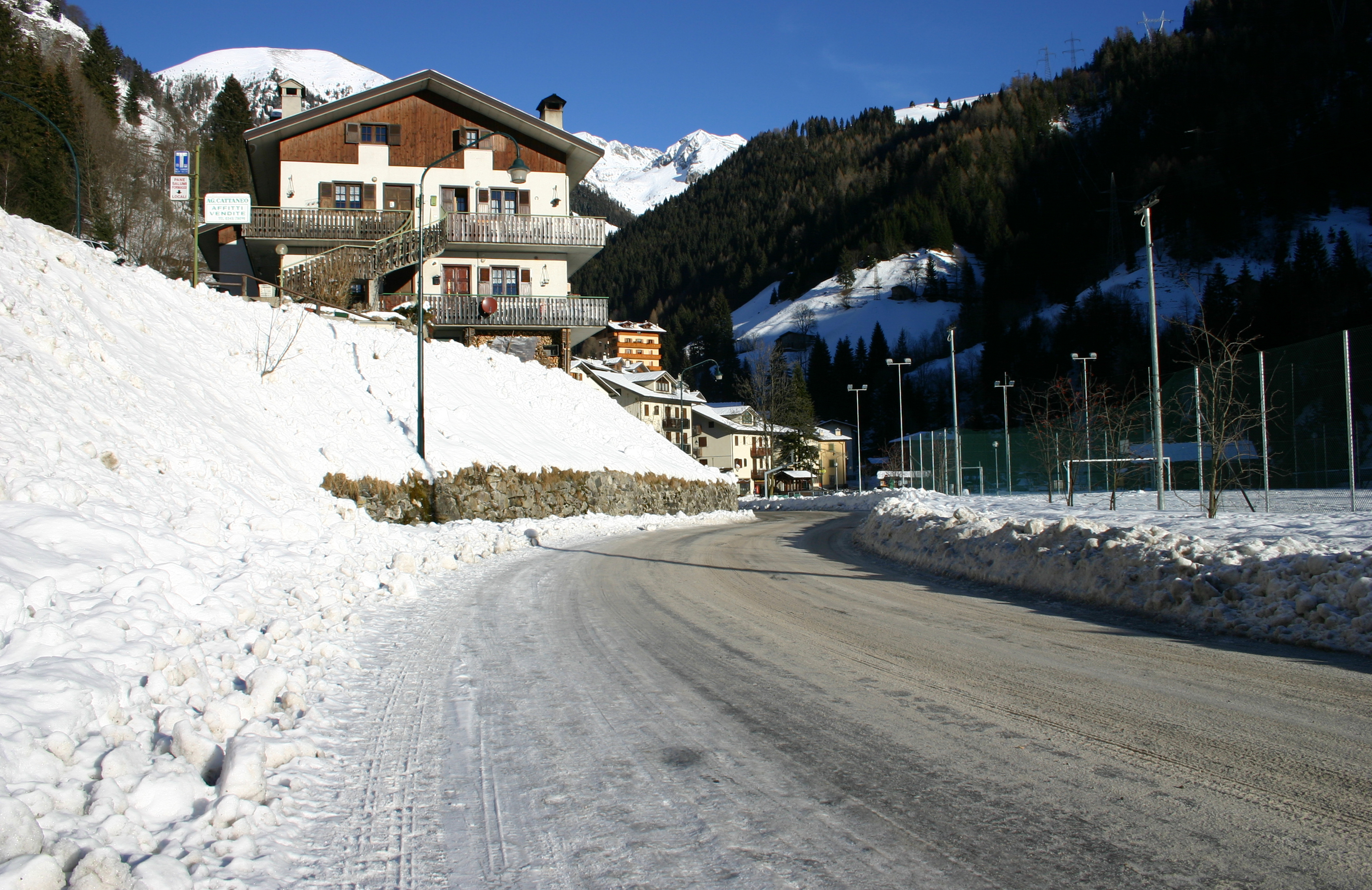
- Valleve

- Coat of arms

- Location within Italy Location within Lombardy
- Coordinates: 46°2′N 9°45′E
- Country: Italy
- Region: Lombardy
- Province: Province of Bergamo (BG)
- Frazioni: San Simone

Area
  - Total: 14.9 km^{2} (5.8 sq mi)
- Elevation: 1,141 m (3,743 ft)

Population (Dec. 2004)
  - Total: 145
  - Density: 9.73/km^{2} (25.2/sq mi)
- Demonym: Vallevesi
- Time zone: UTC+1 (CET)
  - Summer (DST): UTC+2 (CEST)
- Postal code: 24010
- Dialing code: 0345

Valleve (Bergamasque: Valléf or Alév) is a comune (municipality) in the Province of Bergamo in the Italian region of Lombardy, located about 80 kilometres (50 mi) northeast of Milan and about 40 kilometres (25 mi) north of Bergamo. As of 31 December 2004, it had a population of 145 and an area of 14.9 square kilometres (5.8 mi^{2}).

The municipality of Valleve contains the frazione (subdivision) San Simone.

Valleve borders the following municipalities: Branzi, Carona, Foppolo, Mezzoldo, Piazzatorre, Tartano.

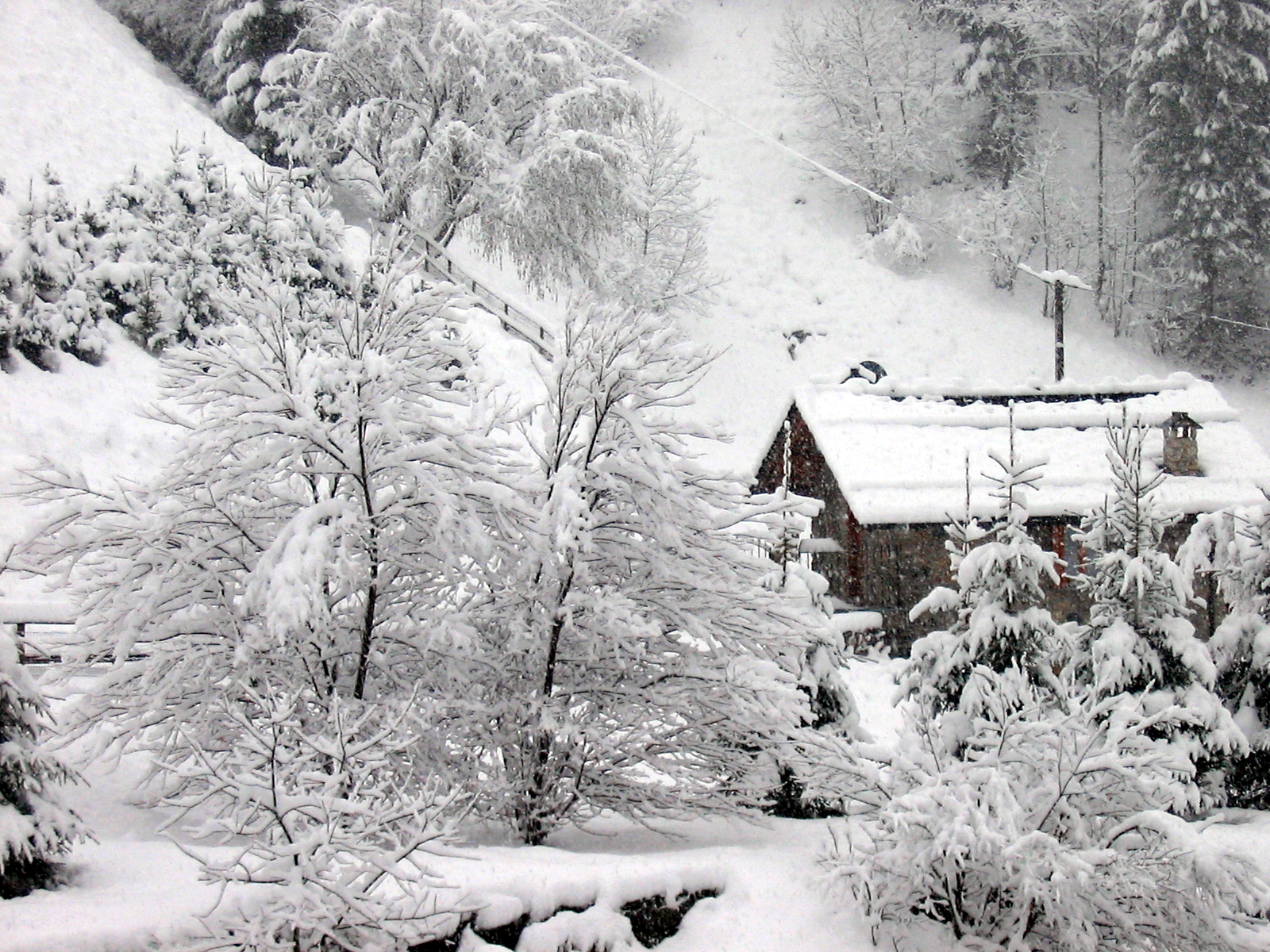
Valleve in winter

== Demographic evolution ==
Historical population

| Year | Pop. | ±% |
|---|---|---|
| 1861 | 395 | — |
| 1871 | 409 | +3.5% |
| 1881 | 375 | −8.3% |
| 1901 | 207 | −44.8% |
| 1911 | 396 | +91.3% |

| Year | Pop. | ±% |
|---|---|---|
| 1921 | 337 | −14.9% |
| 1931 | 336 | −0.3% |
| 1936 | 262 | −22.0% |
| 1951 | 260 | −0.8% |
| 1961 | 220 | −15.4% |

| Year | Pop. | ±% |
|---|---|---|
| 1971 | 206 | −6.4% |
| 1981 | 170 | −17.5% |
| 1991 | 158 | −7.1% |
| 2001 | 158 | +0.0% |

Source: Data from ISTAT
