= Roncobello =

- Comune
- Comune di Roncobello
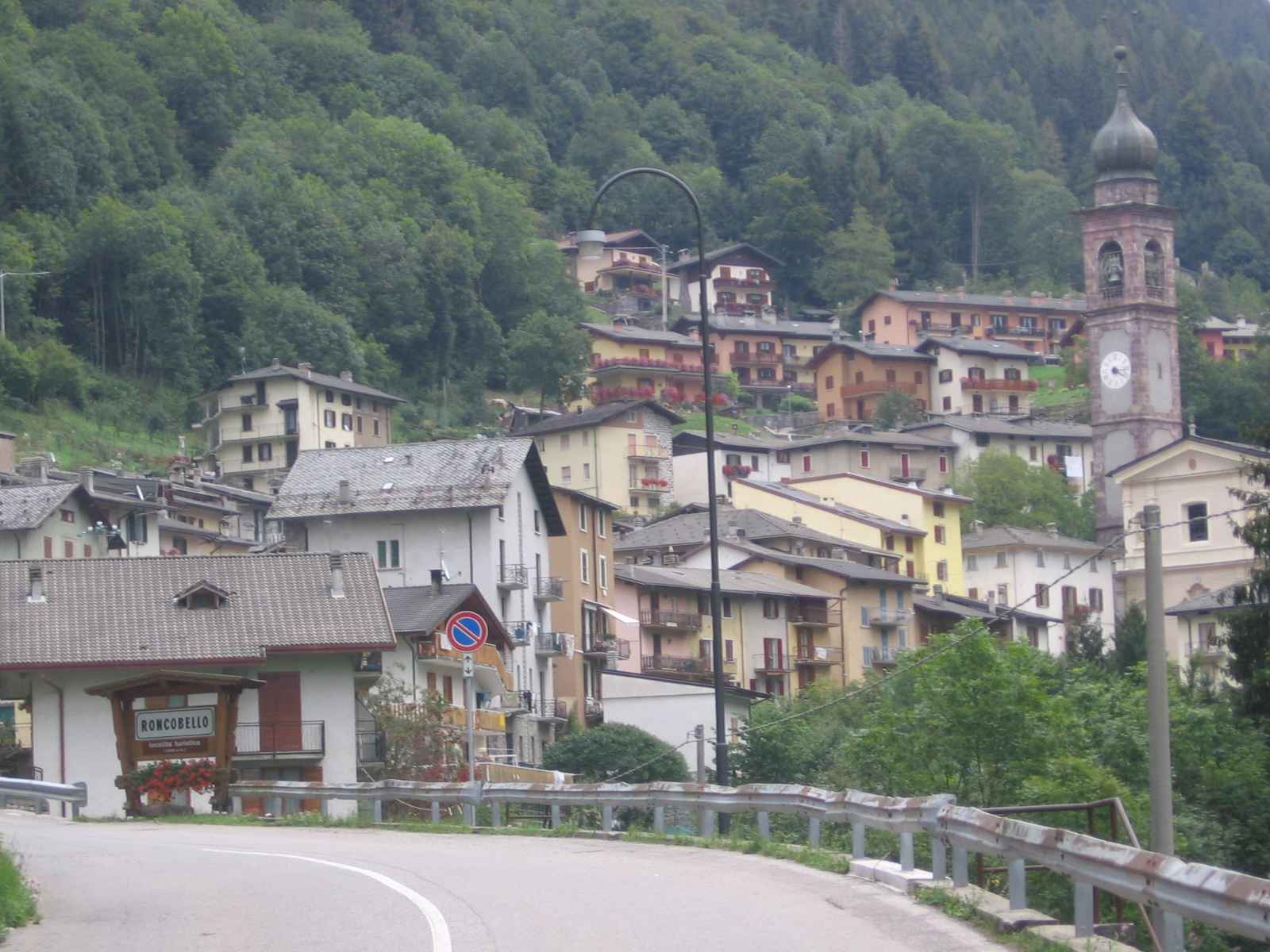
- Roncobello

- Coat of arms

- Location within Italy Location within Lombardy
- Coordinates: 45°57′N 9°45′E
- Country: Italy
- Region: Lombardy
- Province: Bergamo (BG)
- Frazioni: Baresi, Bordogna, Capovalle

Government
  - Mayor: Andrea Milesi

Area
  - Total: 25.5 km^{2} (9.8 sq mi)
- Elevation: 1,007 m (3,304 ft)

Population (31 December 2010)
  - Total: 436
  - Density: 17.1/km^{2} (44.3/sq mi)
- Demonym: Roncobellesi
- Time zone: UTC+1 (CET)
  - Summer (DST): UTC+2 (CEST)
- Postal code: 24010
- Dialing code: 0345

Roncobello (Bergamasque: Roncobèl) is a comune (municipality) in the Province of Bergamo in the Italian region of Lombardy, located about 70 kilometres (43 mi) northeast of Milan and about 30 kilometres (19 mi) north of Bergamo.

Roncobello borders the following municipalities: Ardesio, Branzi, Dossena, Isola di Fondra, Lenna, Moio de' Calvi, Oltre il Colle, Serina.

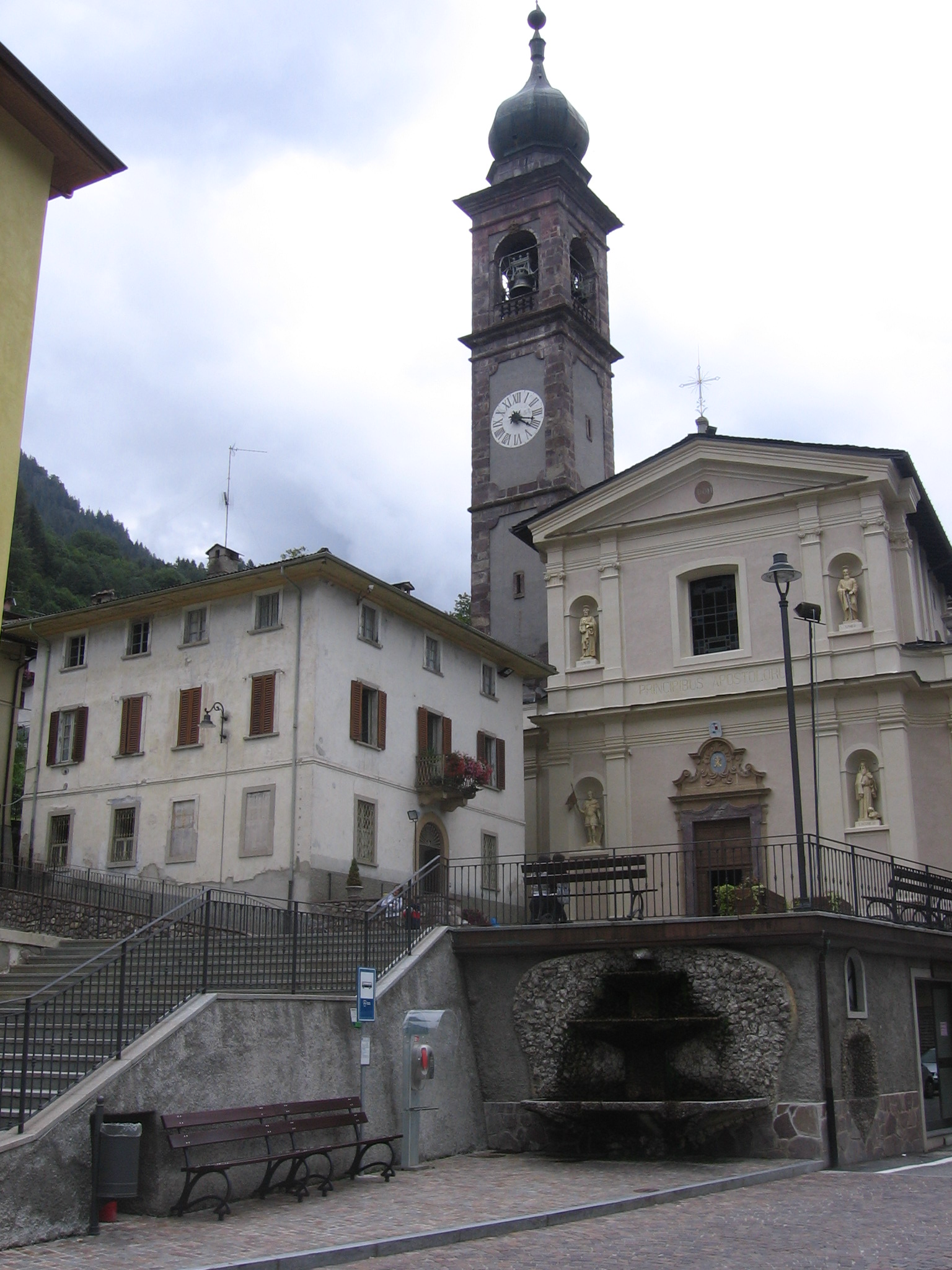
Parish church

A view of the Baresi mill
