= Omodeo Tasso =

Italian patriarch of the Thurn und Taxis dynasty

Omodeo Tasso or Omodeo de Tassis (13th century – 1290) was an Italian patriarch of the Thurn und Taxis dynasty in the late 13th century. He is generally credited with initiating the first modern postal service as the administrators first of the Imperial Post and later their own postal network.

Omodeo's family was known to have lived in the Val Brembana in Cornello dei Tasso since c. 1200. The feuding between the Guelph Colleoni and the Ghibelline Suardi in the nearby commune of Bergamo caused them to relocate to the more distant village of Cornello, where Omodeo grew up. Around 1290, after Milan had conquered Bergamo, Omodeo organized 32 of his relatives into the Company of Couriers (Italian: Compagnia dei Corrieri) and linked Milan with Venice and Rome. The recipient of royal and papal patronage, his company was so comparatively efficient that post riders became known as bergamaschi throughout Italy.

== Legacy ==
Under the misspelling "Omedio Tassis", Omodeo figures prominently in the Thomas Pynchon novella The Crying of Lot 49.

== See also ==
- Postal history of Germany
- Princely House of Thurn and Taxis
