= Monte Cancervo =

Mountain in Lombardy, Italy

- Monte Cancervo seen from Monte Venturosa

Highest point
- Elevation: 1,835 m (6,020 ft)
- Prominence: 134 m (440 ft)
- Coordinates: 45°54′52″N 9°37′04″E

Geography
- Location: Lombardy, Italy
- Parent range: Bergamasque Prealps

Monte Cancervo is a mountain of Lombardy, Italy, with an elevation of 1,835 metres (6,020 ft). It is located in the Bergamasque Prealps, in the Province of Bergamo, between the Val Taleggio and the Val Brembana.

Lying west of Camerata Cornello and San Giovanni Bianco, Monte Cancervo is just south of Monte Venturosa, from which it is separated by Passo di Grialeggio. Its peak can be reached on several hiking paths of varying difficulty from San Giovanni Bianco.

The mountain lies entirely within the Bergamasque Alps Regional Park.
