= Lenna, Lombardy =

Lenna
- Comune
- Comune di Lenna
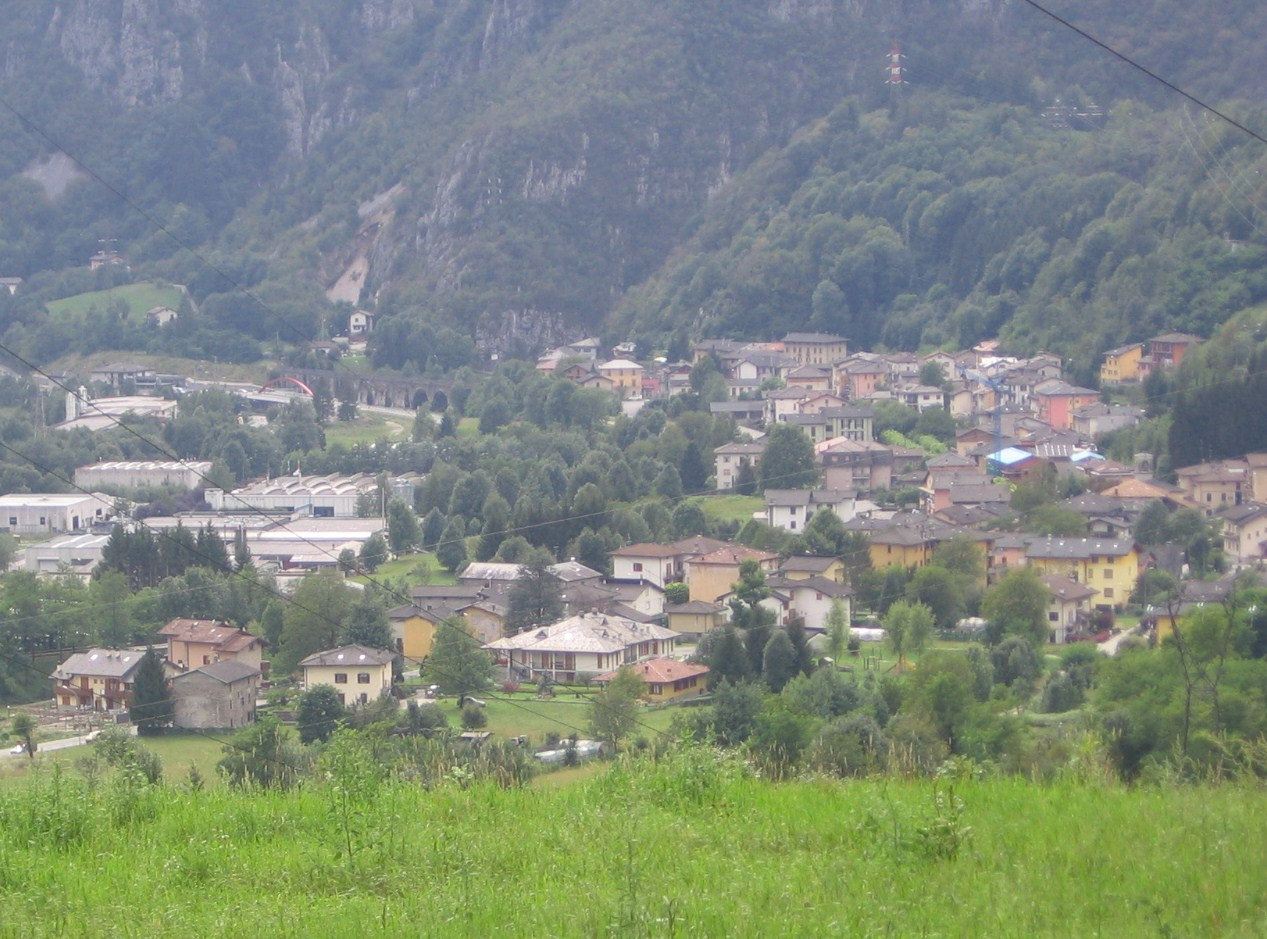
- Lenna

- Coat of arms

- Location within Italy Location within Lombardy
- Coordinates: 45°56′36″N 9°40′39″E
- Country: Italy
- Region: Lombardy
- Province: Province of Bergamo (BG)
- Frazioni: Scalvino, Cornamena, Coltura, L'Oro, Cantone Santa Maria, Cantone San Francesco

Area
  - Total: 12.88 km^{2} (4.97 sq mi)
- Elevation: 465 m (1,526 ft)

Population (Dec. 2004)
  - Total: 676
  - Density: 52.5/km^{2} (136/sq mi)
- Demonym: Lennesi
- Time zone: UTC+1 (CET)
  - Summer (DST): UTC+2 (CEST)
- Postal code: 24010
- Dialing code: 0345

Lenna (Bergamasque: Lèna) is a comune (municipality) in the Province of Bergamo in the Italian region of Lombardy, located about 70 kilometres (43 mi) northeast of Milan and about 30 kilometres (19 mi) north of Bergamo. As of 31 December 2004, it had a population of 676 and an area of 12.9 square kilometres (5.0 mi^{2}).

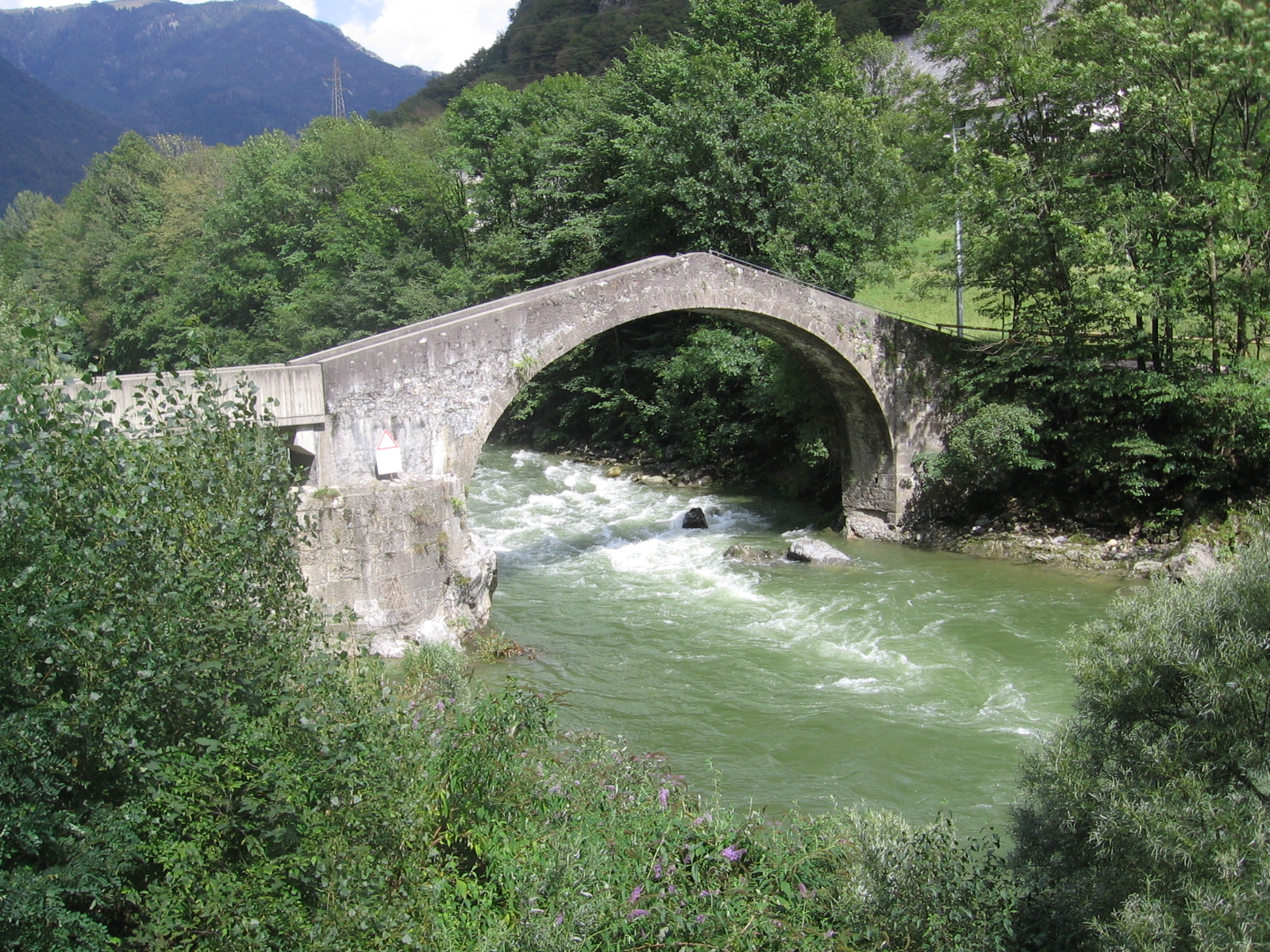
the goat bridge

The municipality of Lenna contains the frazione (subdivision) Scalvino.

Lenna borders the following municipalities: Camerata Cornello, Dossena, Moio de' Calvi, Piazza Brembana, Roncobello, San Giovanni Bianco, Valnegra.

== Demographic evolution ==
Historical population

Year	Pop.	±%
1861	1,100	—
1871	1,116	+1.5%
1881	1,122	+0.5%
1901	1,228	+9.4%
1911	1,174	−4.4%

Year	Pop.	±%
1921	1,201	+2.3%
1931	1,123	−6.5%
1936	893	−20.5%
1951	962	+7.7%
1961	871	−9.5%

Year	Pop.	±%
1971	795	−8.7%
1981	715	−10.1%
1991	696	−2.7%
2001	704	+1.1%

Source: Data from ISTAT
