= Cortenuova =

- Comune
- Comune di Cortenuova

- Coat of arms

- Location within Italy Location within Lombardy
- Coordinates: 45°32′N 9°47′E
- Country: Italy
- Region: Lombardy
- Province: Province of Bergamo (BG)

Government
  - Mayor: Gianmario Gatta

Area
  - Total: 7 km^{2} (2.7 sq mi)
- Elevation: 133 m (436 ft)

Population (2018-01-01)
  - Total: 1,867
  - Density: 270/km^{2} (690/sq mi)
- Demonym: Cortenovesi
- Time zone: UTC+1 (CET)
  - Summer (DST): UTC+2 (CEST)
- Postal code: 24058
- Dialing code: 0363
- Patron saint: Saint Lucy
- Saint day: 13 December
- Website: Official website

Cortenuova (also Cortenova; Bergamasque: Cor-nöa) is a town and comune in the province of Bergamo, Lombardy (northern Italy).

The battle of Cortenuova was fought here in 1237.
