= Mezzoldo =

Mezzoldo Mezóld
- Comune
- Comune di Mezzoldo
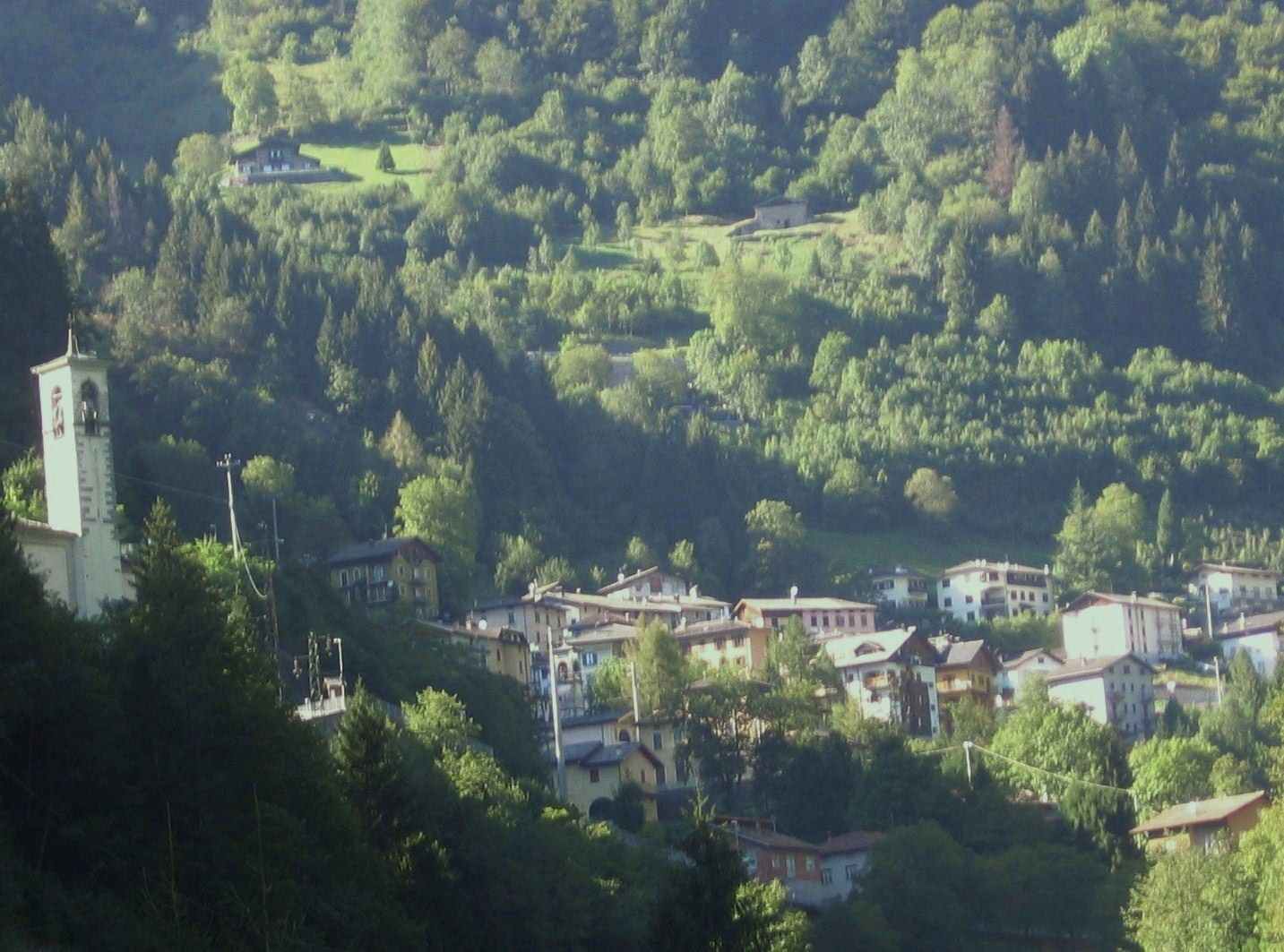
- Mezzoldo

- Coat of arms

- Location of Mezzoldo in Italy Mezzoldo (Lombardy)
- Coordinates: 46°1′N 9°40′E
- Country: Italy
- Region: Lombardy
- Province: Province of Bergamo (BG)
- Frazioni: Ca' San Marco, Ponte delle Acque, Sparavera, Soliva, Scaluggio, Cà Vassalli, Cà Bonetti.

Government
  - Mayor: Raimondo Balicco

Area
  - Total: 18.8 km^{2} (7.3 sq mi)
- Elevation: 835 m (2,740 ft)

Population (30 November 2019)
  - Total: 162
  - Density: 8.62/km^{2} (22.3/sq mi)
- Demonym: Mezzoldesi
- Time zone: UTC+1 (CET)
  - Summer (DST): UTC+2 (CEST)
- Postal code: 24010
- Dialing code: 0345
- ISTAT code: 016134
- Patron saint: San Giovanni Battista
- Saint day: 24 June
- Website: http://www.comune.mezzoldo.bg.it/

Mezzoldo (Bergamasque: Mezóld) is a comune (municipality) in the Province of Bergamo in the Italian region of Lombardy, located about 70 kilometres (43 mi) northeast of Milan and about 35 kilometres (22 mi) north of Bergamo. As of 31 December 2004, it had a population of 225 and an area of 18.8 square kilometres (7.3 mi^{2}).

The municipality of Mezzoldo contains the frazioni (subdivisions, mainly villages and hamlets) Ca' San Marco and Ponte delle Acque. Mezzoldo is also the last village on the south side of San Marco Pass.

Mezzoldo borders the following municipalities: Albaredo per San Marco, Averara, Olmo al Brembo, Piazzatorre, Piazzolo, Tartano and Valleve.

== Demographic evolution ==
Historical population

Year	Pop.	±%
1861	619	—
1871	372	−39.9%
1881	385	+3.5%
1901	403	+4.7%
1911	451	+11.9%

Year	Pop.	±%
1921	517	+14.6%
1931	506	−2.1%
1936	408	−19.4%
1951	516	+26.5%
1961	488	−5.4%

Year	Pop.	±%
1971	460	−5.7%
1981	337	−26.7%
1991	281	−16.6%
2001	222	−21.0%

Source: Data from ISTAT
