= Treviolo =

- Comune
- Comune di Treviolo
- Saint George's church

- Location within Italy Location within Lombardy
- Coordinates: 45°40′22″N 9°35′56″E
- Country: Italy
- Region: Lombardy
- Province: Province of Bergamo (BG)
- Frazioni: Curnasco, Albegno, Roncola

Area
  - Total: 8.7 km^{2} (3.4 sq mi)
- Elevation: 225 m (738 ft)

Population (January 2011)
  - Total: 10,363
  - Density: 1,200/km^{2} (3,100/sq mi)
- Demonym: Treviolesi
- Time zone: UTC+1 (CET)
  - Summer (DST): UTC+2 (CEST)
- Postal code: 24048
- Dialing code: 035
- Website: Official website

Treviolo (Bergamasque: Treviöl) is a comune (municipality) in the Province of Bergamo in the Italian region of Lombardy, located about 40 kilometres (25 mi) northeast of Milan and about 7 kilometres (4 mi) southwest of Bergamo. As of 1 January 2011, it had a population of 10,363 and an area of 8.7 square kilometres (3.4 mi^{2}).

The municipality of Treviolo contains the frazioni (subdivisions, mainly villages and hamlets) Curnasco, Albegno, and Roncola: Curnasco is the most populated.

Treviolo borders the following municipalities: Bergamo, Bonate Sopra, Bonate Sotto, Curno, Dalmine, Lallio.

== History ==
The first human settlements in the area were probably the Ligurian tribes, as evidenced by the name "Curnasco", where the suffix "-asco" is a characteristic feature of those populations.

In the Roman period, the residential nucleus developed considerably; given the proximity to Bergamo, it is assumed that those settlements were military outposts for the city.

At the end of Roman domination, it is thought that Treviolo, Albegno and Curnasco went through a phase of depopulation, which ended with the arrival of the Lombards, who established Curnasco, cited in documents of the year 774. Of the 871 are the acts which refer to Albineas (later translated as early as 964 in Albigna), while Trevilio appears in papers dating back to 910 (only in 1174 would it appear as Triviliolo).

During this time, the entire area was ruled by the Holy Roman Empire, whose rulers instituted feudalism. Those entrusted to the Bishop of Bergamo territories of Treviolo already in the 12th century, but their proximity to the capital made them particularly vulnerable areas for the Guelph and Ghibelline factions, which sought to take control.

The fighting reached its climax in 1405, when Treviolo was subjected to a violent attack perpetrated by the Colleoni, a Guelph family of Trezzo, which destroyed buildings and killed many inhabitants sided with the enemy faction. The situation returned to normal only at the beginning of the 15th century, when the Republic of Venice, thanks to a series of targeted interventions, managed to restore a balance by putting an end to the social struggles and lifting the economy, promoting agricultural development. This development occurred despite the land not being particularly fertile (because of the alluvial and gravel nature; it was remedied by creating a series of small irrigation canals. Following this, even the fraction of Roncola was developed.

In 1927, the comune took its present size, when Treviolo joined other fractions. However, Curnasco tried to regain self-government many times in the second half of the 20th century, though without success.

== Sport events ==
On 6 January, every year, in the fraction of Roncola at parco Callioni, is held the "Maratona sul Brembo", regular race of FIDAL.

== Demographic evolution ==
Historical population

Year	Pop.	±%
1861	1,855	—
1871	1,905	+2.7%
1881	2,031	+6.6%
1901	2,295	+13.0%
1911	2,715	+18.3%

Year	Pop.	±%
1921	2,942	+8.4%
1931	3,551	+20.7%
1936	3,743	+5.4%
1951	4,570	+22.1%
1961	4,618	+1.1%

Year	Pop.	±%
1971	5,872	+27.2%
1981	6,697	+14.0%
1991	7,752	+15.8%
2001	8,618	+11.2%

Source: Data from ISTAT

== Twin towns ==
Treviolo is twinned with:

- Gmina Łęczna, Poland
- Borgo a Mozzano, Italy
