= Valnegra =

- Comune
- Comune di Valnegra
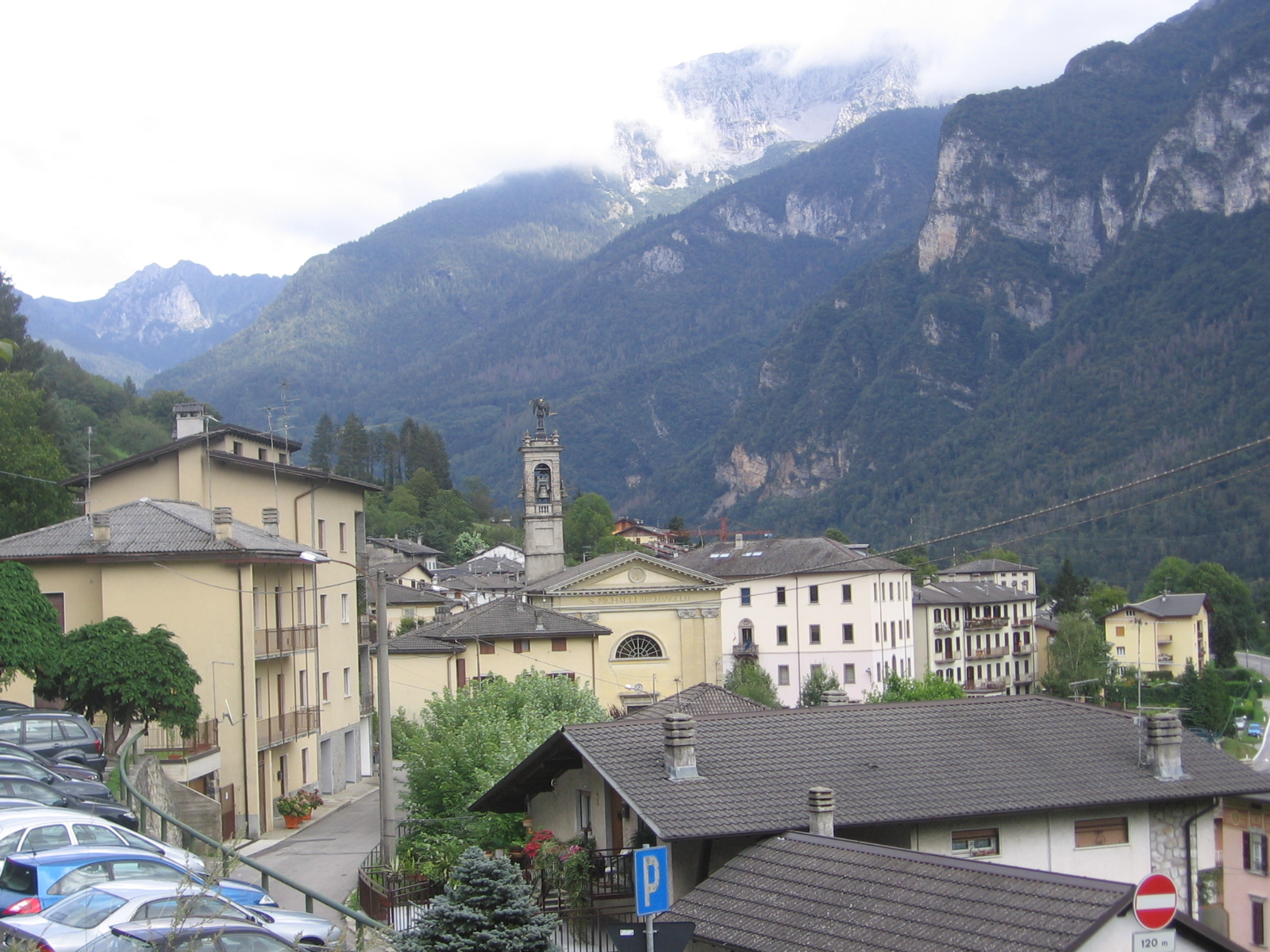
- Valnegra

- Coat of arms

- Location within Italy Location within Lombardy
- Coordinates: 45°57′N 9°41′E
- Country: Italy
- Region: Lombardy
- Province: Province of Bergamo (BG)

Area
  - Total: 2.1 km^{2} (0.81 sq mi)
- Elevation: 581 m (1,906 ft)

Population (Dec. 2004)
  - Total: 233
  - Density: 110/km^{2} (290/sq mi)
- Demonym: Valnegresi
- Time zone: UTC+1 (CET)
  - Summer (DST): UTC+2 (CEST)
- Postal code: 24010
- Dialing code: 0345

Valnegra (Bergamasque: Alnìgra) is a comune (municipality) in the Province of Bergamo in the Italian region of Lombardy, located about 70 kilometres (43 mi) northeast of Milan and about 30 kilometres (19 mi) north of Bergamo. As of 31 December 2004, it had a population of 233 and an area of 2.1 square kilometres (0.81 mi^{2}).

Valnegra borders the following municipalities: Lenna, Moio de' Calvi, Piazza Brembana, Piazzolo.

== Demographic evolution ==
Historical population

Year	Pop.	±%
1861	285	—
1871	314	+10.2%
1881	338	+7.6%
1901	371	+9.8%
1911	377	+1.6%

Year	Pop.	±%
1921	353	−6.4%
1931	331	−6.2%
1936	237	−28.4%
1951	352	+48.5%
1961	312	−11.4%

Year	Pop.	±%
1971	290	−7.1%
1981	253	−12.8%
1991	238	−5.9%
2001	230	−3.4%

Source: Data from ISTAT
