= Piazza Brembana =

- Comune
- Comune di Piazza Brembana
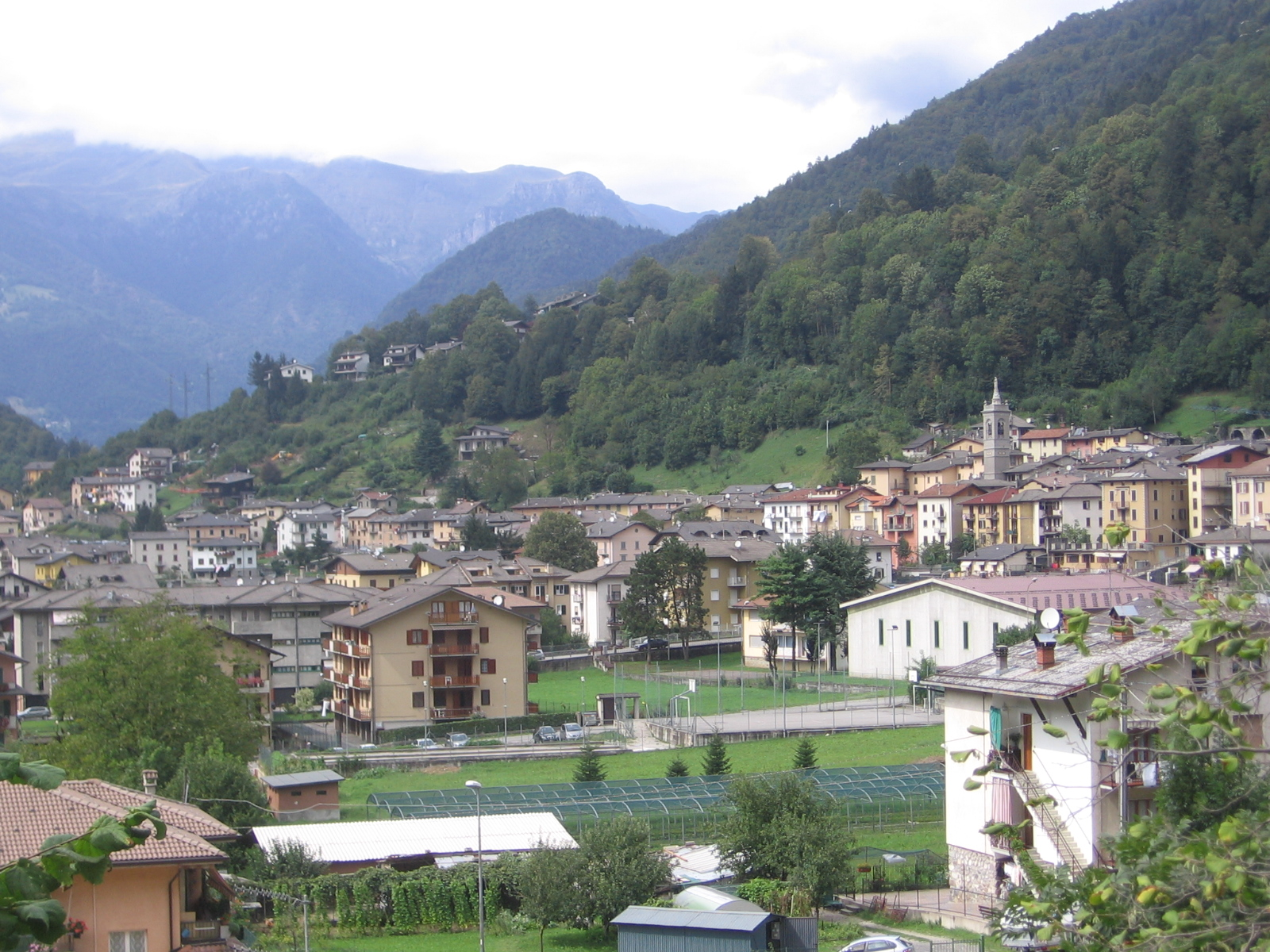
- Piazza Brembana

- Coat of arms

- Location within Italy Location within Lombardy
- Coordinates: 45°56′50″N 9°40′30″E
- Country: Italy
- Region: Lombardy
- Province: Bergamo (BG)

Government
  - Mayor: Geremia Arizzi

Area
  - Total: 6.77 km^{2} (2.61 sq mi)
- Elevation: 518 m (1,699 ft)

Population (31 March 2018)
  - Total: 1,227
  - Density: 181/km^{2} (469/sq mi)
- Demonym: Piazzesi
- Time zone: UTC+1 (CET)
  - Summer (DST): UTC+2 (CEST)
- Postal code: 24014
- Dialing code: 0345
- Patron saint: St. Martin
- Website: Official website

Piazza Brembana (Bergamasque: Piassa) is a comune (municipality) in the Province of Bergamo in the Italian region of Lombardy, located about 70 kilometres (43 mi) northeast of Milan and about 30 kilometres (19 mi) north of Bergamo.

Piazza Brembana borders the following municipalities: Camerata Cornello, Cassiglio, Lenna, Olmo al Brembo, Piazzolo, Valnegra.

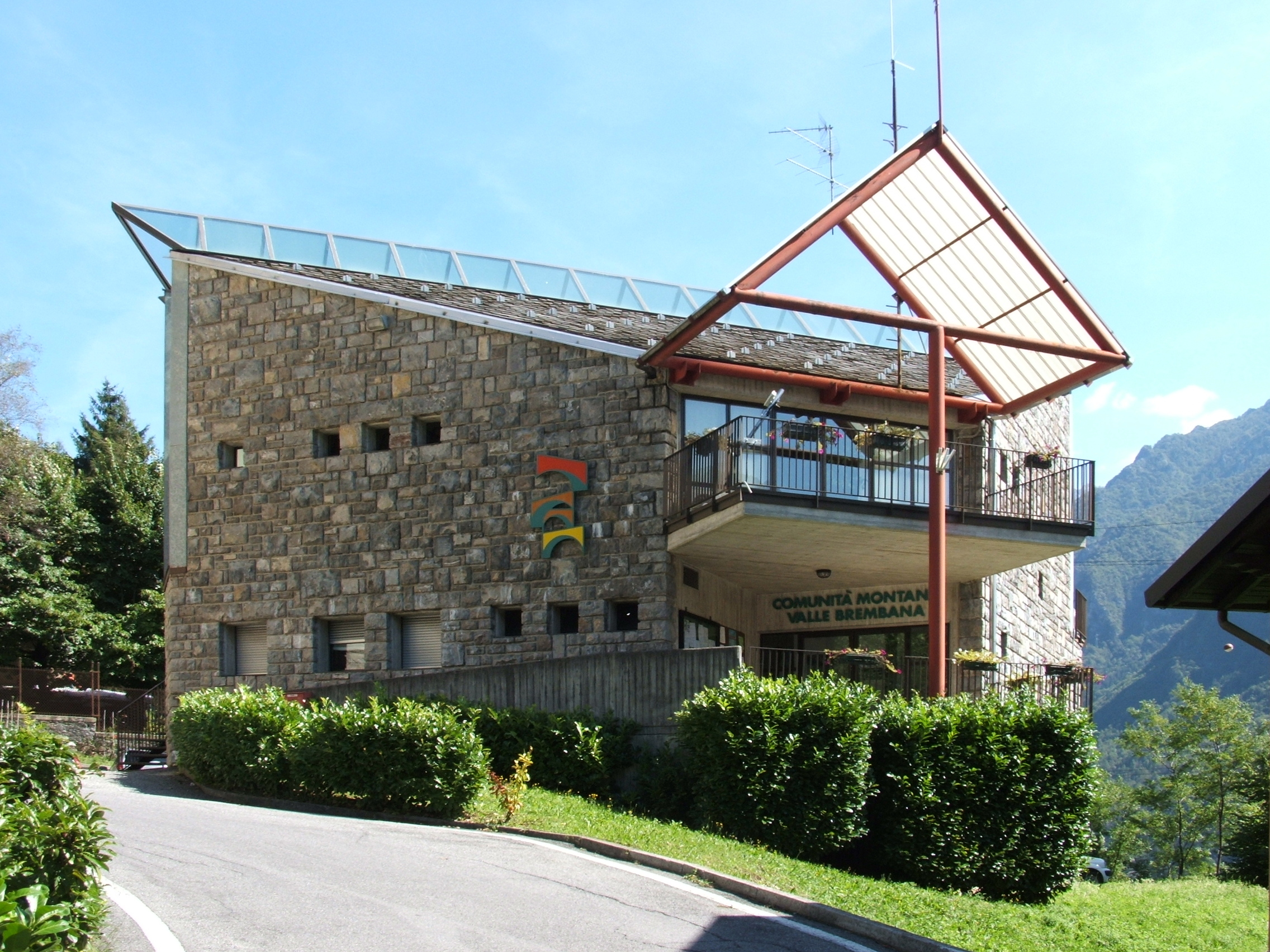
The headquarters of the mountain community of Brembana valley

== People ==
- Alessandro Carmelo Ruffinoni, (1943) bishop of Caxias do Sul
