= Tartano =

Tartano Tàrten (Lombard)
- Comune
- Comune di Tartano
- Location within Italy Location within Lombardy
- Coordinates: 46°7′N 9°41′E
- Country: Italy
- Region: Lombardy
- Province: Province of Sondrio (SO)

Area
  - Total: 47.6 km^{2} (18.4 sq mi)

Population (Dec. 2004)
  - Total: 236
  - Density: 4.96/km^{2} (12.8/sq mi)
- Time zone: UTC+1 (CET)
  - Summer (DST): UTC+2 (CEST)
- Postal code: 23010
- Dialing code: 0342

Tartano (Lombard: Tàrten) is a comune (municipality) in the Province of Sondrio in the Italian region of Lombardy, located about 80 kilometres (50 mi) northeast of Milan and about 15 kilometres (9 mi) southwest of Sondrio. As of 31 December 2004, it had a population of 236 and an area of 47.6 square kilometres (18.4 mi^{2}).

Tartano borders the following municipalities: Albaredo per San Marco, Foppolo, Forcola, Fusine, Mezzoldo, Talamona, Valleve.

== Demographic evolution ==
Historical population

Year	Pop.	±%
1861	1,277	—
1871	1,374	+7.6%
1881	1,367	−0.5%
1901	1,410	+3.1%
1911	1,482	+5.1%

Year	Pop.	±%
1921	1,400	−5.5%
1931	1,196	−14.6%
1936	1,189	−0.6%
1951	1,211	+1.9%
1961	1,162	−4.0%

Year	Pop.	±%
1971	707	−39.2%
1981	489	−30.8%
1991	328	−32.9%
2001	262	−20.1%

Source: Data from ISTAT
