= Isola di Fondra =

- Comune
- Comune di Isola di Fondra
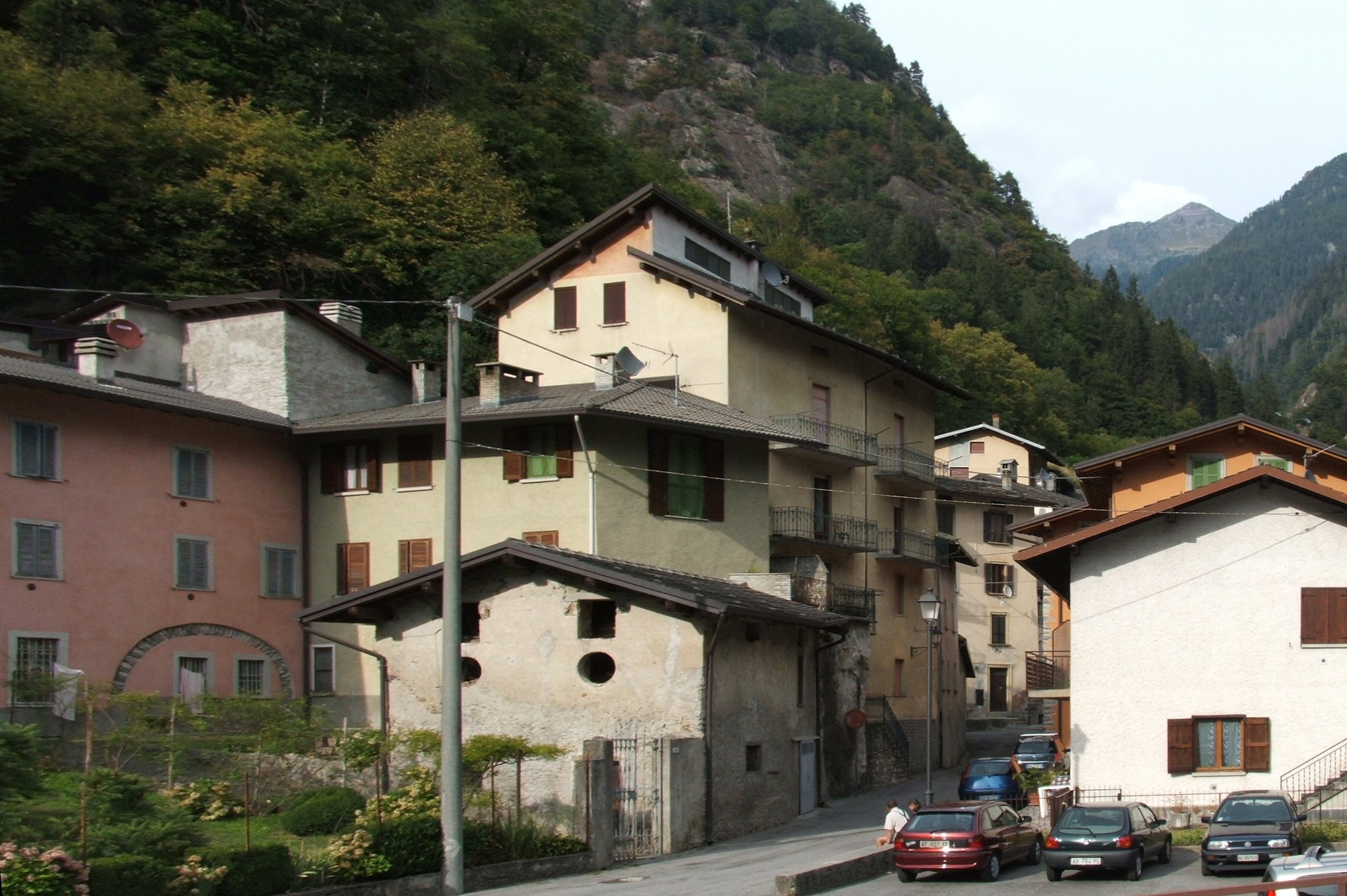
- Isola di Fondra

- Coat of arms

- Location within Italy Location within Lombardy
- Coordinates: 45°59′N 9°45′E
- Country: Italy
- Region: Lombardy
- Province: Bergamo (BG)
- Frazioni: Fondra, Trabuchello

Government
  - Mayor: Giovanni Berera

Area
  - Total: 13.2 km^{2} (5.1 sq mi)
- Elevation: 799 m (2,621 ft)

Population (31 December 2010)
  - Total: 189
  - Density: 14.3/km^{2} (37.1/sq mi)
- Demonym: Trabuchellesi
- Time zone: UTC+1 (CET)
  - Summer (DST): UTC+2 (CEST)
- Postal code: 24010
- Dialing code: 0345

Isola di Fondra (Bergamasque: Fundra) is a comune (municipality) in the Province of Bergamo in the Italian region of Lombardy, located about 70 kilometres (43 mi) northeast of Milan and about 30 kilometres (19 mi) north of Bergamo. It is formed by three hamlets, Fondra, Pusdosso and Trabuchello.

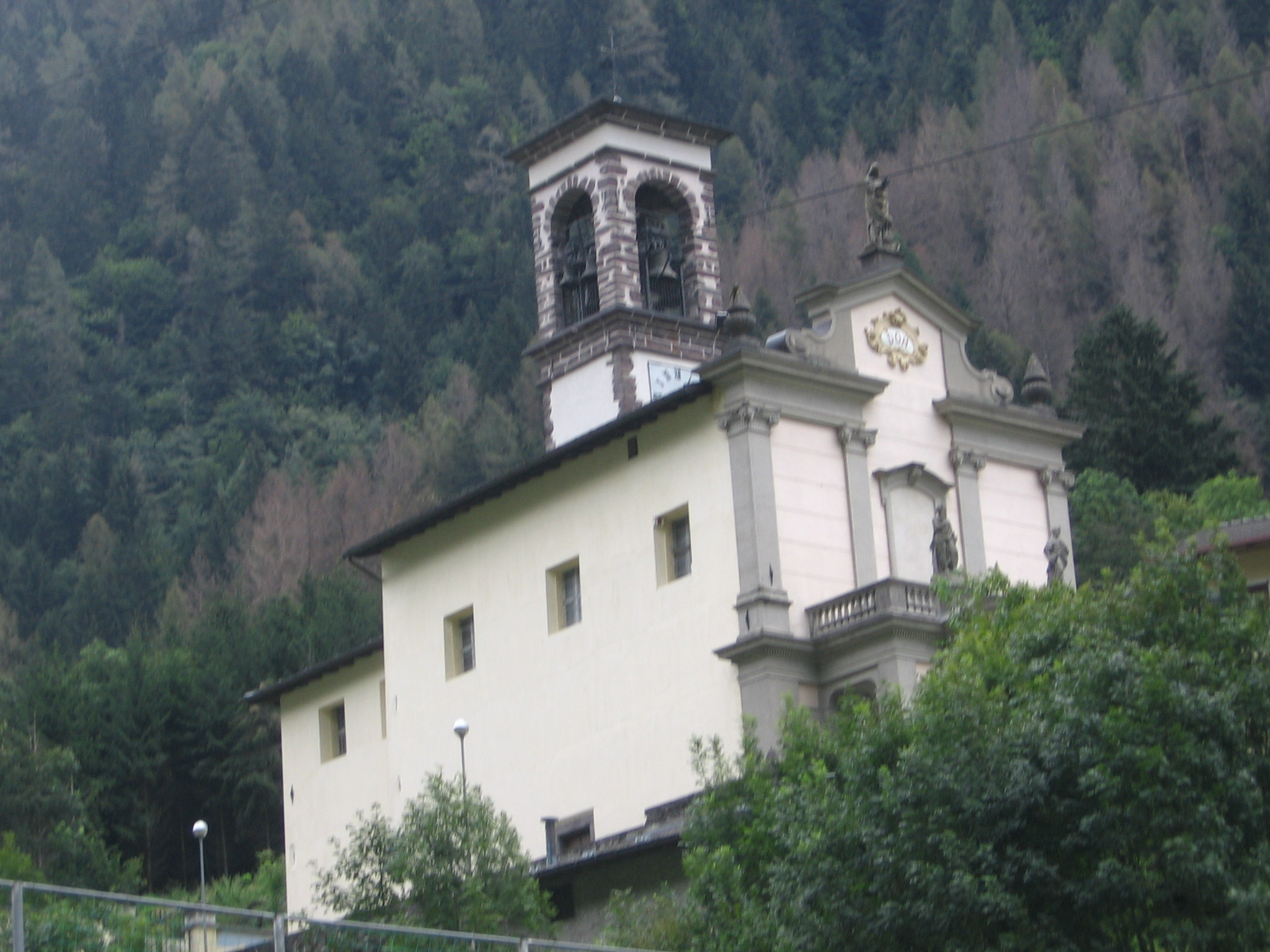
Trabuchello church

Isola di Fondra borders the following municipalities: Branzi, Moio de' Calvi, Piazzatorre, Roncobello.
