= Olmo al Brembo =

- Comune
- Comune di Olmo al Brembo
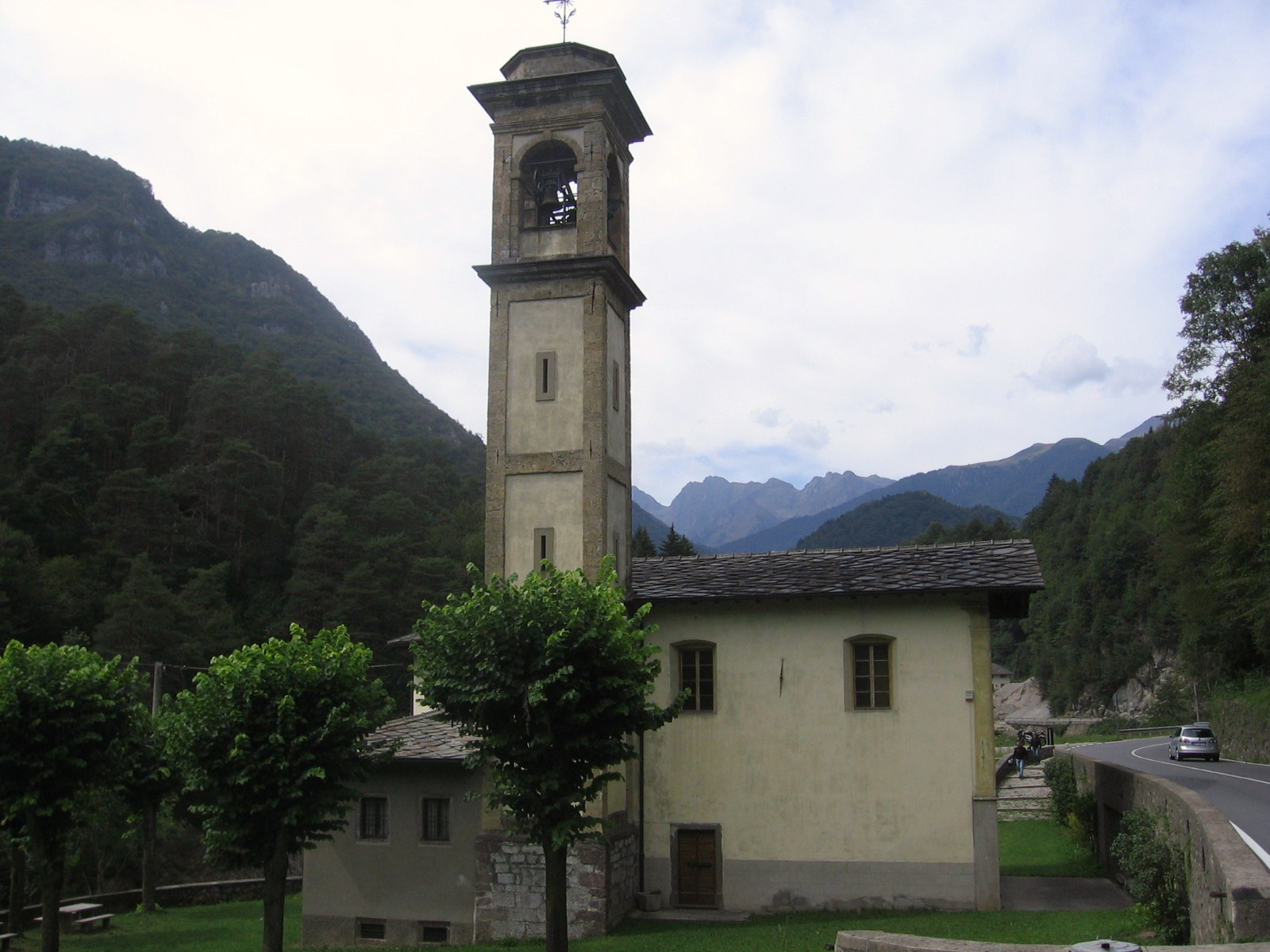
- Sanctuary of Madonna dei Campelli.

- Coat of arms

- Location within Italy Location within Lombardy
- Coordinates: 45°58′N 9°38′E
- Country: Italy
- Region: Lombardy
- Province: Bergamo (BG)

Government
  - Mayor: Sergio Amboni

Area
  - Total: 7.9 km^{2} (3.1 sq mi)
- Elevation: 556 m (1,824 ft)

Population (31 December 2017)
  - Total: 556
  - Density: 70/km^{2} (180/sq mi)
- Demonym: Olmesi
- Time zone: UTC+1 (CET)
  - Summer (DST): UTC+2 (CEST)
- Postal code: 24010
- Dialing code: 0345
- Patron saint: St. Anthony Abbot
- Saint day: 17 January
- Website: Official website

Olmo al Brembo (Bergamasque: L'Ulem) is a comune (municipality) in the Province of Bergamo in the Italian region of Lombardy, located about 70 kilometres (43 mi) northeast of Milan and about 45 kilometres (28 mi) north of Bergamo.

Olmo al Brembo borders the following municipalities: Averara, Cassiglio, Mezzoldo, Piazza Brembana, Piazzatorre, Piazzolo, Santa Brigida. Olmo al Brembo is an ancient village built along Strada Priula. About 15 kilometres (9 mi) from there is San Marco Pass, which links Valle Brembana and Valtellina
