= Santini Cycling =

Italian cycling clothes brand

- Product type: Cycling clothing
- Current owner: Santini spa
- Country: Italy
- Introduced: 1965
- Markets: Worldwide
- Website: www.santinicycling.com

Santini Cycling is a cycling clothes brand of the Italian clothing production company Santini Maglificio Sportivo. Established in 1965 in Bergamo, Santini developed from Pietro Santini's enthusiasm for cycling. Items are made in Italy.

== History ==
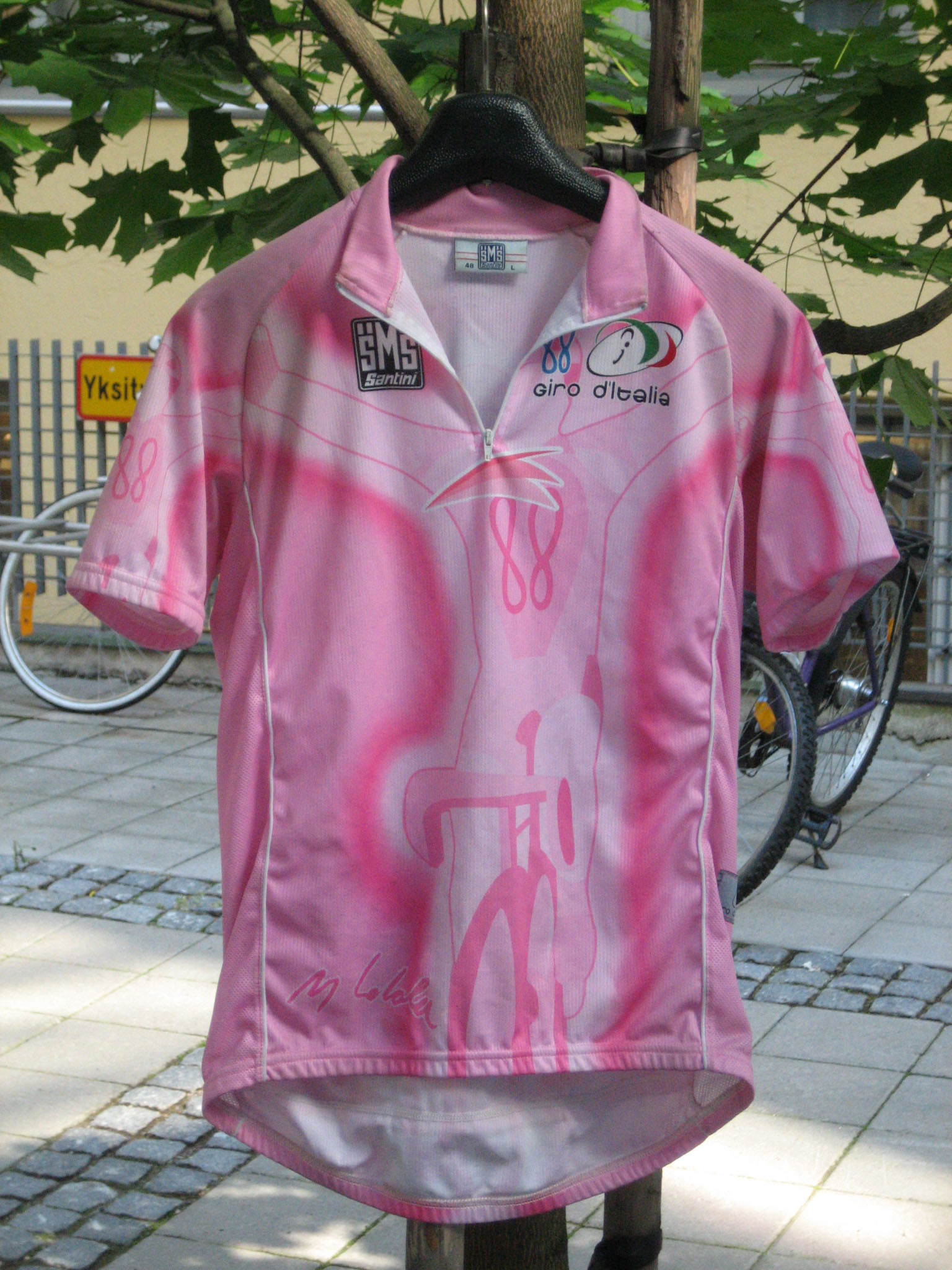
Pink jersey for the leader in the Giro d'Italia

Santini began in 1965 when Pietro Santini founded the company under the name Santini Maglificio Sportivo.

After the initial years, where production was dedicated to general wool garments, the company moved towards sportswear, and cycling apparel, in particular.

=== The 1970s ===
The company began to experiment materials like Lycra for cycling shorts, gradually replacing the traditional wool with synthetics. Santini introduced synthetic, anti-bacterial paddings, gradually replacing the traditional chamois.

1977 is the year of the first international cycling team sponsored by Santini, named Peugeot/Esso-Michelin. The beginning of sponsorships Peugeot/Esso-Michelin was the first real international team sponsorship for Santini.

Santini made use of Polyamide in the manufacture of jerseys. In 1979 Santini started producing coloured shorts: before that time this garment was traditionally black.

=== The 1980s ===
At the beginning of the 1980’s the sublimatic printing process was invented and Santini was one of the first producers to introduce it in the world of professional cycling. As cycling teams needed a way to include more sponsor logos on their apparel, the traditional embroidery process proved both time-consuming and impractical.

1984 saw the launch of the Team La Vie Claire jersey. The team La Vie Claire colours were based on the artwork of Piet Mondrian. Manufactured by Santini.

Santini became the official supplier of the UCI World Championship in 1988 and started producing the World Cup jerseys.

=== The 1990s ===
The ‘90s saw the introduction of new highly breathable and windproof membrane technologies. Santini was the first to introduce Gore Windstopper fabrics into cycle clothing.

1992 saw Italian cyclist Gianni Bugno win at the World Road Championships in Benidorm, Spain, wearing a Santini jersey.

1993 marked the first year in which Santini became the official technical sponsor of the Giro d’Italia and supplier of the Maglia Rosa, an association that lasted until 2017.

In 1998 Santini became the official supplier to the Mercatone-Uno team.

=== The 2000s ===
The collaboration with Australian cycling began in 2000.

In 2002 Santini became the technical clothing partner of the Mapei-Quickstep team.

=== The 2010s ===
2015 marked Santini’s fiftieth anniversary. Santini became the official clothing partner of Eroica. Santini designed a line of vintage replica wool cycling garments.

Santini introduced of anti-abrasion Impact shorts.

=== The 2020s ===
2019 saw Santini partner with the Ironman Group. Santini became the official supplier of all technical apparel to all Ironman events; plus, in collaboration developed a series of co-branded capsule collections.

In 2021, Santini Cycling established a partnership with the Tour de France and the Tour de France Femmes avec Zwift. As part of this collaboration, the jerseys worn by classification leaders in these races featured the Santini name. Santini sponsored other cycling events like Paris-Roubaix, Liège-Bastogne-Liège, Fleche Wallone, Paris Tour, and stage races such as Paris-Nice and Criterium du Dauphiné.

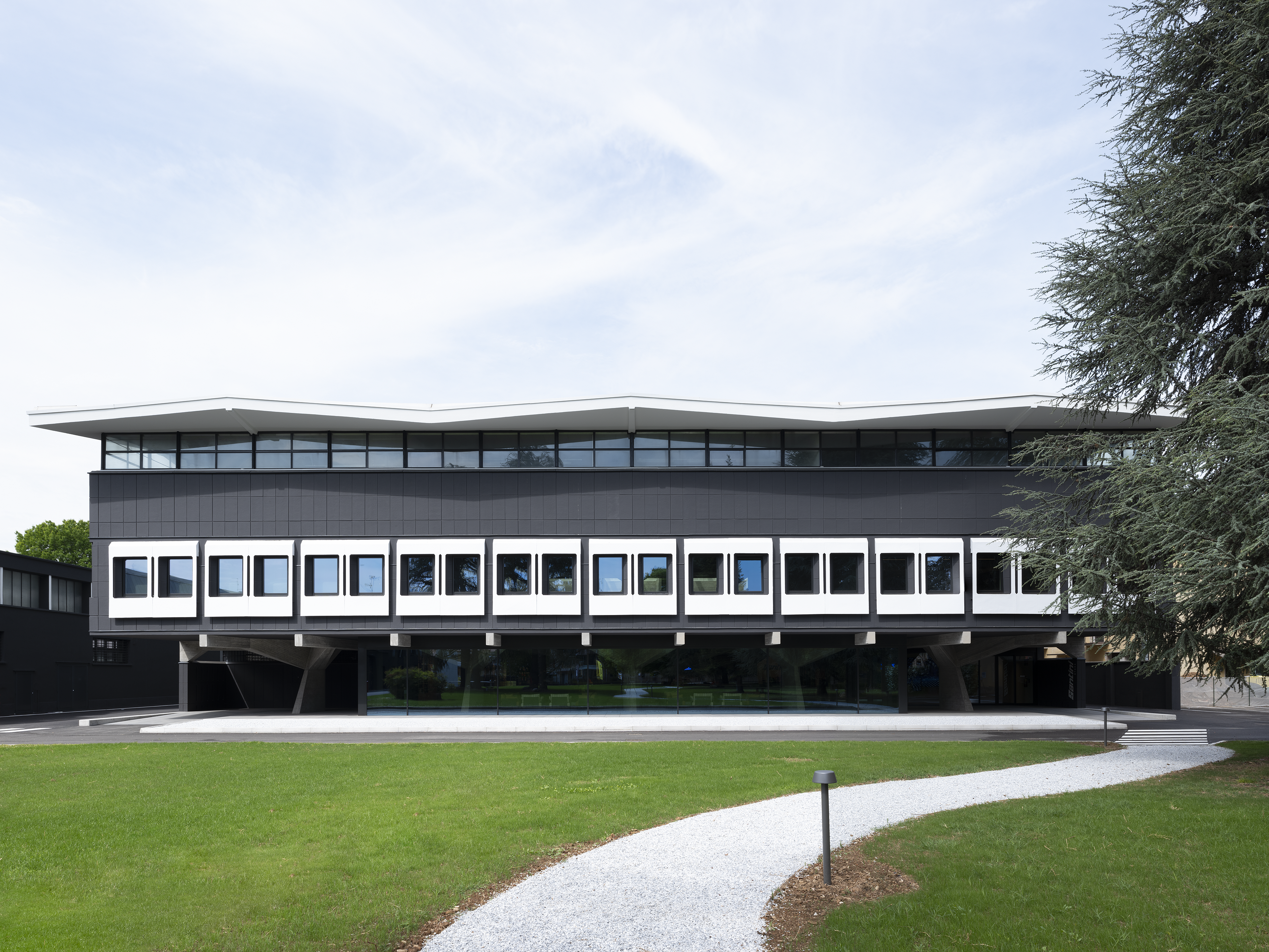
New Santini Headquarter in Bergamo, Italy. A 16000 m2 composed by 10000 m2 of green area and 6000m2 of factory and offices

In 2021, Santini invested in a new headquarters in the heart of the city of Bergamo. Santini renovated an old factory, creating a campus where the office building and the production facility are surrounded by over 10,000 square meters of park.

== Teams ==
Santini cycling is and was also the cycling clothes sponsor of a number of cycling teams including:

- LIDL-TREK
- Tour de Tietema
- Nippo–Vini Fantini
- Boels–Dolmans
- Belkin Pro Cycling Team
- La Vie Claire
- Mapei
- Mercatone Uno
- Acqua & Sapone
- Selle Italia
- Lampre–Fondital / Lampre-NGC
- Team Katusha
- Diquigiovanni–Androni Giocattoli
- Vacansoleil–DCM
- Slovak national team
- Australian national team
- Irish national team
- CatfordCC Equipe/Banks
- AMKO Sport (1982)

== See also ==
- Sportswear (activewear)
