= Camerata Cornello =

- Comune
- Comune di Camerata Cornello
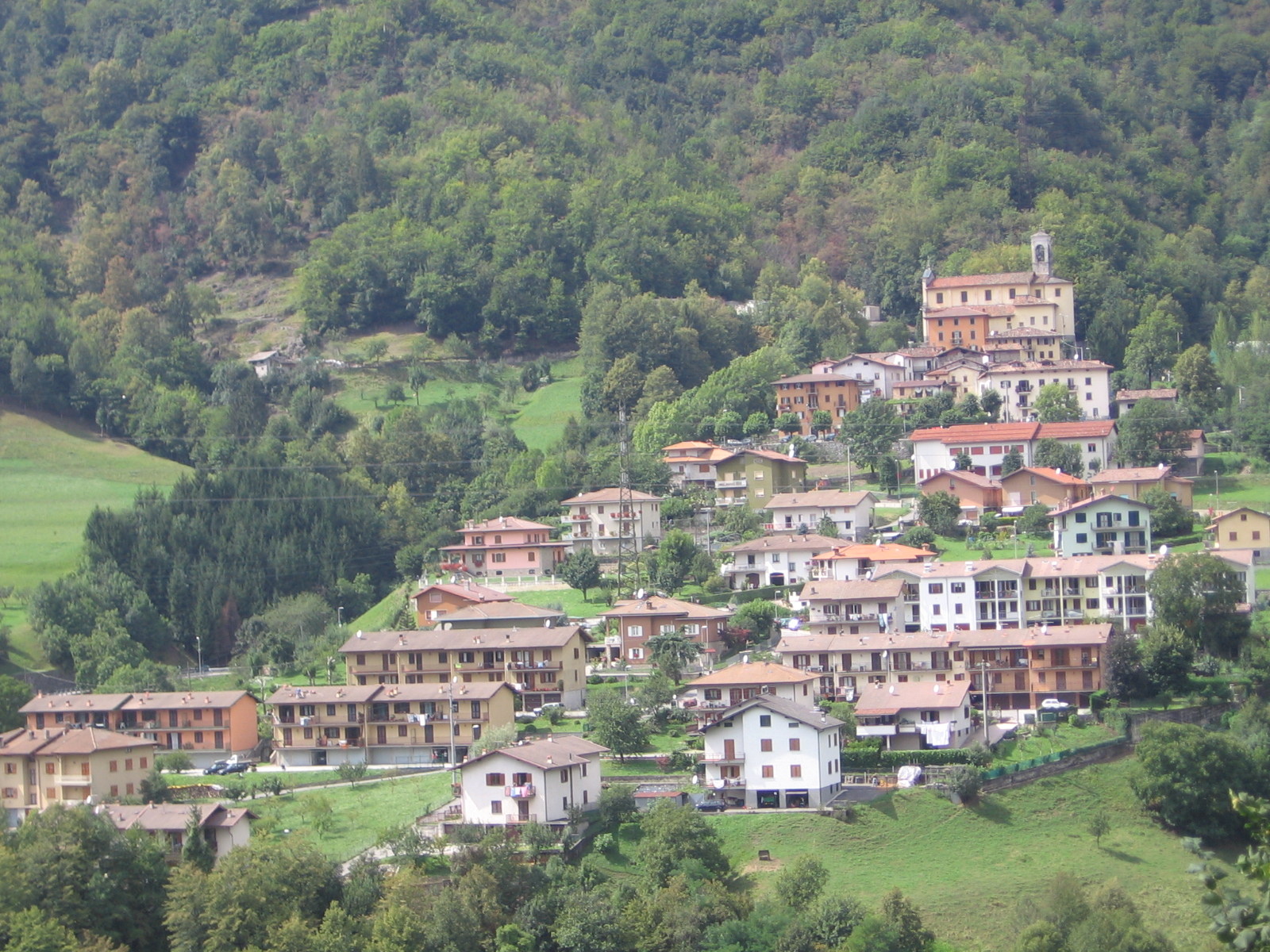
- Camerata Cornello

- Coat of arms

- Location within Italy Location within Lombardy
- Coordinates: 45°54′N 9°39′E
- Country: Italy
- Region: Lombardy
- Province: Bergamo (BG)
- Frazioni: Cornello, Cespedosio, Brembella, Bretto

Government
  - Mayor: Gianfranco Lazzarini

Area
  - Total: 12.6 km^{2} (4.9 sq mi)
- Elevation: 570 m (1,870 ft)

Population (30 April 2017)
  - Total: 621
  - Density: 49.3/km^{2} (128/sq mi)
- Demonym: Cameratesi
- Time zone: UTC+1 (CET)
  - Summer (DST): UTC+2 (CEST)
- Postal code: 24010
- Dialing code: 0345
- Patron saint: Assumption of Mary
- Saint day: August 15
- Website: Official website

Camerata Cornello (Bergamasque: Camerada) is a comune (municipality) in the Province of Bergamo in the Italian region of Lombardy, located about 60 km (37 mi) northeast of Milan and about 20 km (12 mi) north of Bergamo.

Camerata Cornello borders the following municipalities: Cassiglio, Lenna, Piazza Brembana, San Giovanni Bianco, Taleggio. Its frazione of Cornello dei Tasso is one of I Borghi più belli d'Italia ("The most beautiful villages of Italy").

== People ==
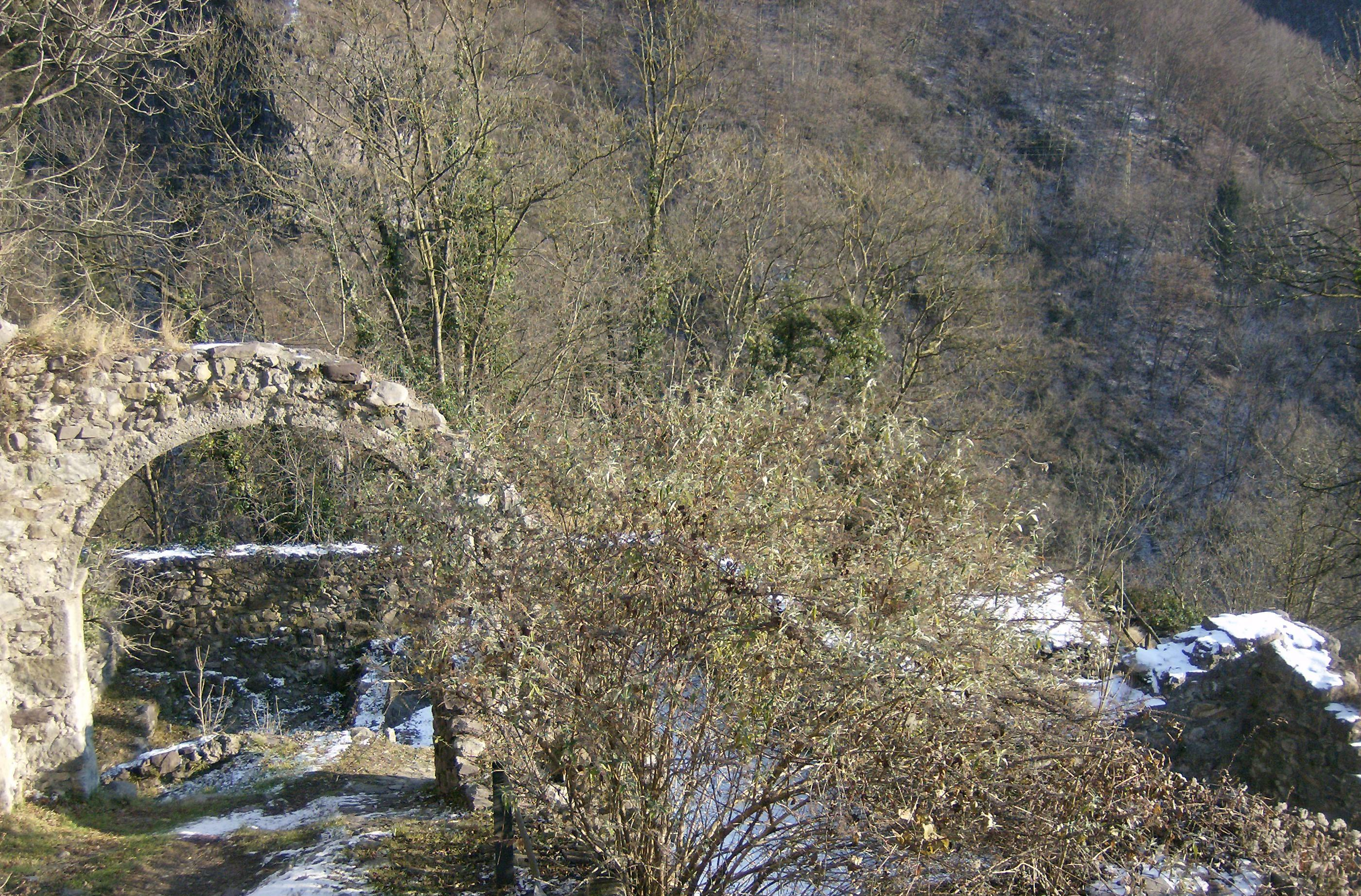
the remains of the Castle of Tasso

The community was the original home of Omodeo Tasso, the late-13th Century founder of the Princely House of Thurn and Taxis. On 14 July 1914, Simone Pianetti shot seven local burghers and fled into the mountains.
