= Piazzole =

- Commune
- Location of Piazzole
- Location within France Location within Corsica
- Coordinates: 42°23′39″N 9°24′09″E
- Country: France
- Region: Corsica
- Department: Haute-Corse
- Arrondissement: Corte
- Canton: Castagniccia

Government
  - Mayor (2020–2026): Paul Jean Emanuelli
- Area^{1}: 3.86 km^{2} (1.49 sq mi)
- Elevation: 450 m (1,480 ft)
- Highest elevation: 1,185 m (3,888 ft)
- Lowest elevation: 277 m (909 ft)
- Population (2023): 50
  - Density: 13/km^{2} (34/sq mi)
- Time zone: UTC+01:00 (CET)
  - Summer (DST): UTC+02:00 (CEST)
- INSEE/Postal code: 2B217 /20229
- ^{1} French Land Register data, which excludes lakes, ponds, glaciers > 1 km^{2} (0.386 sq mi or 247 acres) and river estuaries.

Piazzole is a commune in the Haute-Corse department of France on the island of Corsica.

== Population ==
Historical population
Year	Pop.	±% p.a.
1968	47	—
1975	39	−2.63%
1982	37	−0.75%
1990	31	−2.19%
1999	43	+3.70%
2007	47	+1.12%
2012	48	+0.42%
2017	41	−3.10%
2023	50	+3.36%
Source: INSEE

== See also ==
- Communes of the Haute-Corse department
