= Piazzolo =

- Comune
- Comune di Piazzolo
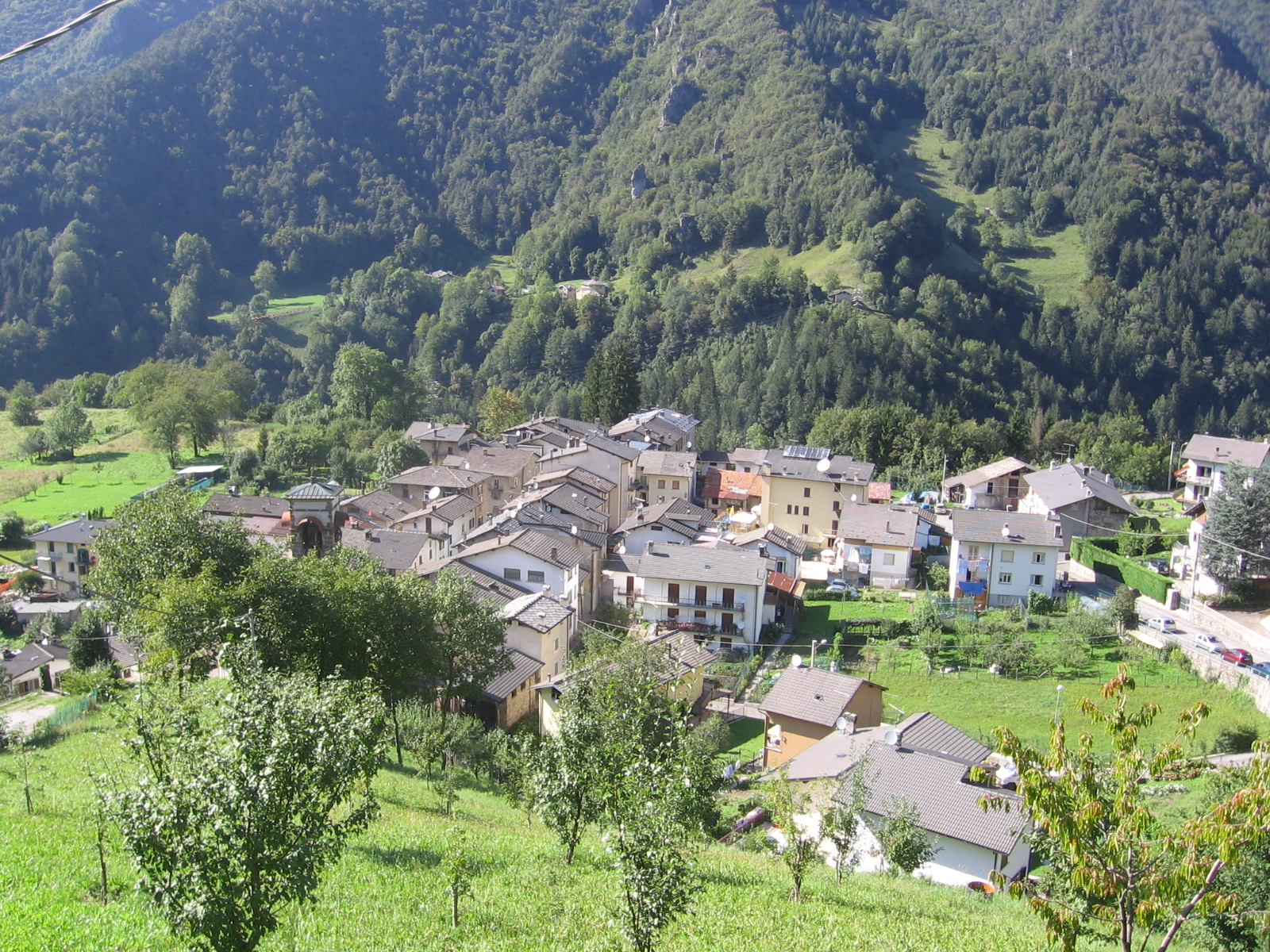
- Piazzolo

- Coat of arms

- Location within Italy Location within Lombardy
- Coordinates: 45°59′N 9°40′E
- Country: Italy
- Region: Lombardy
- Province: Province of Bergamo (BG)

Area
  - Total: 4.2 km^{2} (1.6 sq mi)
- Elevation: 702 m (2,303 ft)

Population (Dec. 2004)
  - Total: 92
  - Density: 22/km^{2} (57/sq mi)
- Demonym: Piazzolesi
- Time zone: UTC+1 (CET)
  - Summer (DST): UTC+2 (CEST)
- Postal code: 24010
- Dialing code: 0345

Piazzolo (Bergamasque: Piassöl) is a comune (municipality) in the Province of Bergamo in the Italian region of Lombardy, located about 70 kilometres (43 mi) northeast of Milan and about 30 kilometres (19 mi) north of Bergamo. As of 31 December 2004, it had a population of 92 and an area of 4.2 square kilometres (1.6 mi^{2}).

Piazzolo borders the following municipalities: Mezzoldo, Moio de' Calvi, Olmo al Brembo, Piazza Brembana, Piazzatorre, Valnegra.

In the cemetery is buried Guido Galli an Italian judge killed by the Red Brigades in the 1980s.

== Demographic evolution ==
Historical population

Year	Pop.	±%
1861	198	—
1871	213	+7.6%
1881	223	+4.7%
1901	232	+4.0%
1911	274	+18.1%

Year	Pop.	±%
1921	306	+11.7%
1931	273	−10.8%
1936	215	−21.2%
1951	236	+9.8%
1961	190	−19.5%

Year	Pop.	±%
1971	151	−20.5%
1981	129	−14.6%
1991	111	−14.0%
2001	99	−10.8%

Source: Data from ISTAT
