= Piazzolla (disambiguation) =

Piazzolla may refer to:

== People ==
- Astor Piazzolla (1921–1992), Argentine tango composer, bandoneon player, and arranger
- Margherita Piazzolla Beloch (1879–1976), Italian mathematician
- Paola Piazzolla (born 1996), Italian lightweight rower

== Places ==
- 12102 Piazzolla, an asteroid discovered by F. B. Zoltowski on May 5, 1998
- Astor Piazzolla International Airport, an airport serving Mar del Plata, an Atlantic coastal city in the Buenos Aires Province of Argentina
