= Bergamasque dialect =

Western variant of the Lombard language

Bergamasque
- Bergamàsch
- Native to: Italy
- Region: Lombardy
- Native speakers: (undated figure of 700,000)
- Language family: Indo-European: Italic; Latino-Faliscan; Romance; Italo-Western; Western Romance; Gallo-Romance; Gallo-Italic; Lombard–Piedmontese?; Lombard; Eastern Lombard; Bergamasque

Official status
- Regulated by: Ducato di Piazza Pontida

Language codes
- ISO 639-3: –
- Glottolog: berg1241
- IETF: lmo-u-sd-itbg
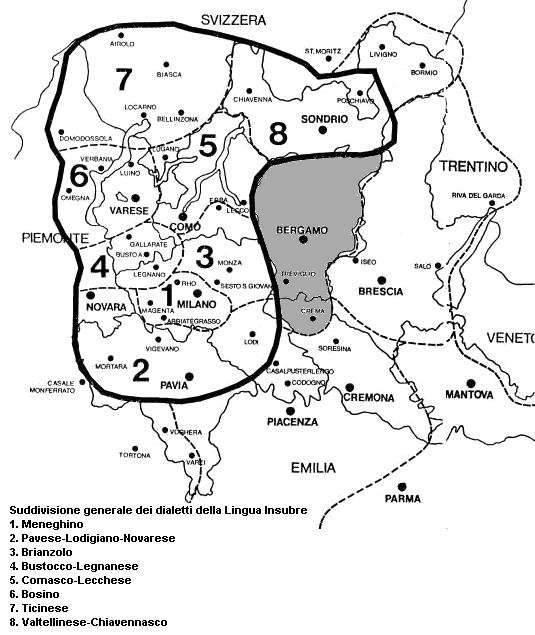

The Bergamasque dialect is the western variant of the Eastern Lombard group of the Lombard language. It is mainly spoken in the province of Bergamo and in the area around Crema, in central Lombardy.

Bergamasque has official status in the province of Bergamo, according to the Regional Law 25/2016.

== Classification ==
Bergamasque is a Romance language and belongs to the Gallo-Italic branch. Its position on the language family is genetically closer to Occitan, Catalan, French, etc. than to Italian.

== Geographic distribution ==
Bergamasque is primarily spoken in the province of Bergamo and in the area around Crema, in central Lombardy.

Bergamasque is generally mutually intelligible for speakers of Eastern Lombard's variants of neighbouring areas (i.e. from Brescia) but this is not always true for distant peripheric areas, especially in alpine valleys. Differences include either lexical, grammatical and phonetic aspects. Bergamasque is often referred to as a dialect of the Italian language; this is not correct, as Bergamasque and Italian are not mutually intelligible.

Following the migrations of the 19th and 20th centuries, the Bergamo dialect was transplanted and is spoken in various communities of southern Brazil, for example in the municipality of Botuverá.

== Speakers ==
Monolingual Bergamasque speakers are now virtually non-existent. All Lombard speakers also speak Italian, and their command of each of the two languages varies according to their geographical position as well as their socio-economic situation, the most reliable predictor being the speakers' age.

== Samples of literary works in Bergamasque ==
[...] hec mulier id est la fomna et dicitur mulier, [...] hoc ignifer id est ol bernaz et dicitur ignifer [...]

E fì senorzat da Peter e incalzat da Martì, [...] cola pena mal temprata no po fì bona letra.

— E. Zerbini, Note storiche sul dialetto bergamasco ex B. Belotti, op. cit. in note, Petrus dominatur mihi. Et Martinus insequitur me, [...] calamo quem quis male moderatus est non potest fieri bona littera

A nomo sia de Crist ol dì present
Di des comandament alegrament
I qua de de pader onnipotent
A morsis per salvar la zent.
E chi i des comandament observarà
in vita eterna cum Xristo andarà [...]

— Ex B. Belotti, op.cit.

...Se bé cognosse, chesto nost parlà
bergamasch no s'convè a lodà la zét,
gnè da fà pians, perché chi lès o sèt
al gà fà piotost gni vòia d'grignà...

— Giovanni Bressani, (1489–1560)

I armi, i fomni, i soldacc, quand che in amôr
I andava d' Marz, af voi cuntà in sti vers,
Che fü in dol tèp che con tancc furôr
Al vign de za dol mar i Mor Pervers,
Condücc dal re Gramant, so car signôr,
Che voliva più Franza e l'univers
E destrüz sech Re Carlo e i Paladì
Per vendicà sò Pader Sarasì.

— Belotti. op. cit.

Che per spiegass bé e spert, sciassegh e stagn
a tate lengue ch'è montade in scagn,
al Fiorentì, al Franses
la nost lagh dà neuf per andà ai dès.
[...]
Mi per efett de ver amour, de stima,
Lavori e pensi in prima
A i mè compatriogg a i mè terèr;
E dopo, se 'l men vansa, a i forestèr.

— ex Belotti, op. cit.

Al vé vià quacc diàvoi chi gh'è mai
Al segn de quel teribel orchesù.
De pura 'l sa sgörlè i mür infernai.
E serè fò Proserpina i balcù;
I è röse e fiur, borasche e temporai,
Tempeste e sömelèc, saete e tru,
E a par de quel tremàs là zo de sot,
L'è cöcagna balurda 'l teremòt.

— ex Belotti, op. cit.

== Another example ==
The Lord's Prayer

English-

Our Father who art in heaven, Hallowed be thy name. Thy kingdom come. Thy will be done on earth as it is in heaven. Give us this day our daily bread, and forgive us our trespasses, as we forgive those who trespass against us, and lead us not into temptation, but deliver us from evil.

Italian-

Padre nostro, che sei nei cieli, sia santificato il tuo nome, venga il tuo regno, sia fatta la tua volontà, come in cielo così in terra. Dacci oggi il nostro pane quotidiano, e rimetti a noi i nostri debiti come noi li rimettiamo ai nostri debitori, e non ci indurre in tentazione, ma liberaci dal male. Amen.

Bergamasque-

Pader nòst che te sé in cél a'l sìes santificàt ol tò nòm, a'l végne 'l tò régn, la sìes facia la tò olontà cóme in cél, isé 'n tèra. Daga 'ncö ol nòst pà de töcc i dé e pàghega i nòscc débecc cóme nóter m' ghi paga ai nòscc debitùr faga mìa börlà in tentassiù, ma sàlvega del mal. Amen.

== Bibliography ==
- Bortolo Belotti, Storia di Bergamo e dei bergamaschi.
- Carmelo Francia, Emanuele Gambarini, Dizionario italiano-bergamasco, Bergamo, Grafital, 2001.
- Carmelo Francia, Emanuele Gambarini, Dizionario bergamasco-italiano, Bergamo, Grafital, 2004.
- Umberto Zanetti, La grammatica bergamasca, Bergamo, Sestante, 2004. ISBN 88-87445-59-1.
- Paganessi, Giulia (2017). Brazilian Bergamasch: an Italian language spoken in Botuverá (Santa Catarina, Brazil) (MA). Leiden University. hdl:1887/52581.
