= Angelo Baschenis =

- Born: 1450?
- Died: 1504? (54?)

Angelo Baschenis (documented from 1450 to 1504) was an Italian painter, belonging to one of the most popular workshops of itinerant painters present in the Bergamo area and Trentino.

== Biography ==
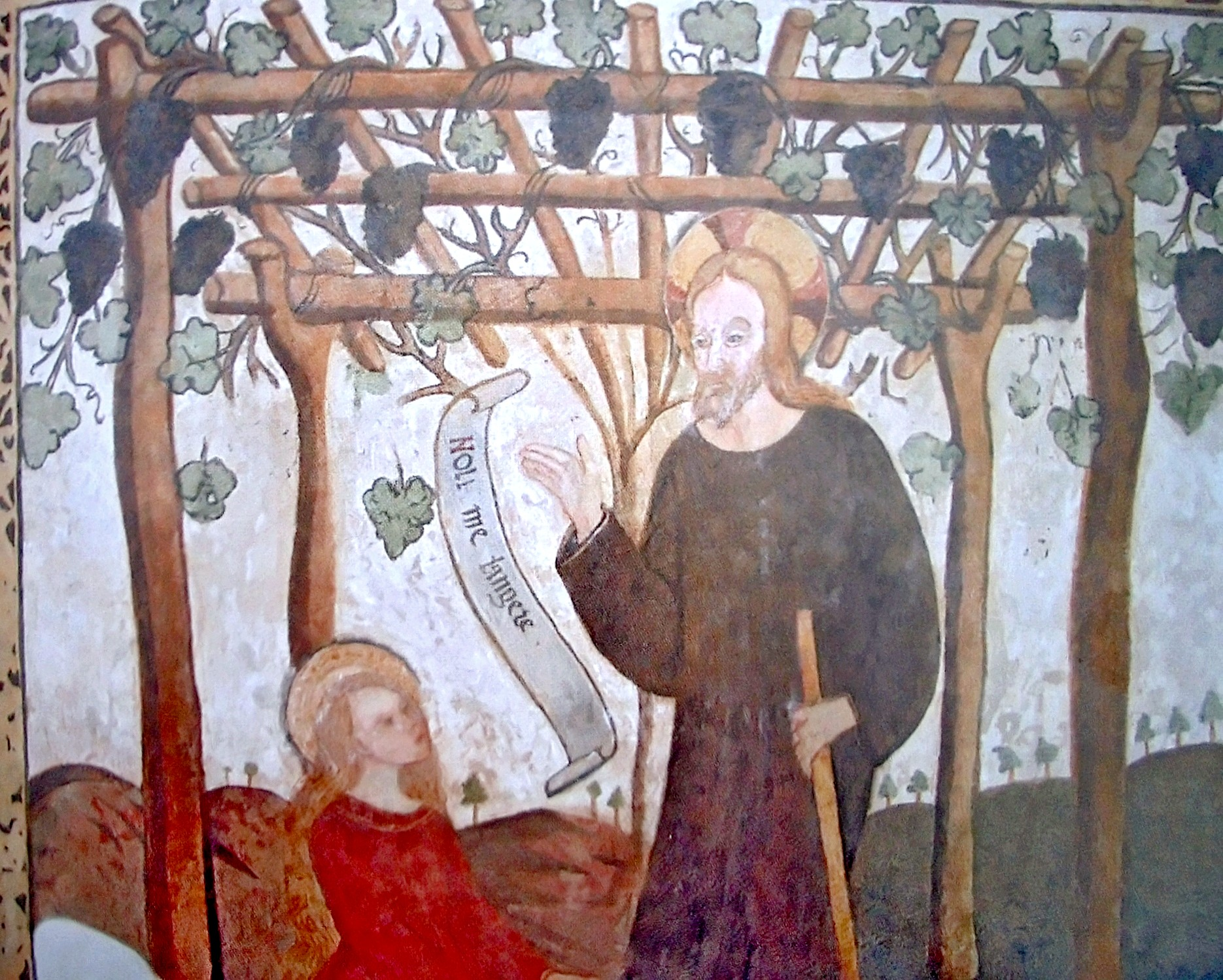
Noli me tangere, Pinzolo, church of San Vigilio

The Baschenis family, originally from the frazione of Colla in the mountain municipality of Santa Brigida (BG), constitutes an interesting example of a frescanti workshop who, starting from the mid-15th century, handed down their trade from father to son for centuries.

Angelo was the son of Giacomo and brother of Antonio, scion of the so-called Lanfranco dynasty, one of two strains of the family.

The first news of Angelo's pictorial production dates back to 1482, the year in which we find him busy frescoing the presbytery of the church of San Defendente in Roncola in Imagna valley.

In Ornica in Val Brembana, Angelo created an important cycle of frescoes signed and dated 15 in the parish church of Sant'Ambrogio. November 1485 next to the writing Angelus de Averaria pinxit una cum filio suo.

They cover the apse of the ancient Gothic church with cross vault (later used as a sacristy).

The Episodes from the life of San Nicola da Tolentino, a Crucifixion and other frescoes in the ancient parish church of Santa Brigida are attributed to Angelo Baschenis, dating back to the penultimate decade of the 15th century.

Later Angelo worked in Trentino; the frescoes of the church of San Giovanni Battista in Flavon are attributed to him where we find the Christ, the Evangelists, the Doctors of the Church, represented in the vault of the apse the Coronation of Mary and, on the walls of the apse, various episodes of the Life of Saint John the Baptist. An Annunciation and the figures of Adam and Eve appear on the triumphal arch; on the left wall there is a fresco dedicated to San Nicola da Tolentino, while on the right there is a Madonna Enthroned with Child dated 1485.

On the south wall of the church of San Vigilio in Pinzolo we find four panels signed ("Angelus de Averara pinxit") and dated (26 May 1490); it is a Madonna Enthroned with Child and four episodes from the life of Christ: the Disbelief of Thomas, the Noli me tangere (episode curiously set in a vineyard ), the Descent into Limbo and the Ascent into heaven. The painter still uses a fully Gothic language; the didactic intentions desired by the client shine through in it, not without a marked human piety, as appears in the figure of the Magdalene of Noli me tangere and in the face of the Madonna Enthrond.

The fresco paintings present in the church of San Ludovico in Bretto a small hamlet of Camerata Cornello dated 1504 are assigned to him.

== Bibliography ==
- Valagussa, Giovanni, ed. (2020). "Bretto (Camerata Cornello)". I pittori Baschenis: itinerari bergamaschi. Bergamo: Corponove - BG. ISBN 978-88-99219-94-9.
