= Giovanni Baschenis =

Italian painter (1471–1503)

- Born: 1471
- Died: 1503 (aged 31–32)

Giovanni Baschenis (1471–1503) was an Italian painter whose name is combined with that of his brother Battista, also a painter.

== Biography ==
Giovanni Baschenis was the son of Antonio belonging to the dynasty of the Lanfranco family and nephew of Angelo. Some paintings created by Giovanni Baschenis were also linked to the name of Battista, who was probably the brother with the sole duties of assistant.

Giovanni began his artistic activity in Trentino with his brother, but upon returning to Bergamo he continued his activity independently.

In Trentino the two painters signed the frescoes for the chapel of San Valerio in Castel Valer in Tassullo, those of the Church of Santi Filippo and Giacomo in Segonzone (in the municipality of Campodenno) and those always present in Val di Non in the church of Sant'Udalrico in Corte Inferiore (Noise); here, the fresco dated 1471 of the'Last Supper has the writing Joha[n]nes et Baptista de Averaria pinxeru[n]t 1471.

Giovanni returned to the Bergamo area, his homeland, frescoing the Casa Volpi in Fuipiano al Brembo. The fresco Christ on the tomb between Mary and John has the writing Ritius filius quodam Zani hoc opus fieri and die 4 novembris 1486 in the upper part. The work depicts a red tomb, with Christ supported by the Mother on the right, and Saint John praying on the left. The upper part has a long writing with instructions for obtaining the indulgence. The cartouche reports an error in the indication of the years of the indulgence named in twenty-two thousand years. At the bottom he signs Johannes de Avaia pixit.

A second fresco is the Madonna and Child among the Saints. The fresco lacks that plasticity that would make the work Renaissance in orientation, the cloak of the Madonna with the printed flowers gives solemnity to the whole work.

In the sacristy of the church in the Alino hamlet of San Pellegrino Terme, there is the fresco signed and dated 1478 depicting the Original Sin which presents us with Eve who, with the apple in her hand, covers herself and reveals herself naked, and Adam in 'act of touching your throat as if to feel the Adam's apple grow. In the sacristy there is a further fresco Theory of the Saints which is the depiction of five saints: John the Baptist, Saint Blaise, Mary Magdalene, Saint Defendente and the central image of Saint Catherine of Alexandria in the act of being crowned by two angels. The work is dated 1470 and was attributed to Giovanni Baschenis by Luigi Angelini.

The frescoes depicting San Defendente housed in the apse of the Church of San Defendente in the locality Roncola date back to 1482. In 1490 he frescoed the church of San Lorenzo of Cunevo.

== See also ==
- Averara

== Bibliography ==
- AA.VV. (September 2020). Giovanni Valagussa (ed.). I pittori Baschenis Itinerari bergamaschi. Bergamo: Corponove.
- AA.VV. Virginia Ceruti (2004). Baschenis. Provincia di Bergamo.
- William Belli (2008). Itinerari dei Baschenis. Giudicarie, Val Rendena, Val di Non e Val di Sole. Trento: Provincia Autonoma di Trento. Assessorato alla Cultura.
- Mara Collini, Corredo documentario relativo alle vicende genealogiche dei pittori Baschenis, in «Libri e Documenti», 8, fasc. I, 1982, pp. 8-32. (online)
- Silvana Milesi (1993). La stirpe dei Bascheris:sguardi sul Quattrocento e sul seicento. Bergamo: Carpanove editrice.
- Antonio Morassi, I pittori Baschenis nel Trentino, in «Studi Trentini di Scienze Storiche», 8, 1927, pp. 201-224. (online)
- Claudia Paternoster, La Cappella di San Valerio a Castel Valér e gli affreschi di Giovanni e Battis
- ta Baschenis del 1473, in «Studi trentini di scienze storiche. Sezione seconda», 79, 2000, pp. 9-48. (online)
- AA.VV. (September 2020). Giovanni Valagussa (ed.). The Baschenis painters Bergamo itineraries. Bergamo: Corponove. ISBN 9788899219949.
- AA.VV. Virginia Ceruti (2004). Baschenis. Province of Bergamo.
- William Belli (2008). Itineraries of the Baschenis. Giudicarie, Val Rendena, Val di Non and Val di Sole. Trento: Autonomous Province of Trento. Department of Culture.
- Mara Collini, Documentary kit relating to the genealogical events of the Baschenis painters, in «Books and Documents», 8, fasc. I, 1982, pp. 8-32. (online)
- Silvana Milesi (1993). La stirpe dei Bascheri: scorci sui secoli XV e XVII. Bergamo: Carpanove editrice.
- Antonio Morassi, The Baschenis painters in Trentino, in «Studi Trentini di Scienze Storiche», 8, 1927, pp. 201-224. (online)
- Claudia Paternoster, The Chapel of San Valerio in Castel Valér and the frescoes of Giovanni and Battista Baschenis from 1473, in «Trentino studies of historical sciences. Second section», 79, 2000, pp. 9-48. (online)
