= Cusio =

Cusio may refer to:

- Cusio, Lombardy, a comune in the Province of Bergamo, Italy
- Lake Orta, a lake in Piedmont, Italy
