= Defendente =

Defendente may refer to:

- Defendens, a martyr of the Theban Legion
- Defendente Ferrari (c. 1480/1485 – c. 1540), an Italian painter active in Piedmont
