= Valtorta =

Valtorta may refer to:

- Valtorta, Lombardy, a comune in the Province of Bergamo
- Maria Valtorta (1897–1961), Italian writer and author of The Poem of the Man God
