= Sant'Egidio, Fontanella =

Former church in Italy

Coordinates: 45°43′00″N 9°30′57″E

Sant'Egidio is a former monastic chapel or church, once part of a Cluniac abbey, located in a rural district in the town limits of Fontanella, province of Bergamo, region of Lombardy, Italy. The structure retains Romanesque architectural elements and has frescoes dating from the 12th and 15th centuries. Some of the frescoes were by Cristoforo Baschenis il Vecchio.

== History ==
Under the patronage of Alberto da Prezzate, a church and a monastery at this site was first begun in 1080. However the remote location appears to have only housed the monastery by the 12th-century. The monastery suffered from the schismatic disputes of this period. This was compounded by the plague in 1348, which meant the abbey in 1350 only housed six monks. The abbey did not fare well under the Visconti, who were eager to diminish the income of the abbey. In 1428, Bergamo vell under Venetian rule, and the republic helped restore some of the abbeys in the region. In 1451, the prior of the abbey was also to bishop of Bergamo, Giovanni Barozzi. In 1473, pope Sixtus IV closed the monastery of Fontanella.

In 1998, the bishop of Bergamo, Roberto Amadei made this a cappella vescovile (bishop's chapel), assigned a rector, and began a restoration.
