= Antonio Baschenis =

Italian painter

- Born: 1450-1470
- Died: 1475
- Children: Bartolomeo, Battista, and Giacomo

Antonio Baschenis (documented from 1450 to 1470 to 1475) was an Italian painter, belonging to one of the most popular workshops of itinerant painters present in the Bergamo area and in Trentino.

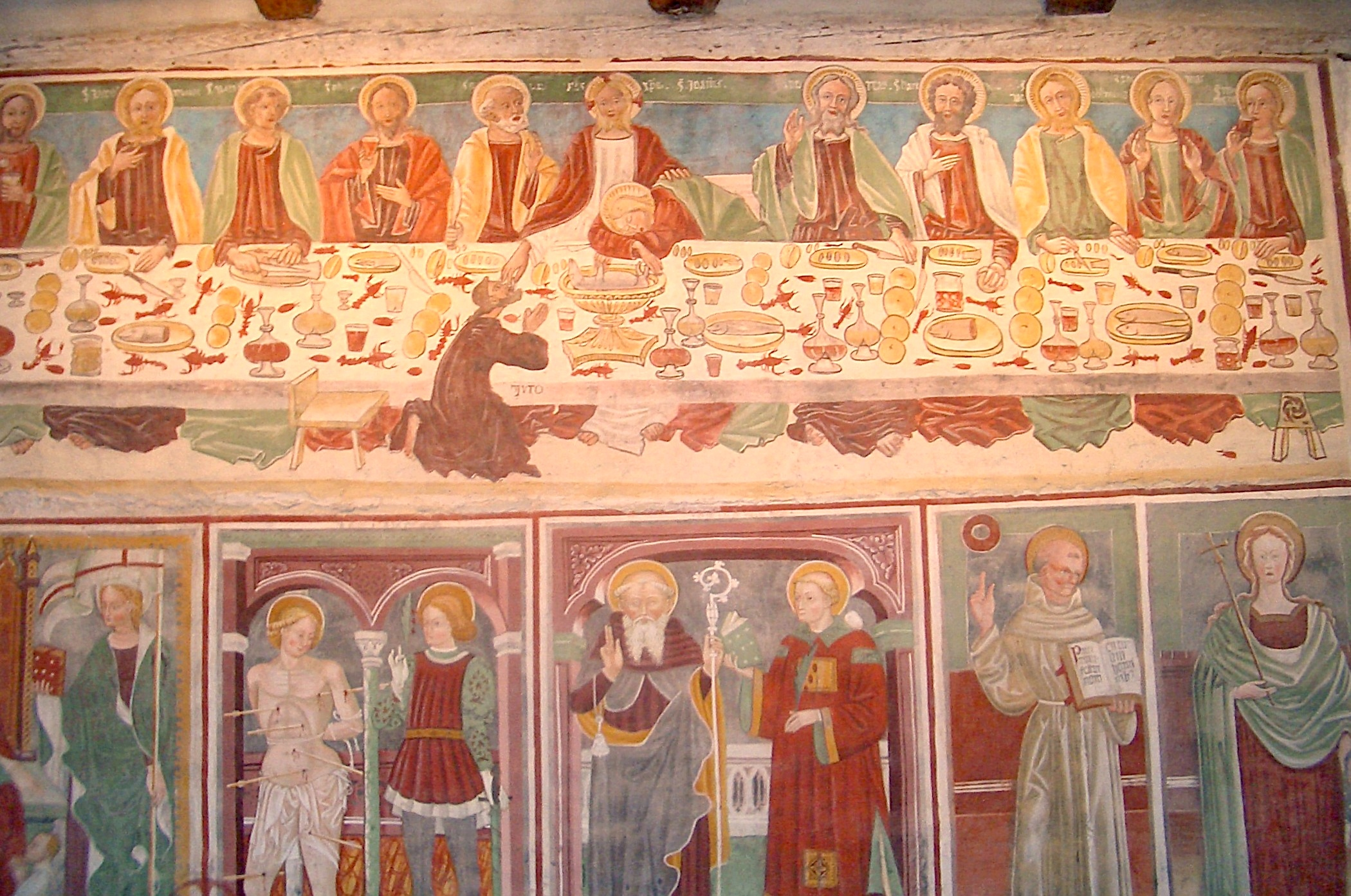
Carisolo, church of San Vigilio, frescoes on the right wall

The Baschenis family, originally from the hamlet of Colla in the mountain municipality of Santa Brigida (BG), constitutes an interesting example of a fresco painter's workshop who, starting in the mid-15th century, handed down their trade from father to son for centuries.

Antonio was the brother of Angelo, a scion of the so-called Lanfranco dynasty, one of the two strains of the family. Son of Giacomo and nephew of Lanfranco, in 1451 he hadave a shop near the church of San Michele all'arco in Bergamo.

He was the first of the Baschenis to move to Trentino, where, in 1461, he received a commission to decorate the right wall of the church of Santo Stefano in Carisolo in fresco. The decorative apparatus includes a Last Supper and in the lower register two Madonnas enthroned with children and figures of saints (from the left we find a saint identifiable, due to the presence of the "vexillum Regis," with Saint Ursula), followed by two panels with couples of saints, Saint Sebastian and San Giuliano, Anthony the Great and Santo Stefano, then Bernardino of Siena, and finally a saint who is not easy to identify.

It cannot be excluded that this last figure represents Saint Bridget of Sweden, which arises from the presence of the thin and elongated stick, surmounted by the cross used as an iconographic element.

Antonio appears to have already died between 1470 and 1475; consider the homonymy of these artists, which makes it difficult not only to assign the different works but also to recognize that the Scipioni family was the same as the Baschenis. Antonio had three sons: Bartolomeo, Battista, and Giacomo, probably also the authors of some works.

In Trentino, Antonio Baschenis worked inside the church of San Vigilio in Pinzolo and in the church of Mione, a hamlet in the municipality of Rumo, where he painted the Madonna and Child with Saint Catherine, signed and dated 1480.

== Gallery ==
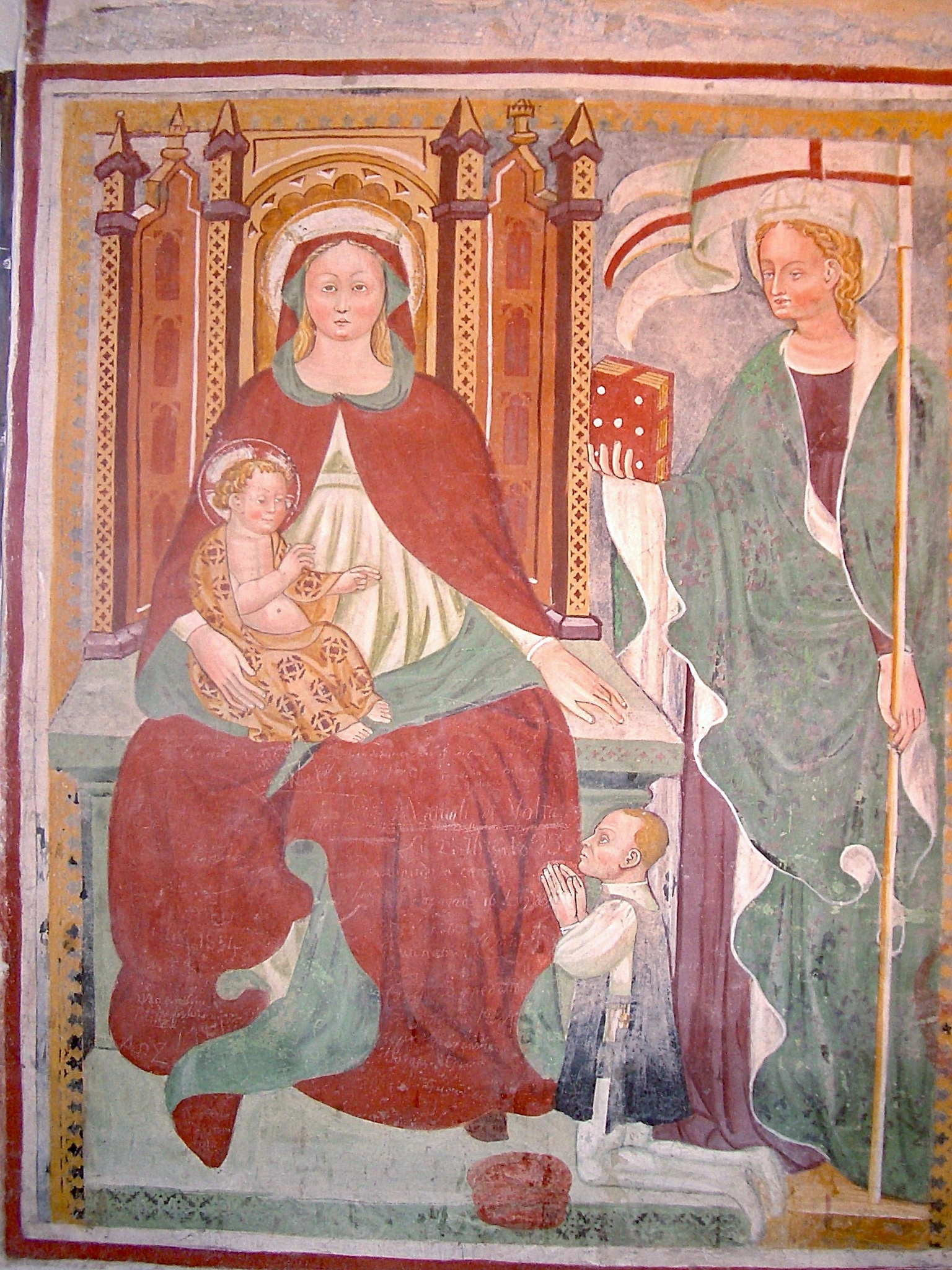
Madonna in trono col Bambino e Santa Orsola(?), Carisolo, chiesa di Santo Stefano

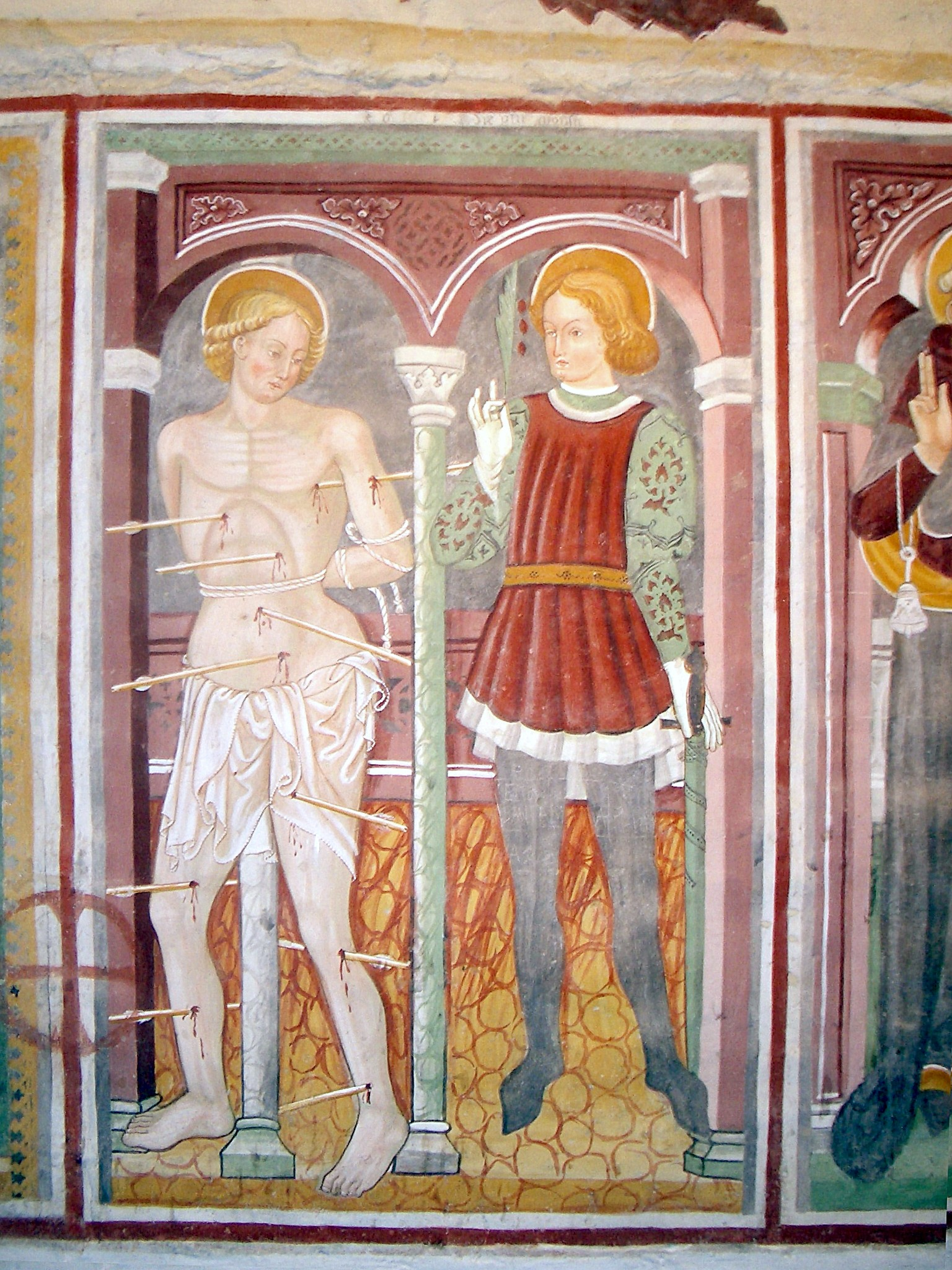
San Sebastiano e San Giuliano, Carisolo, chiesa di Santo Stefano

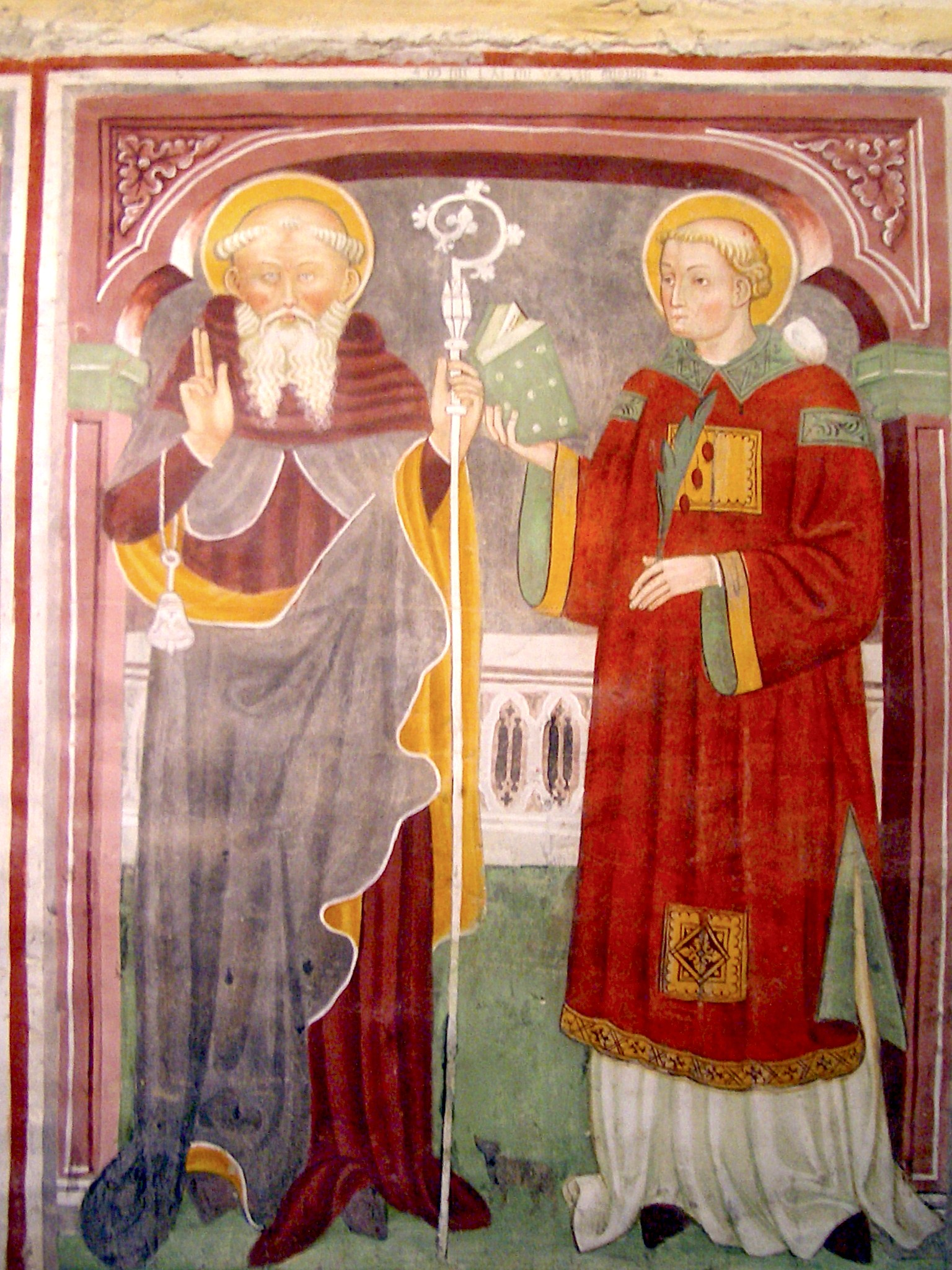
Sant'Antonio Abate e San Stefano,

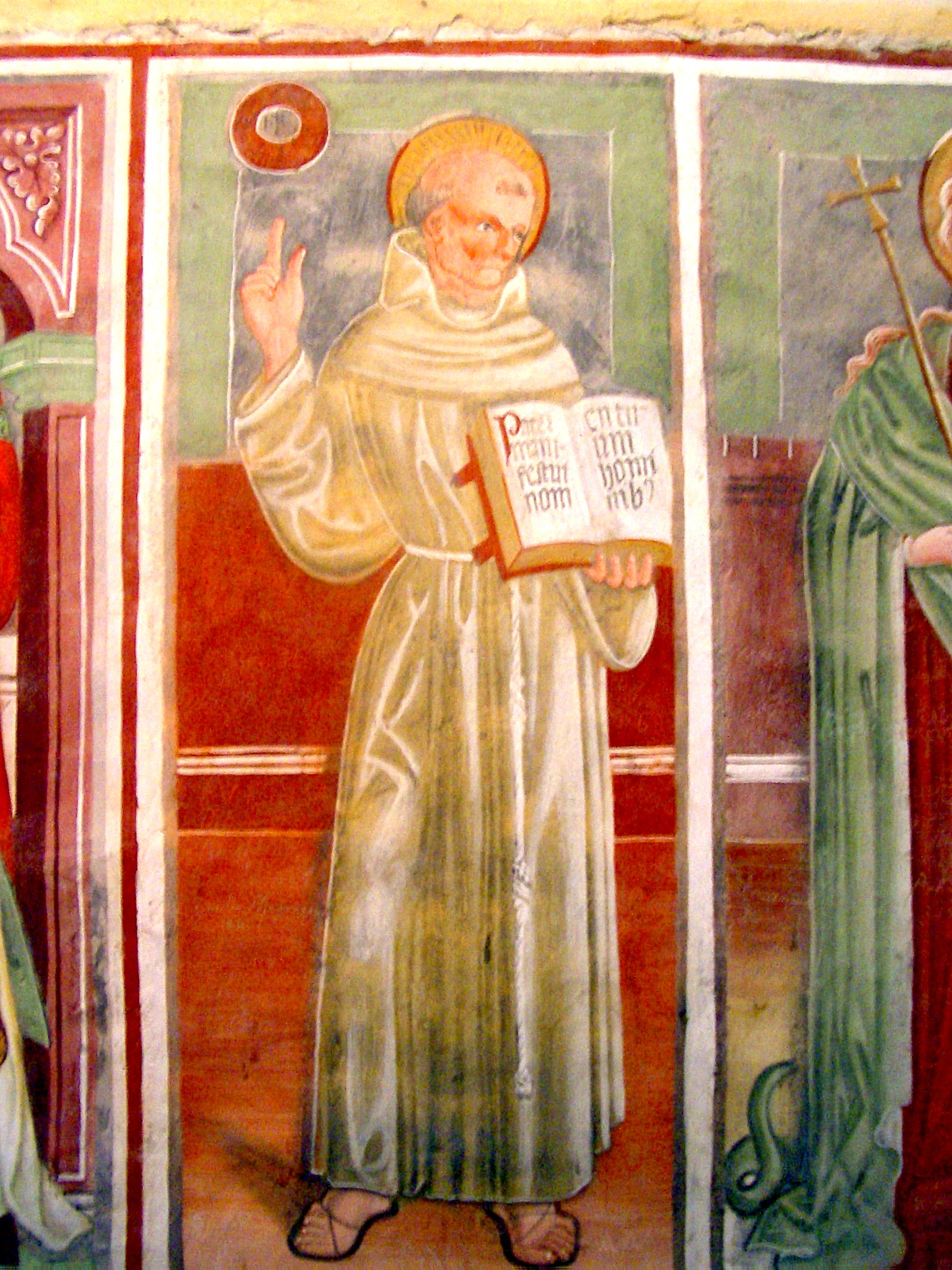
San Bernardino da Siena, Carisolo, chiesa di Santo Stefano
