= Baschenis =

Baschenis was an Italian family of artists, mainly painters.

== Lanfranco dynasty ==
- Antonio Baschenis (1450/1490)
- Angelo Baschenis (1450/1490)
  - Giovanni Baschenis (1471/1503)
  - Battista Baschenis (1471/1503)

== Cristoforo dynasty ==
- Cristoforo I Baschenis (doc. 1465/1475)
  - Dionisio Baschenis (doc. 1493)
  - Simone I Baschenis (doc. 1488/1503)
    - Cristoforo II Baschenis (doc. 1472/1520)
      - Simone II Baschenis (1495 ca. /1555)
        - Filippo Baschenis (doc. 1537/ 1596)
        - Cristoforo Baschenis il Vecchio (1520 ca/1613 ca.)
          - Cristoforo Baschenis il Giovane (1560 ca./1626 ca.)
            - Pietro Baschenis (1590 ca./1630)
              - Evaristo Baschenis (1617 - 1677)
              - Bartolomeo Baschenis

== Others ==
- Marcello Baschenis (1829–1888), Italian painter
