= Pizzo Tre Signori =

Mountain in Italy

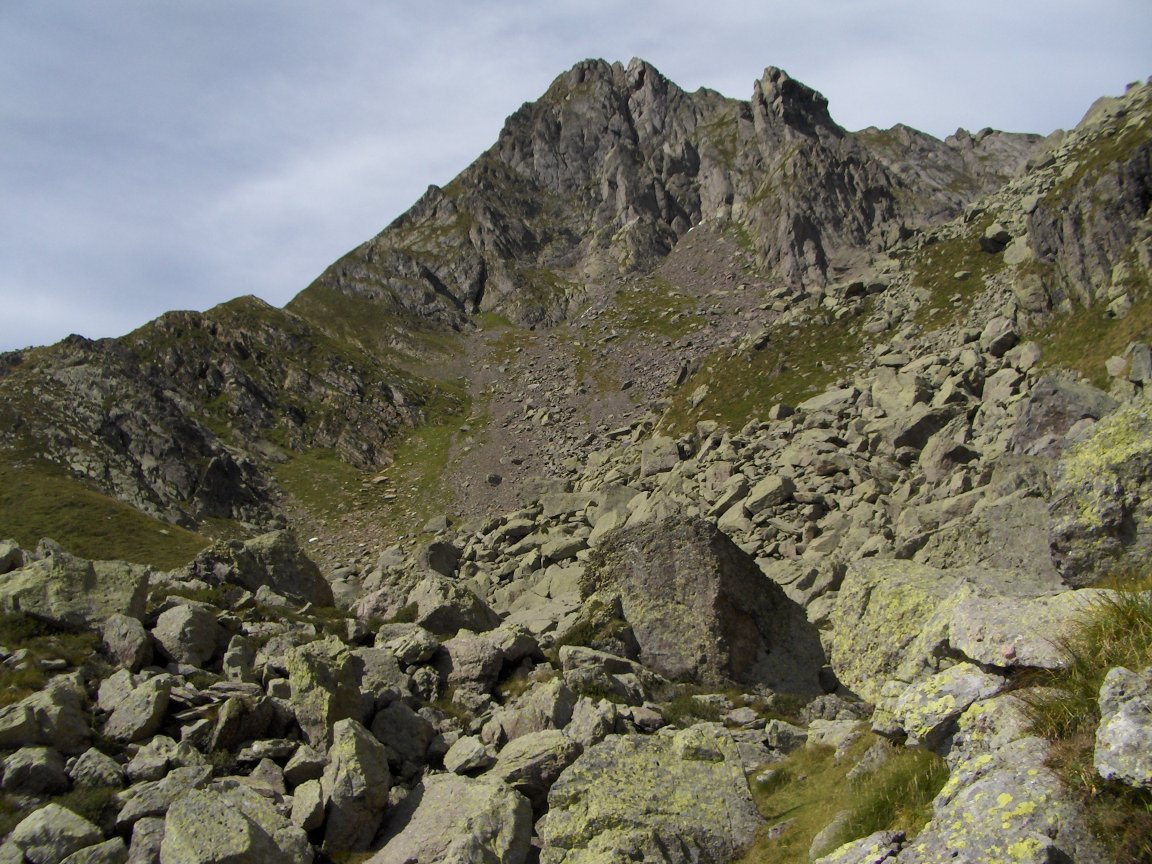
- The Pizzo Tre Signori from the Ornica side

Highest point
- Elevation: 2,554 m (8,379 ft)
- Coordinates: 46°00′00″N 9°32′00″E

Naming
- English translation: Three Lords Peak
- Language of name: Italian

Geography
- Location within Alps
- Location: Lombardy, Italy
- Parent range: Bergamo Alps

Pizzo Tre Signori is a mountain in the Bergamo Alps, with an elevation of 2,554 metres (8,379 ft).

== Etymology ==
The name stems from the historical division of the area that it marked, between the State of Milan, the Republic of Venice and the Grisons canton of Switzerland.

== Geography ==
The mountain is located between the Valtellina, Val Brembana and Valsassina. It represents the tripoint between the Italian provinces of Sondrio, Lecco and Bergamo.

=== SOIUSA classification ===
According to the SOIUSA (International Standardized Mountain Subdivision of the Alps) the mountain can be classified in the following way:

- main part = Eastern Alps
- major sector = Southern Limestone Alps
- section = Bergamasque Alps and Prealps
- subsection = Bergamo Alps
- supergroup = Orobie Occidentali
- group = Gruppo del Tre Signori
- code = II/C-29.I-B.6
