= Cassiglio =

- Comune
- Comune di Cassiglio
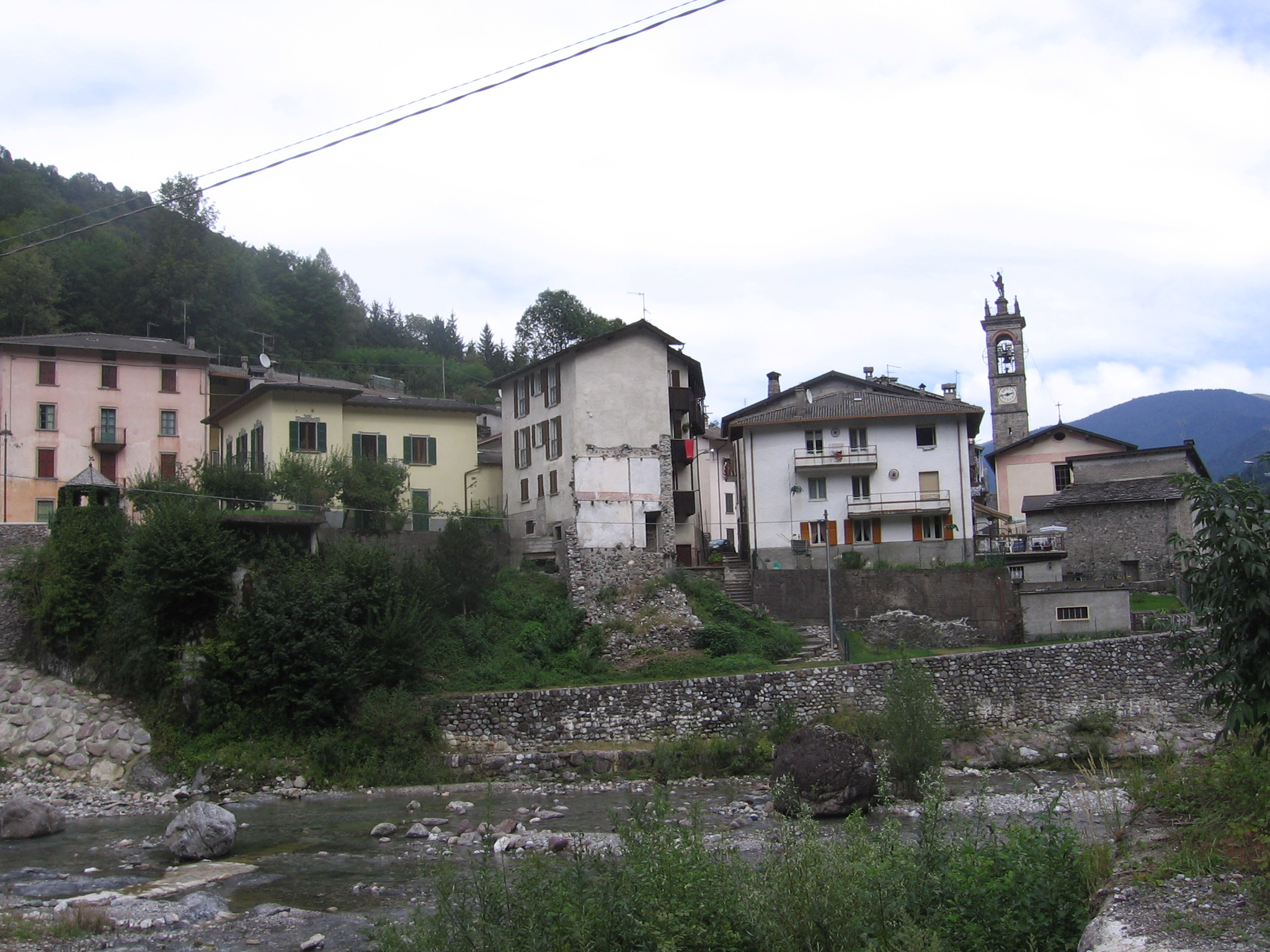
- Cassiglio

- Coat of arms

- Location within Italy Location within Lombardy
- Coordinates: 45°58′N 9°37′E
- Country: Italy
- Region: Lombardy
- Province: Bergamo (BG)

Government
  - Mayor: Silvia Lodedo

Area
  - Total: 13.68 km^{2} (5.28 sq mi)
- Elevation: 602 m (1,975 ft)

Population (30 November 2017)
  - Total: 110
  - Density: 8.0/km^{2} (21/sq mi)
- Demonym: Cassigliesi
- Time zone: UTC+1 (CET)
  - Summer (DST): UTC+2 (CEST)
- Postal code: 24010
- Dialing code: 0345

Cassiglio (Bergamasque: Cassèi) is a comune (municipality) in the Province of Bergamo in the northern Italian region of Lombardy, located about 100 kilometres (62 mi) northeast of Milan and about 45 kilometres (28 mi) north of Bergamo.

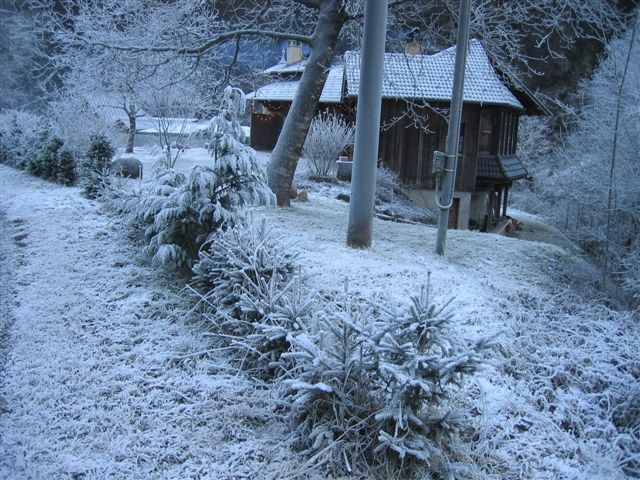
A view of Cassiglio's territory on the banks of Stabino during winter.

Cassiglio borders the following municipalities: Camerata Cornello, Cusio, Olmo al Brembo, Ornica, Piazza Brembana, Santa Brigida, Taleggio, Valtorta, Vedeseta.

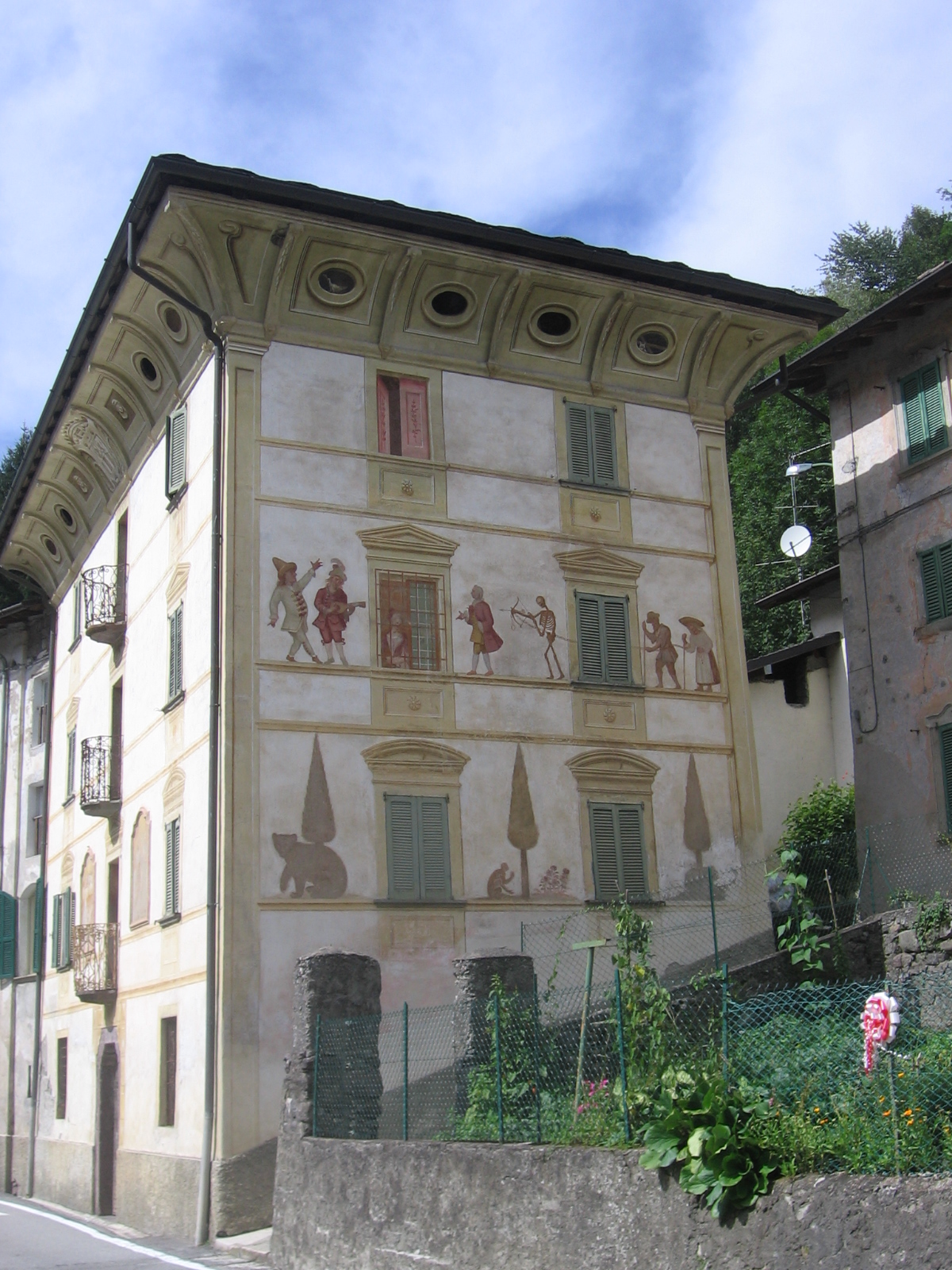
Milesi House with its frescoed façade
