= Cristoforo I Baschenis =

Italian painter

- Born: 1465?
- Died: 1490?

Cristoforo I Baschenis (documented from 1465 to 1490) was an Italian painter, belonging to one of the most popular workshops of itinerant painters present in the Bergamo area and in Trentino.

== Biography and works ==
Christopher I is the progenitor, in a pictorial sense, of one of the two branches of the Baschenis family.

It appears from documentary sources that he was resident in Colla, a hamlet of Santa Brigida, Rome (BG) and that he stayed for some time in Brescia; but - as far as is known - he worked mainly in Trentino.

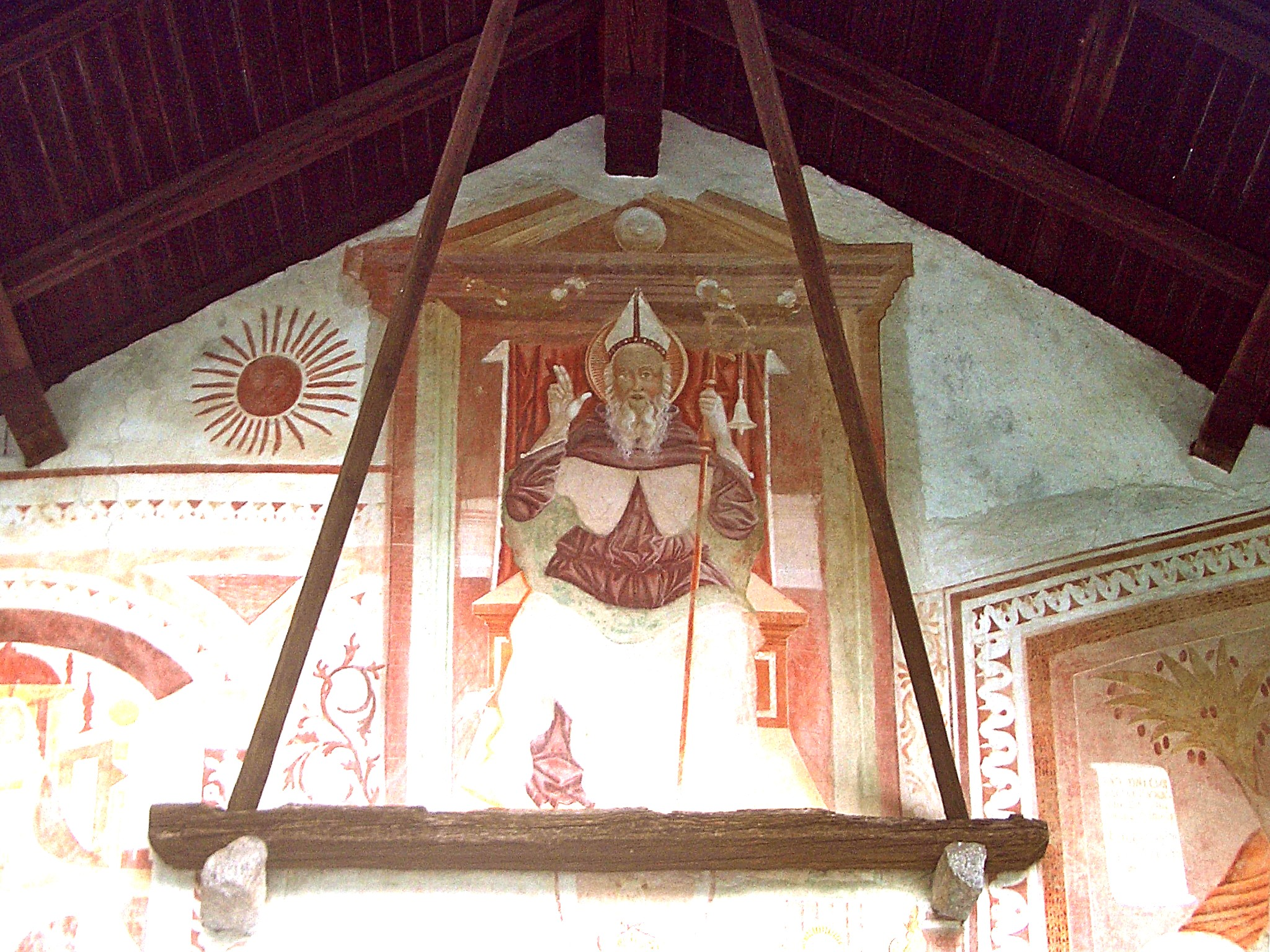
Sant'Antonio Abate, facade fresco, 1474, Pelugo, church of Sant'Antonio Abate.

In 1474, he was in Pelugo in Val Rendena where on the facade of the cemetery church dedicated to Sant'Antonio Abate, under the pitch of the roof, he painted a large image of the saint dedicatee. It is his only work of certain attribution, signed and dated (6 October 1474). It is a fresco which testifies to some attention to the novelties Renaissance art which spread in Lombardy in the second half of the Fifteenth century.

Regarding this work it has been observed:

. The figure of that Saint ... is highlighted by his elegant style, ... as can be seen from the darting folds of his robes, ... and the not excessively marked contours . The face of Saint Anthony does not have that hieratic severity, typical of the Gothic and late Gothic, and appears in a good-natured, immediate aspect, which seems to accompany the blessing gesture of the right hand. If we then observe the aedicule and the seat, in their Renaissance architecture, we realize more the diversity of the work compared to the author's original tradition.

— Luigi Loprete, "The frescoes of the church of Sant'Antonio Abate in Pelugo" in AA.VV., The church of Sant'Antonio Abate in Pelugo, op cit., pag. 48 and 52

On the basis of stylistic affinities, other fresco panels that decorate the façade can be attributed to Cristoforo I: the Madonna with Child, the SS. Trinity, the'Annunciation, the Procession and San Giorgio.

== Bibliography ==
- L. Loprete, The Baschenis in Trentino, in Giornale Italiano d'Europa, September, 1982
- AA.VV., The church of Sant'Antonio Abate in Pelugo, Parish of San Zeno Pelugo, 1994
