= Valtorta, Lombardy =

Valtorta
- Comune
- Comune di Valtorta
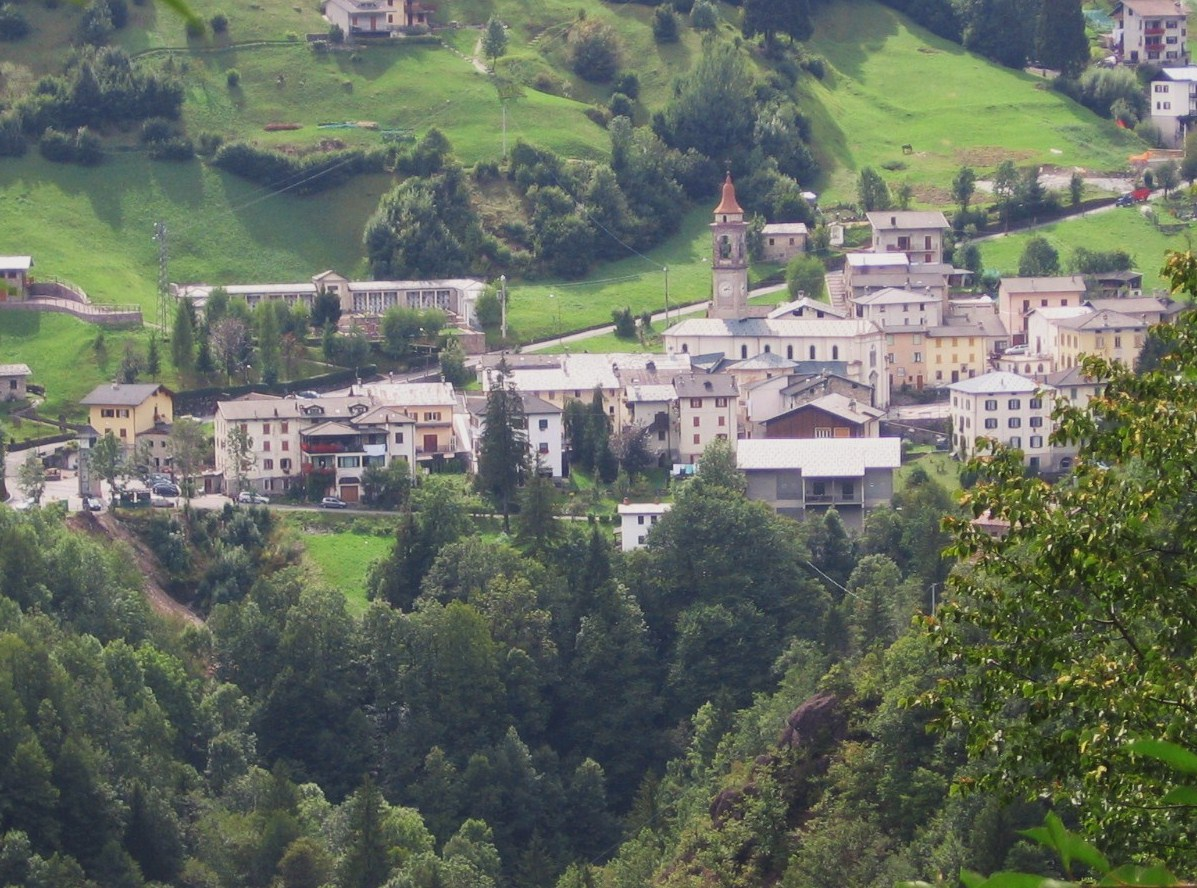
- Valtorta

- Coat of arms

- Location within Italy Location within Lombardy
- Coordinates: 45°59′N 9°32′E
- Country: Italy
- Region: Lombardy
- Province: Bergamo (BG)

Government
  - Mayor: Antonio Regazzoni

Area
  - Total: 30.9 km^{2} (11.9 sq mi)
- Elevation: 935 m (3,068 ft)

Population (30 April 2017)
  - Total: 271
  - Density: 8.77/km^{2} (22.7/sq mi)
- Demonym: Valtortesi
- Time zone: UTC+1 (CET)
  - Summer (DST): UTC+2 (CEST)
- Postal code: 24010
- Dialing code: 0345
- Patron saint: Assumption of Mary
- Saint day: 15 August
- Website: Official website

Valtorta (Bergamasque: Altòrta) is a comune (municipality) in the Province of Bergamo in the Italian region of Lombardy, located about 60 kilometres (37 mi) northeast of Milan and about 35 kilometres (22 mi) northwest of Bergamo.

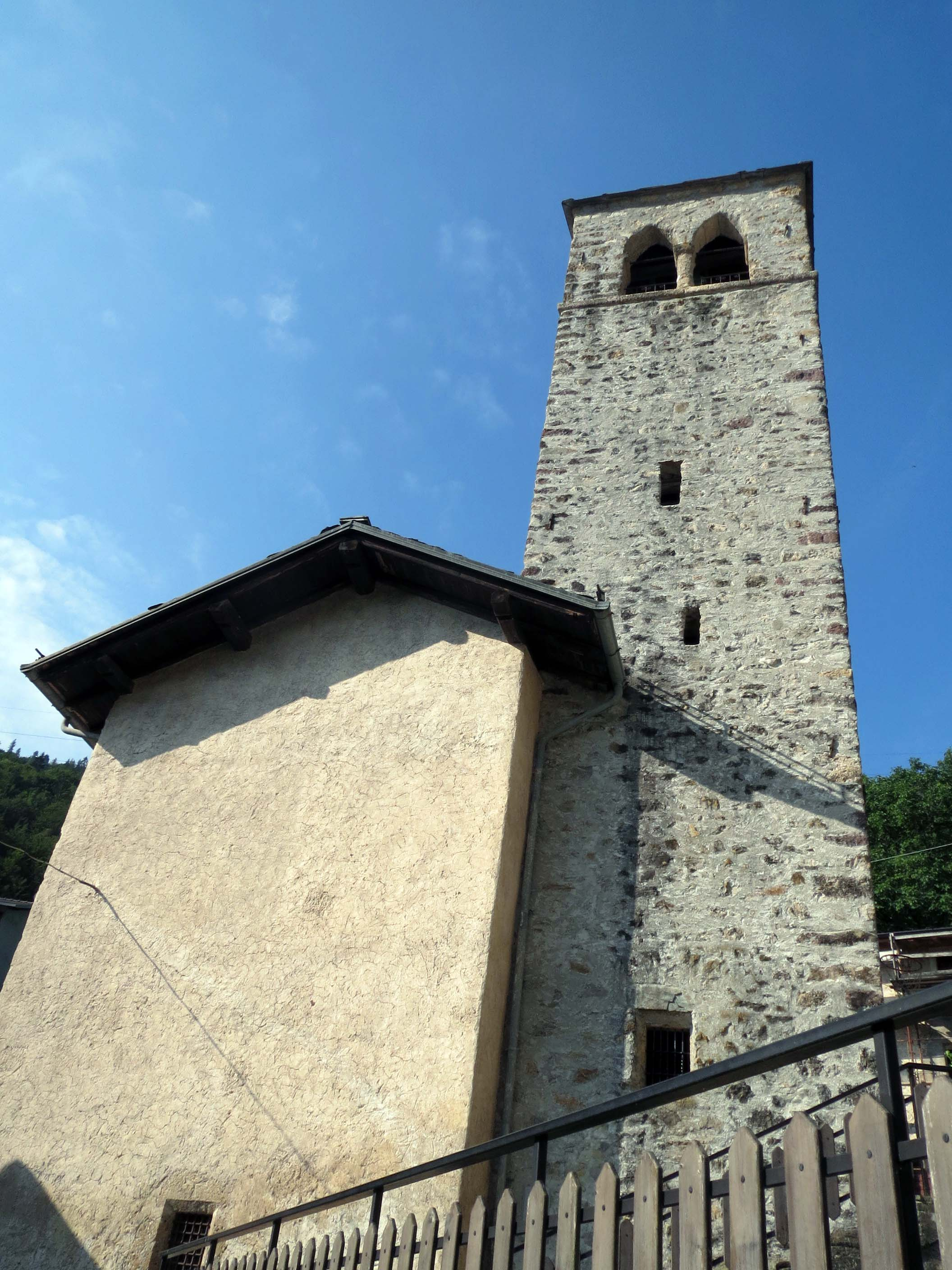
Sant'Antonio Abate tower

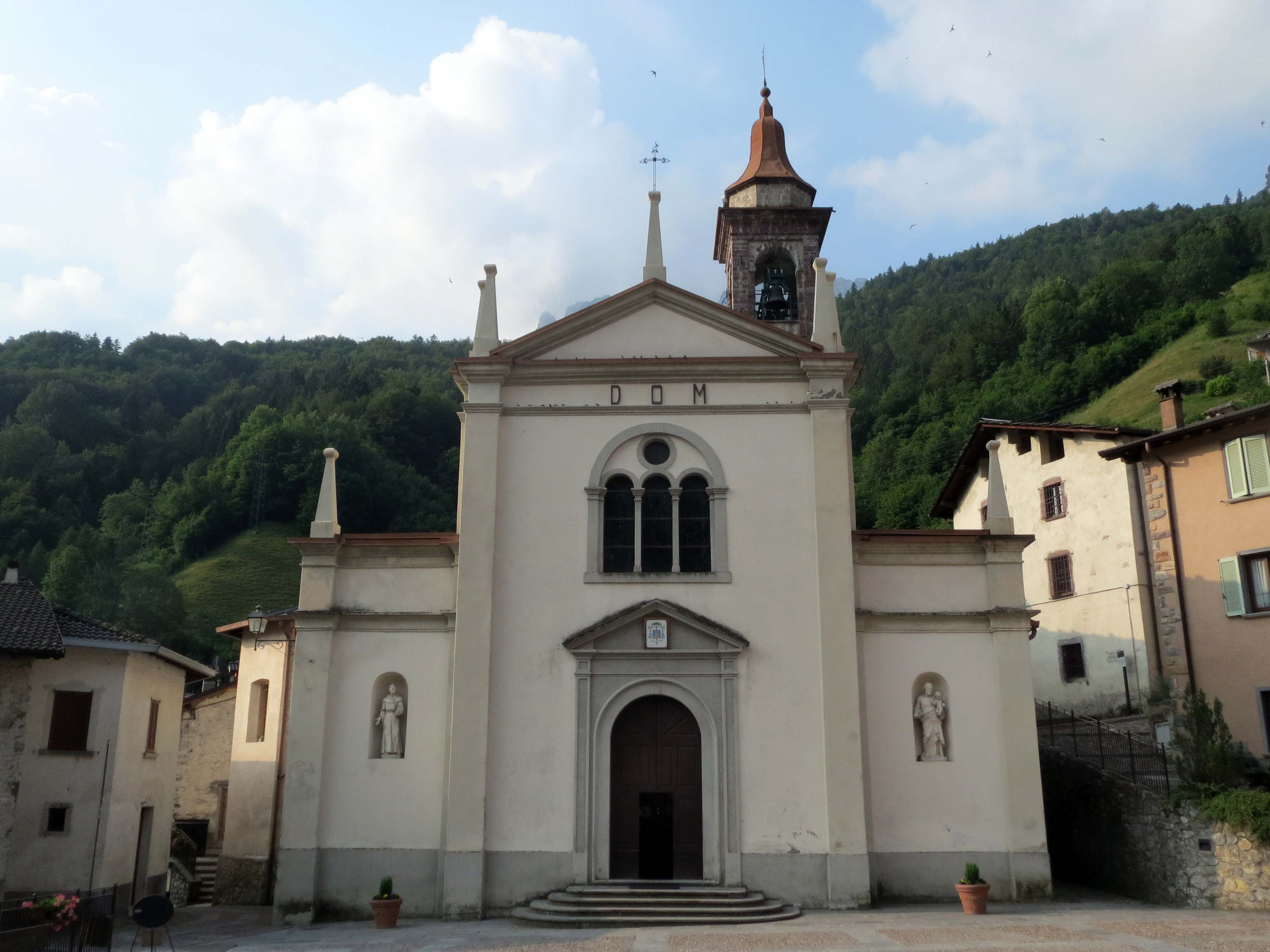
S. Maria Assunta church

Valtorta borders the following municipalities: Barzio, Cassiglio, Gerola Alta, Introbio, Ornica, Vedeseta.

== Ski ==
Valtorta houses the starting point of a cable way that reaches the ski area of Piani di Bobbio. At Ceresole there was also a cross country ski track.
