= Cusio, Lombardy =

Cusio
- Comune
- Comune di Cusio
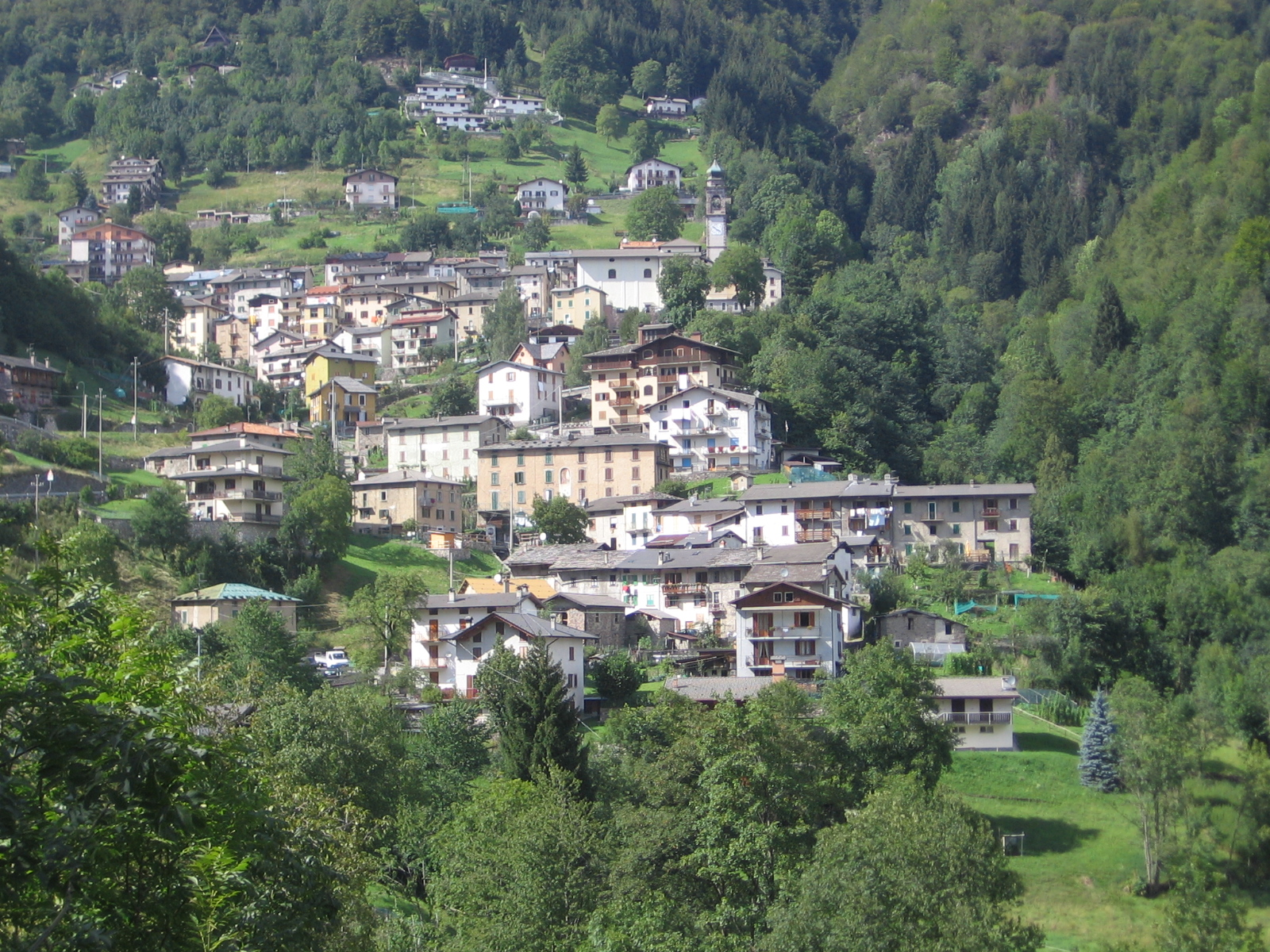
- Cusio

- Location within Italy Location within Lombardy
- Coordinates: 45°59′N 9°36′E
- Country: Italy
- Region: Lombardy
- Province: Province of Bergamo (BG)

Government
  - Mayor: Andrea Paleni

Area
  - Total: 9.3 km^{2} (3.6 sq mi)
- Elevation: 1,050 m (3,440 ft)

Population (Dec. 2004)
  - Total: 286
  - Density: 31/km^{2} (80/sq mi)
- Demonym: Cusiani
- Time zone: UTC+1 (CET)
  - Summer (DST): UTC+2 (CEST)
- Postal code: 24010
- Dialing code: 0345
- Website: Official website

Cusio (Bergamasque: Cüs) is a comune (municipality) in the Province of Bergamo, in the Italian region of Lombardy. It is located about 70 kilometres (43 mi) northeast of Milan, and about 30 kilometres (19 mi) north of Bergamo. As of 31 December 2004, it had a population of 286 and an area of 9.3 square kilometres (3.6 mi^{2}).

Cusio borders the following municipalities: Cassiglio, Gerola Alta, Ornica, Santa Brigida.

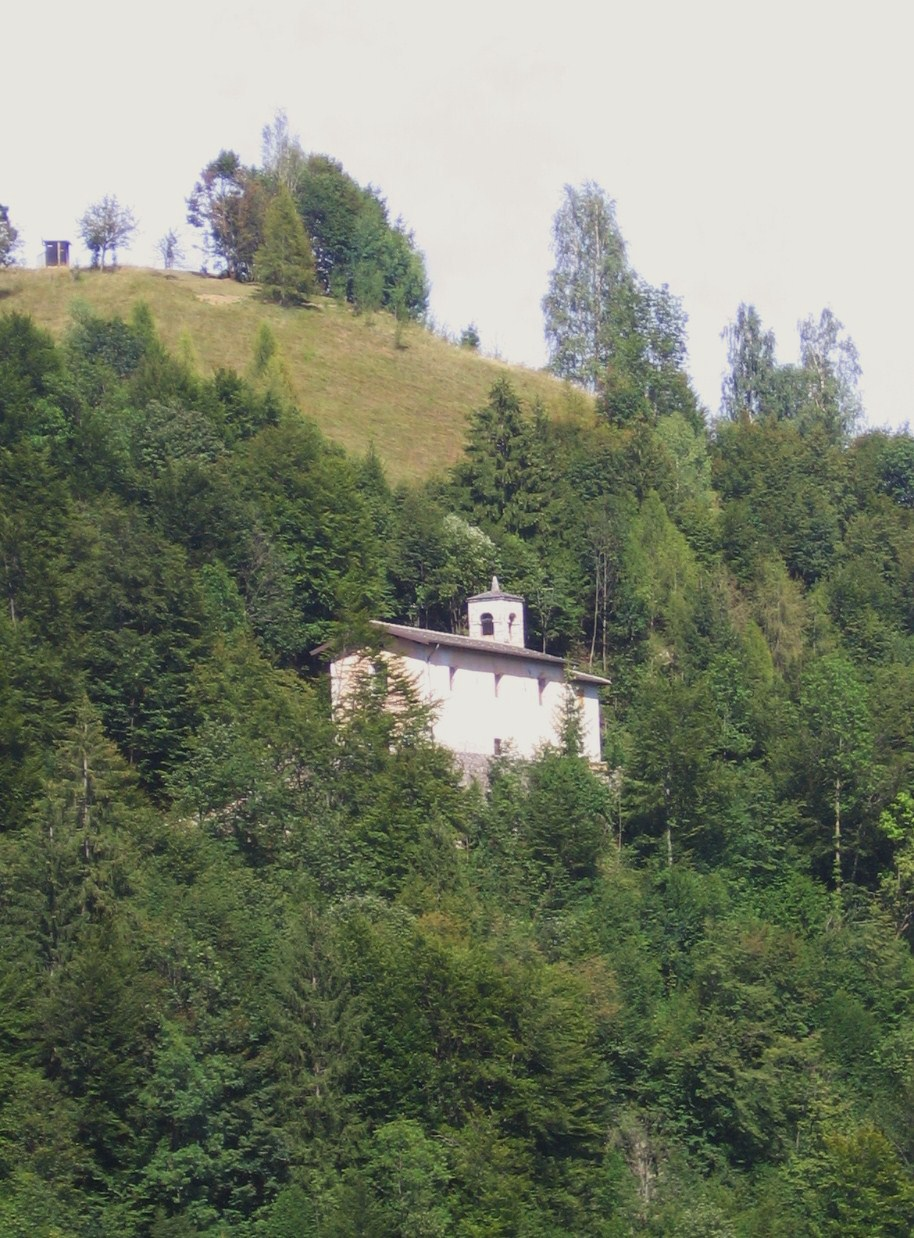
Sant'Alberto church

== Demographic evolution ==
Historical population

Year	Pop.	±%
1861	407	—
1871	417	+2.5%
1881	472	+13.2%
1901	498	+5.5%
1911	589	+18.3%

Year	Pop.	±%
1921	584	−0.8%
1931	516	−11.6%
1936	462	−10.5%
1951	571	+23.6%
1961	491	−14.0%

Year	Pop.	±%
1971	427	−13.0%
1981	414	−3.0%
1991	370	−10.6%
2001	313	−15.4%

Source: Data from ISTAT
