= Scipioni =

Scipioni is an Italian surname. Notable people with the surname include:

- Bruno Scipioni (1934–2019), Italian actor and voice actor
- Jacopino Scipioni (c. 1470–1532), Italian painter
