= Marcello Baschenis =

Italian painter (1829–1888)

- Born: 1829; Genoa, Italy
- Died: 5 December 1888 (aged 58–59); Genoa, Italy
- Occupation: Painter

Marcello Baschenis (1829 – 1888) was an Italian painter.

== Biography ==
=== Early life ===
Marcello Baschenis was born in Genoa, Italy, in 1829, during a significant period of artistic ferment for the city. A longtime student at the Accademia Ligustica di Belle Arti, he was awarded several times between 1864 and 1866, particularly for his specializations in artistic nude studies under Giuseppe Isola, with whom he studied.

=== Career ===
Starting in 1850, he began gaining recognition at the exhibitions of the Società Promotrice di Belle Arti, debuting at the age of twenty-one with a drawing of John the Baptist. He continued to regularly participate in exhibitions from 1851 to 1856 and from 1863 to 1878. Among the works he presented: La pastorella and La vedova sfortunata in 1851, Belisario and Portrait of a Man in 1852, La malinconia, Partenza, and Famiglia savoiarda in 1854.

Until the late 1870s, Baschenis constantly exhibited in the Northern Italian area, focusing particularly on landscape painting and portrait painting, with popular, natural, and religious scenes, as well as numerous genre works. Only a few of these works have survived to this day, among them: La preghiera dei promessi sposi (1871, housed at the Genoa Gallery of Modern Art and previously exhibited in 1871), depicting two young women portraying characters from the opera by Petrella and Ghislanzoni, and The Traveling Knife Grinder (1875, housed at the Gallery of the Provincial Administration of Genoa).

Associated with Romanticism with elements of Verismo, in the second part of his career, he created various ecclesiastical works and ex votos, some of which are now kept at the Shrine of Nostra Signora della Guardia, the Santuario della Madonna del Monte, and the Santuario di Nostra Signora della Vittoria in Mignanego, Italy. At the Church of Sant'Andrea in Foggia, Rapallo, there is an 1876 altarpiece depicting Saint George and Saint Contardo d'Este in Adoration of the Madonna of the Rosary. Additionally, at the Santuario di Nostra Signora Incoronata, there is a pair of 1875 paintings dedicated to the popular legend of Pacciûgo and Pacciûga. Other works are on display in Santa Margherita Ligure, Bogliasco, and Pieve di Teco.

=== Later years and death ===
He died in Genoa on December 5, 1888, at the age of fifty-nine.

== Legacy ==
In May 1926, during the 75th exhibition of the Società per le Belle Arti, he was among the artists included in the exhibition of 19th-century Ligurian painting curated by Mario Labò.

In 1938, as part of the celebrations of the Grandi Liguri, he was among the artists featured in the exhibition on the figures who shaped Ligurian painting during the 19th century, held at Palazzo Rosso under the supervision of Orlando Grosso.

He is among the painters mentioned in the dictionary written by art critic and historian Agostino Mario Comanducci.

== Gallery ==
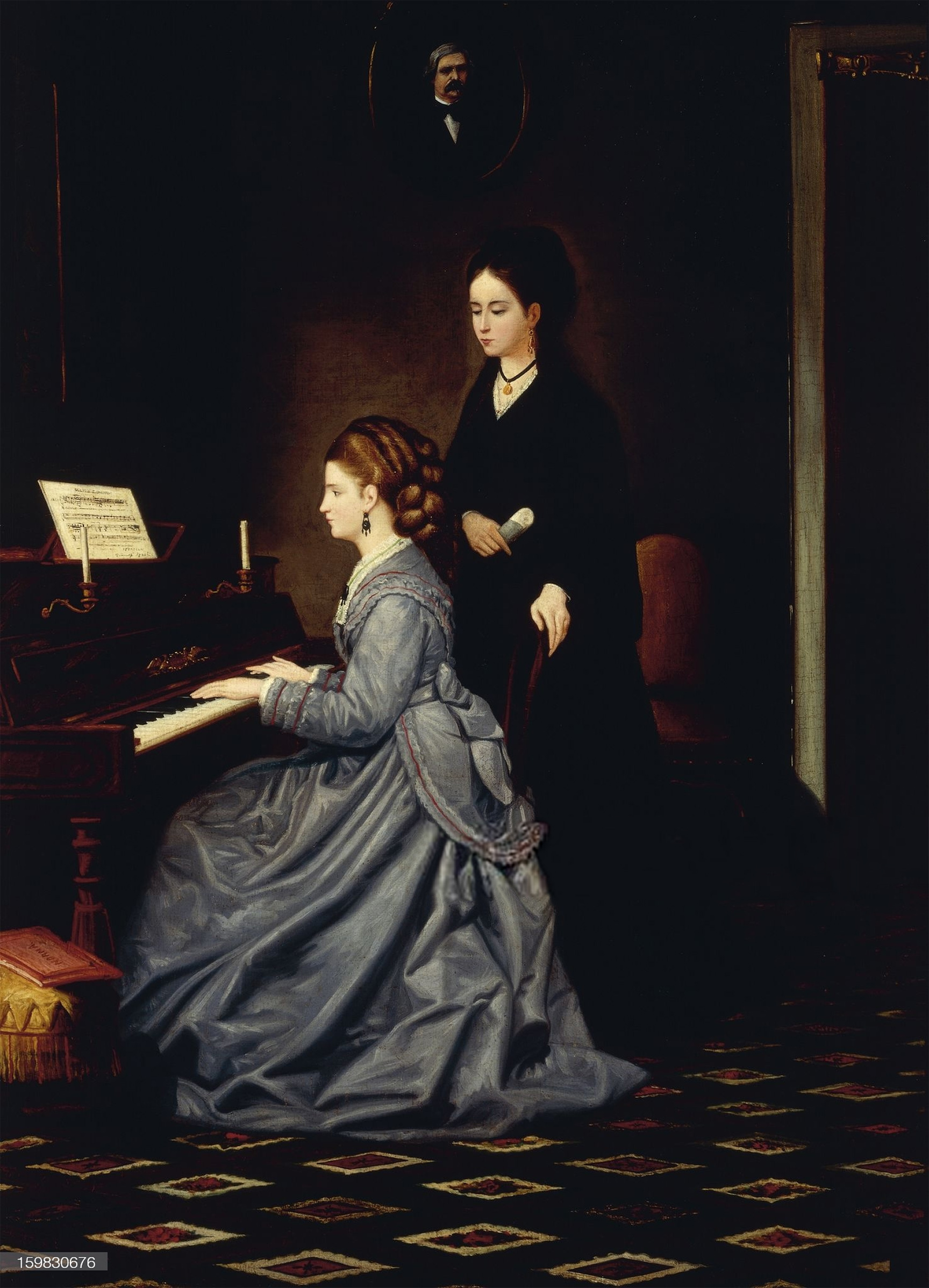
The prayer of the Betrothed, 1871. Genova, Italy, 19th century. Galleria D'Arte Moderna (Art Gallery)

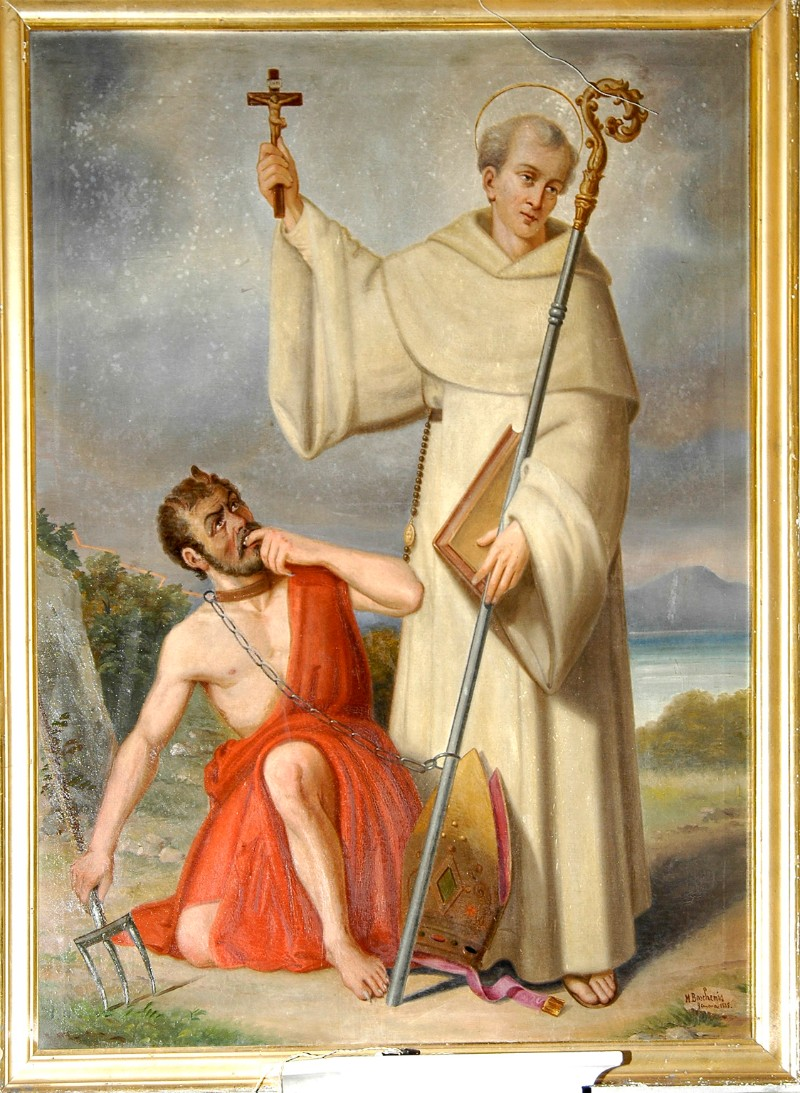
Saint Bernard and Satan, 1885

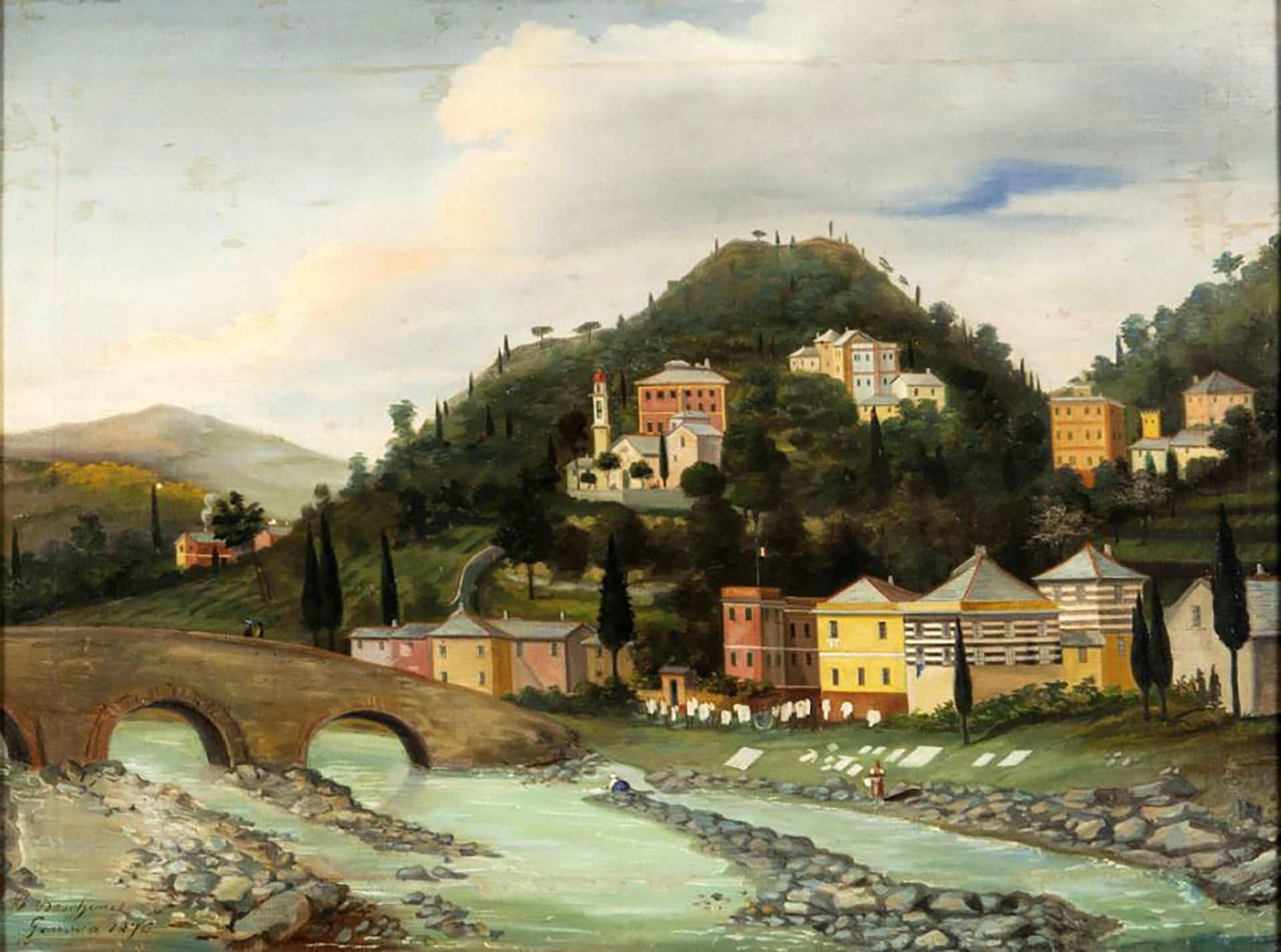
Historical Ponte Carrega, in Genova, Italy, 1870

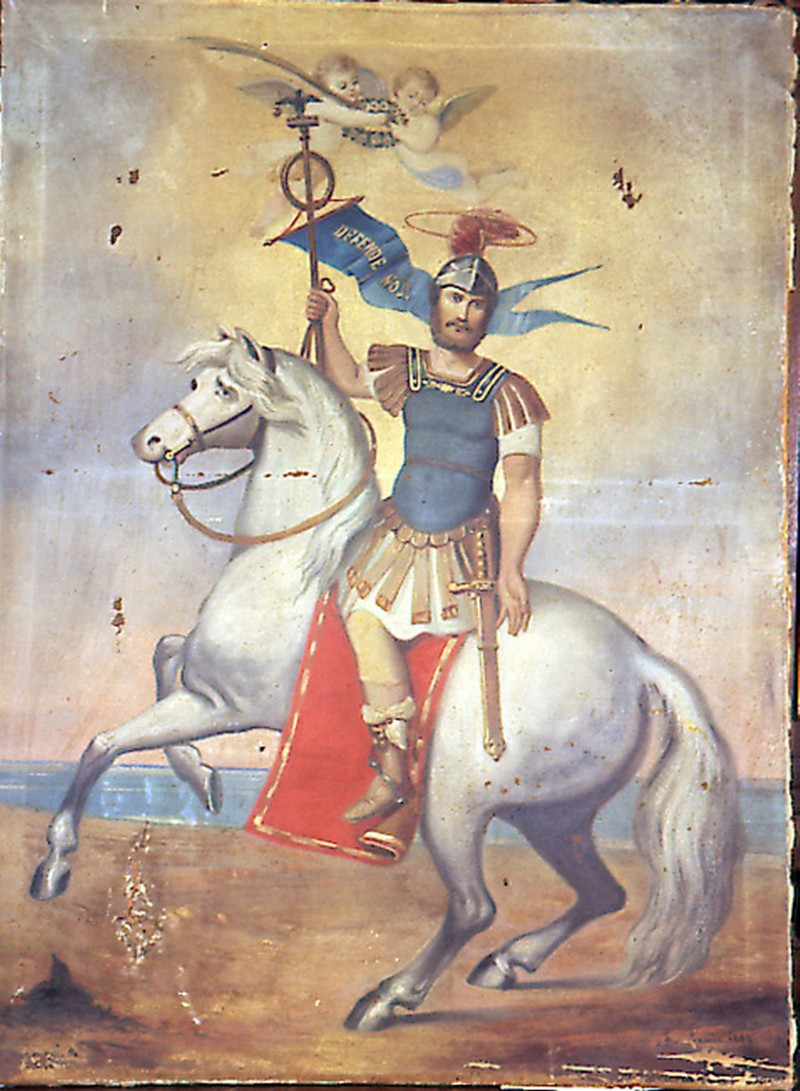
Saint Defendens on horseback, 1884

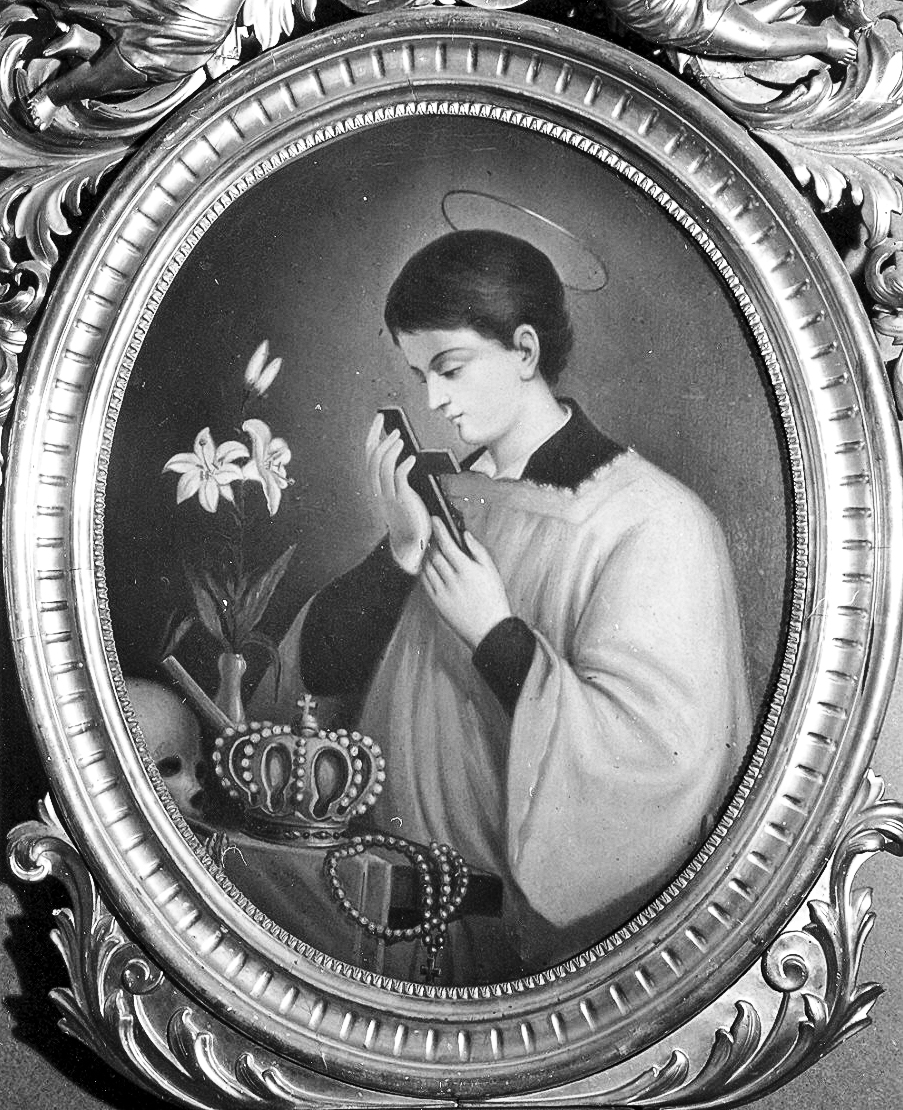
Oil on canvas depicting Saint Aloysius Gonzaga in a Romantic style, featuring canonical iconographic elements

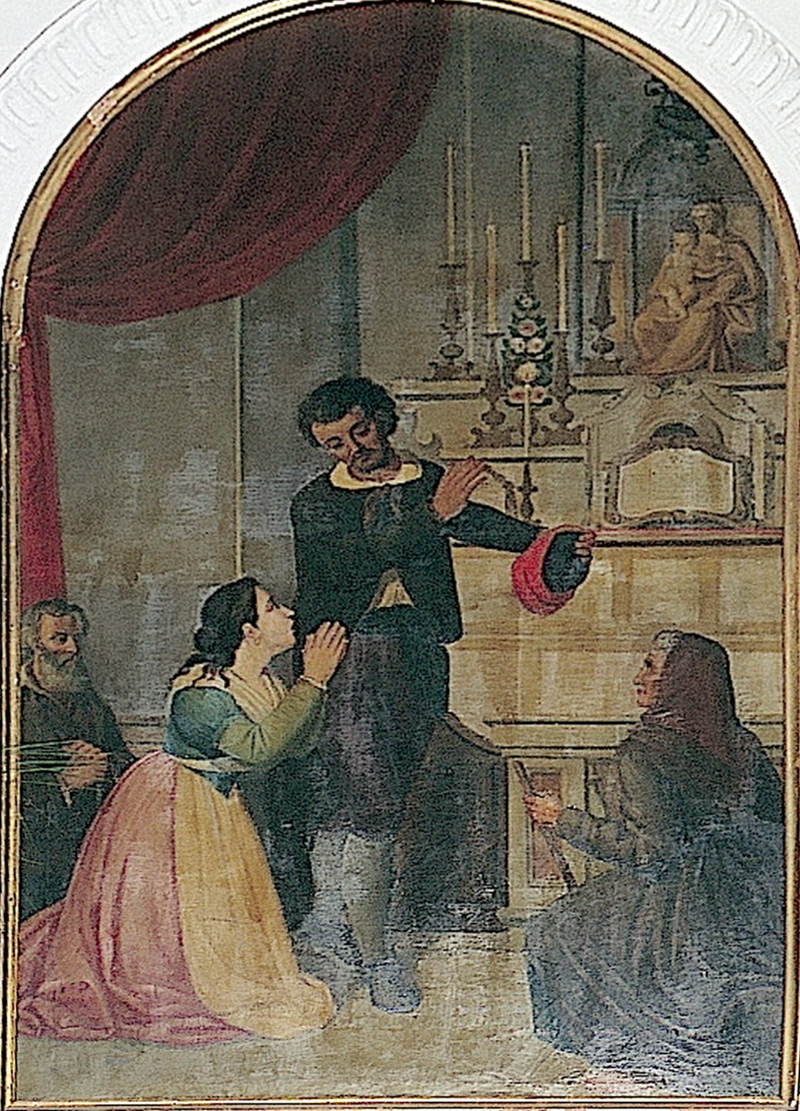
Pacciûgo and Pacciûga, one of the two paintings shown at the Santuario di Nostra Signora Incoronata

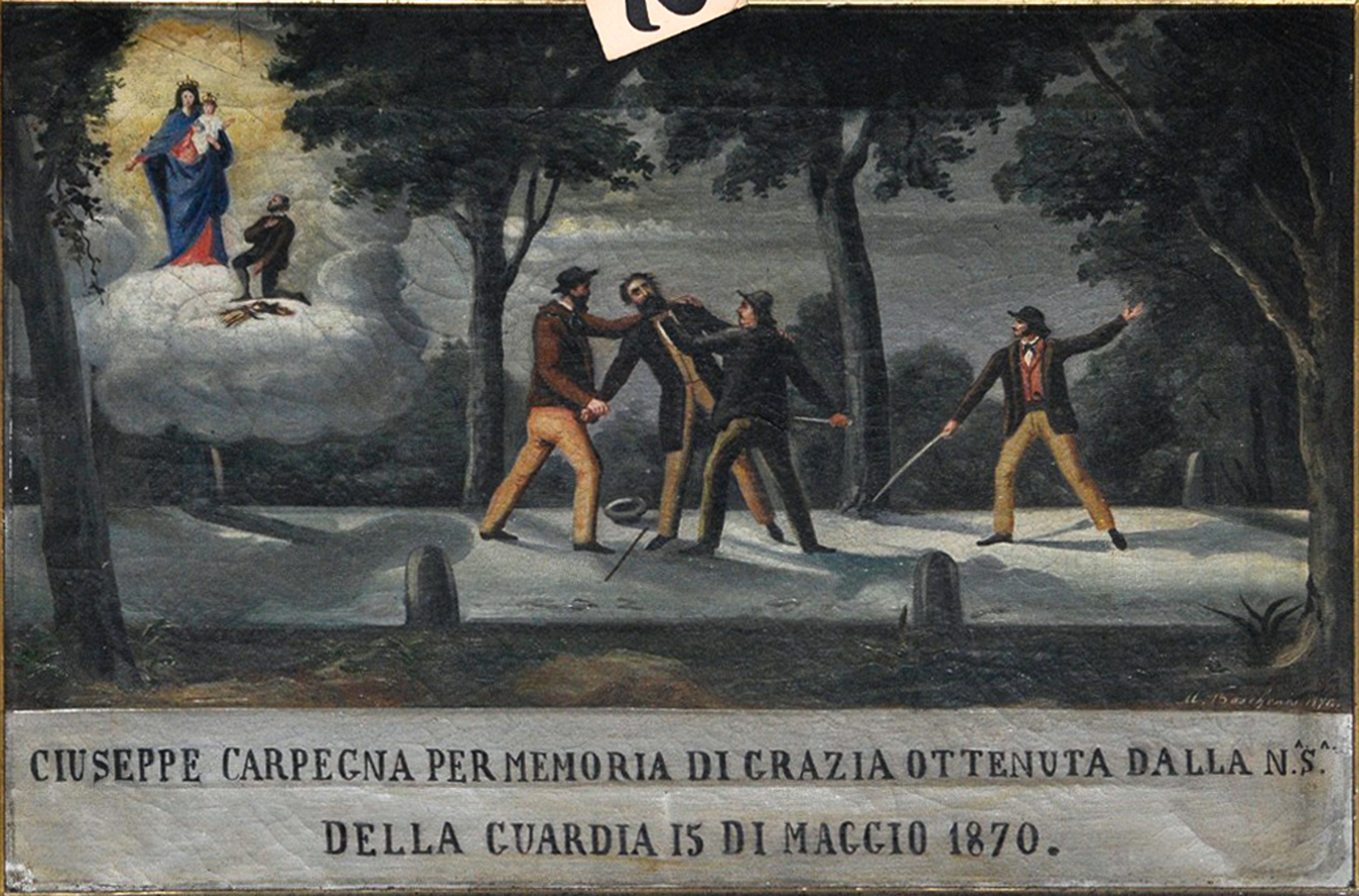
An ex voto painting, thanking for a received grace for surviving an ambush

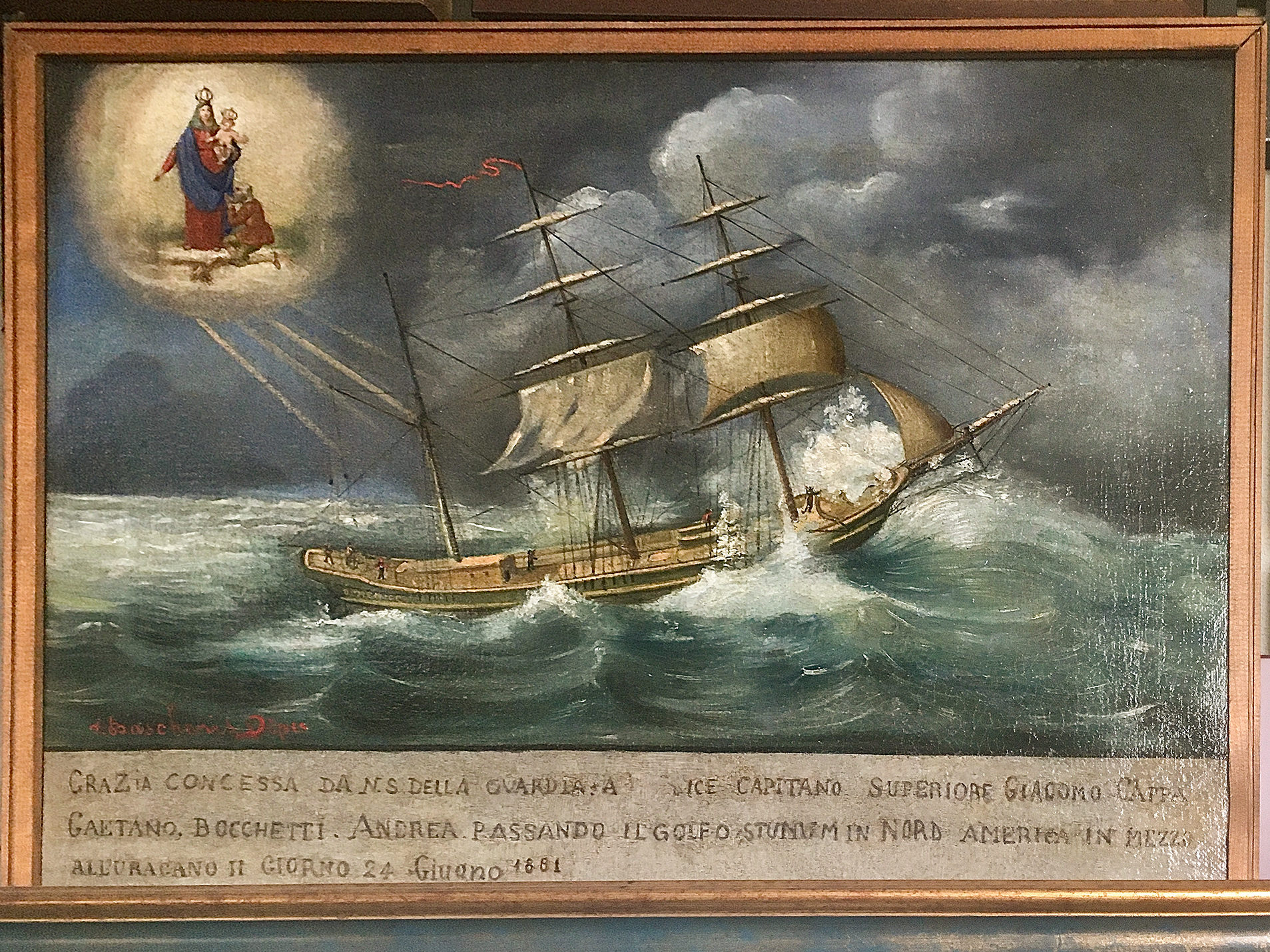
An ex voto painting, about a storm in North America, 1881

== Sources ==
- Giuliano Matteucci, Pittori & pittura dell'Ottocento italiano, De Agostini, 1996-1997
- Agostino Mario Comanducci, Pittori italiani dell'Ottocento, C.E. Artisti d'Italia, 1934
- Agostino Mario Comanducci, Dizionario illustrato dei pittori disegnatori e incisori italiani moderni e contemporanei, Patuzzi editore, 1962
- Giuseppe Costa, Pittori liguri dell'800 e del primo '900, Sagep, 1994. ISBN 9788870585322
- Mario Labò, Mostra di pittura ligure dell'Ottocento, Società per le Belle Arti Genova, 1926
- Scienza e letteratura: passioni e ispirazioni nell'arte del secondo Ottocento, Galleria D'Arte Moderna (Art Gallery), 28 maggio 2017
