= Defendens =

3rd-century Christian martyr

Saint Defendens of Thebes
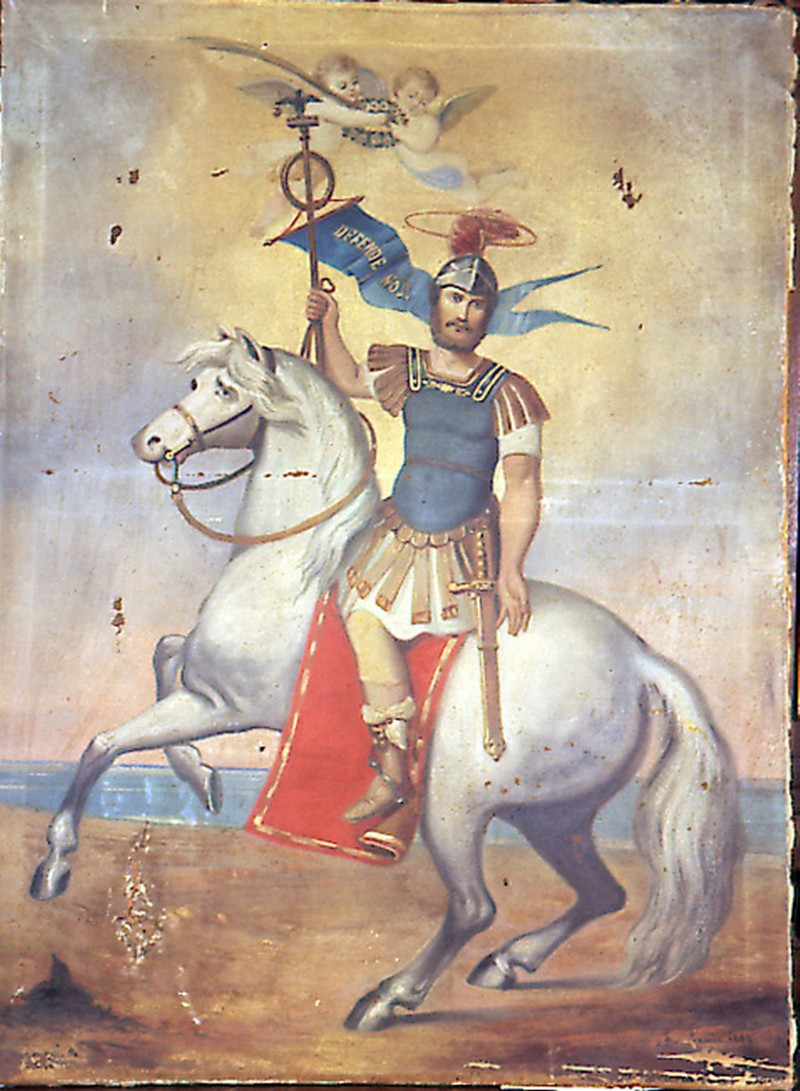
- Image of Saint Defendens, 1885. Oil on canvas, Marcello Baschenis

Martyr
- Born: Africa?
- Died: 286 AD; Agaunum
- Venerated in: Roman Catholic Church
- Feast: January 2
- Attributes: military attire
- Patronage: Romano di Lombardia; invoked against wolves and fires

Defendens of Thebes (Italian: San Defendente di Tebe) is venerated as a martyr by the Catholic Church. Venerated as a soldier-saint, Defendens was, according to Christian tradition, a member of the Theban Legion, and thus martyred at Agaunum.

== Veneration ==
Particular veneration for Defendens was widespread in Northern Italy; evidence for this cult dates from as early as 1328. His feast day was celebrated in the cities of Chivasso, Casale Monferrato, Novara, and Lodi on January 2, and oratories, altars, and confraternities were dedicated to him. He also enjoyed veneration in Marseille; the Catholic Encyclopedia states that “several saints belong in a particular way to Marseille: the soldier St. Victor, martyr under Maximian; the soldier St. Defendens and his companions, martyrs at the same time...” But as Antonio Borrelli writes, some scholars believe that the Defendens venerated in Italy is different from the martyr who was a member of the Theban Legion.

There is an oratory dedicated to him at Solto Collina. There is also a church dedicated to him at Clusone, the church of San Defendente, and another at Invorio.

Until 1476 his relics, according to the 1578 Martyrologium Sanctae Romanae Ecclesiae of Pietro Galesino, were kept in the church of Santa Croce in Casale Monferrato, which suggested that his martyrdom may have taken place in that region.

The painter Defendente Ferrari, born at Chivasso, where Defendens was venerated, carries the baptismal name of this martyr.

== Gallery ==
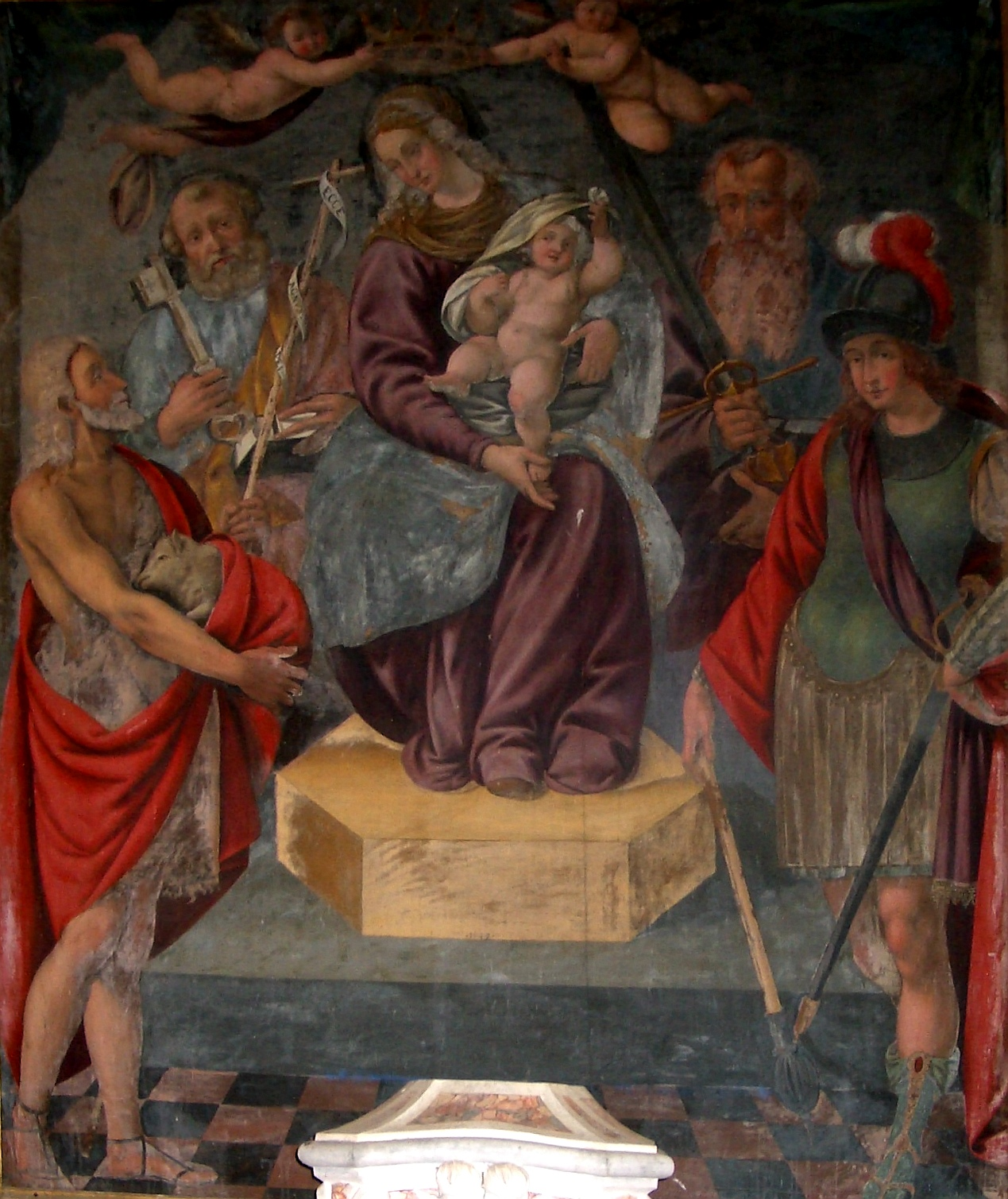
Cristoforo Martinolio, "il Rocca", Madonna Enthroned with the Infant Christ and St Peter, Saint Paul, St John the Baptist, St Defendens (far right).

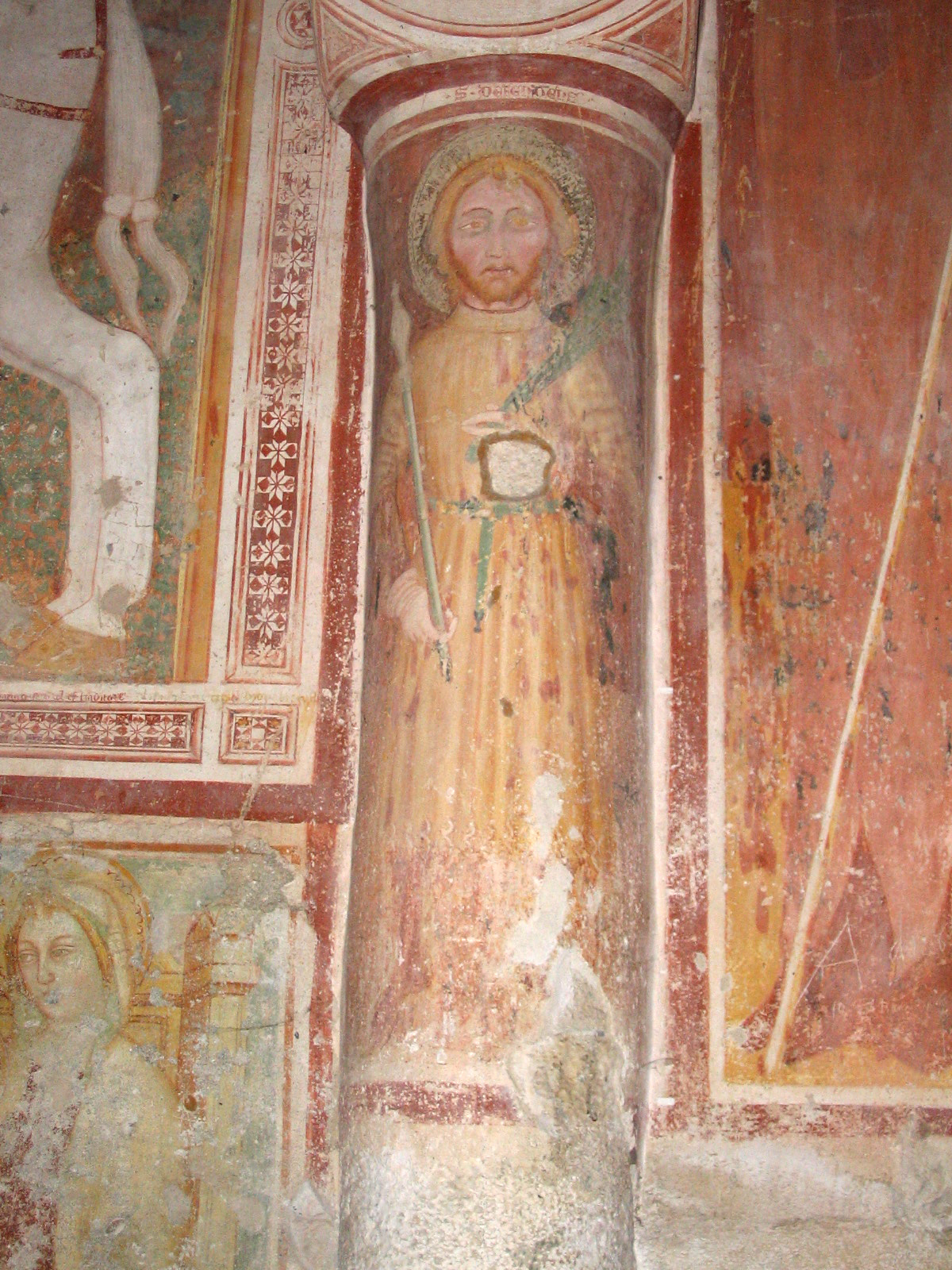
Saint Defendens, attributed to the "Maestro del 1388". Chiesa di San Giorgio in Lemine.

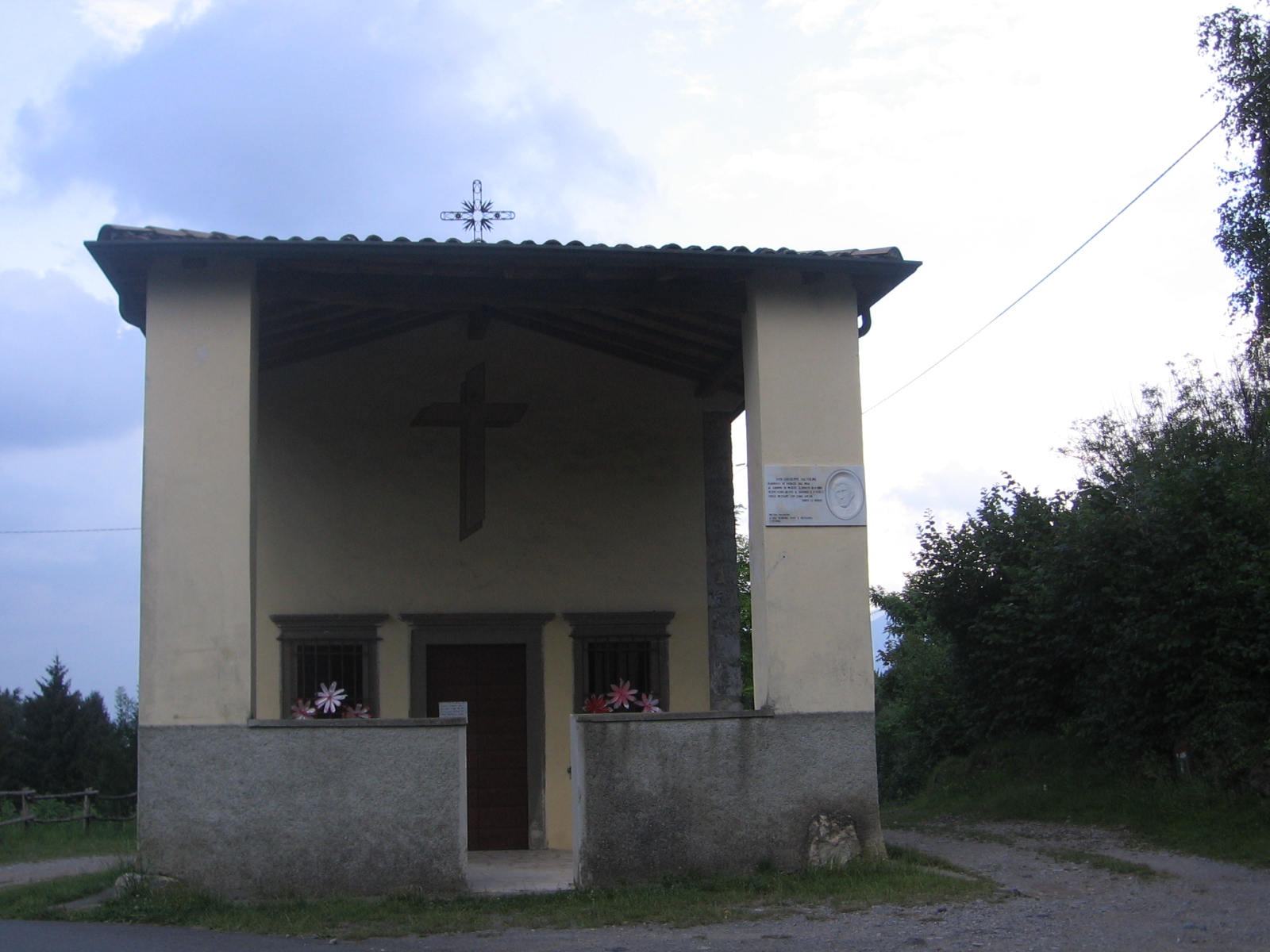
Oratorio di San Defendente, Solto Collina.

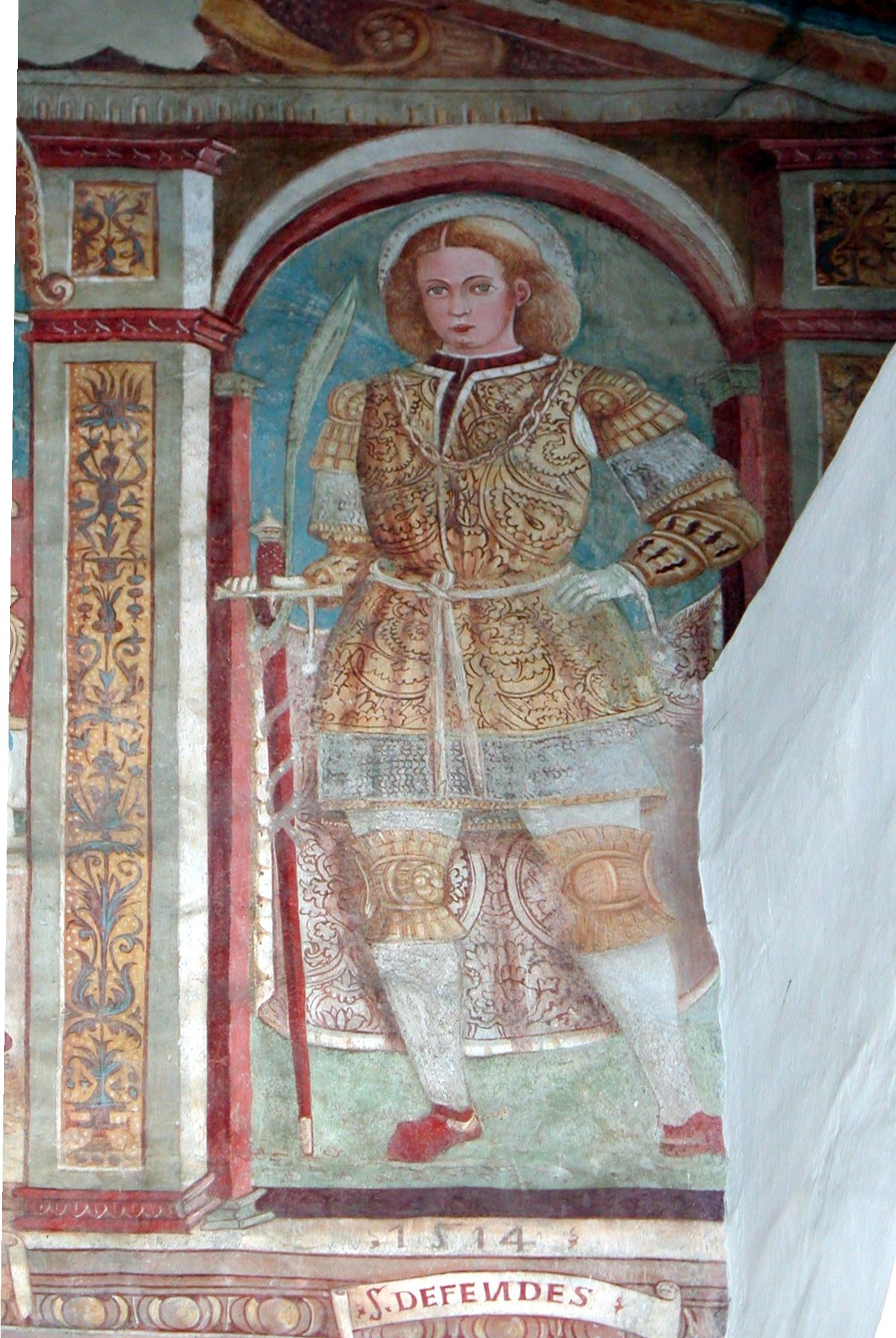
Image of Saint Defendens. Church of San Defendente at Clusone.
