= Ornica =

- Comune
- Comune di Ornica
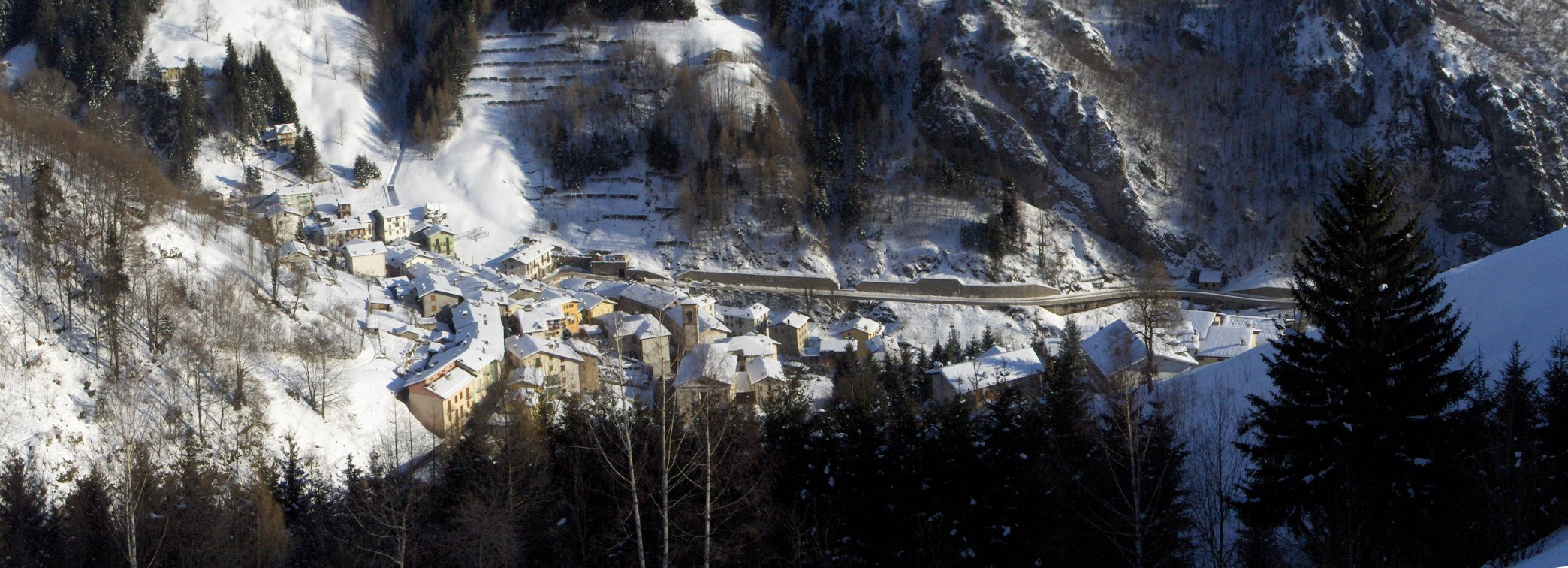

- Coat of arms

- Location within Italy Location within Lombardy
- Coordinates: 45°59′N 9°35′E
- Country: Italy
- Region: Lombardy
- Province: Bergamo (BG)

Government
  - Mayor: Ambrogio Quarteroni

Area
  - Total: 14.3 km^{2} (5.5 sq mi)
- Elevation: 922 m (3,025 ft)

Population (Dec. 2004)
  - Total: 201
  - Density: 14.1/km^{2} (36.4/sq mi)
- Demonym: Ornichesi
- Time zone: UTC+1 (CET)
  - Summer (DST): UTC+2 (CEST)
- Postal code: 24010
- Dialing code: 0345
- Patron saint: St. Ambrose
- Saint day: December 7
- Website: Official website

Ornica (Bergamasque: Örniga) is a comune (municipality) in the Province of Bergamo in the Italian region of Lombardy, located about 70 kilometres (43 mi) northeast of Milan and about 30 kilometres (19 mi) north of Bergamo, at the foot of the Pizzo Tre Signori.

Ornica borders the following municipalities: Cassiglio, Cusio, Gerola Alta, Valtorta.

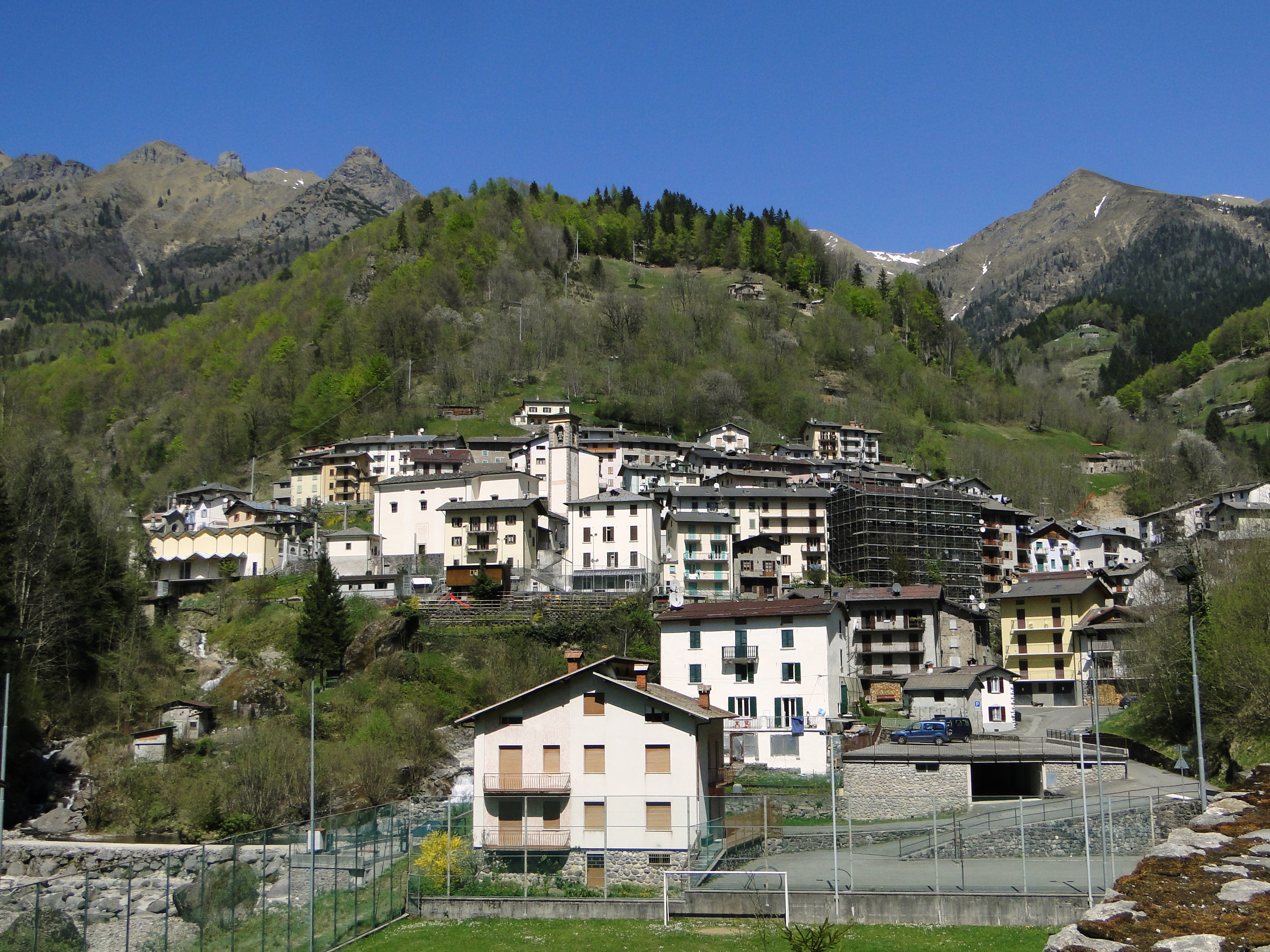
the town

== Demographic evolution ==
Historical population

Year	Pop.	±%
1861	308	—
1871	307	−0.3%
1881	332	+8.1%
1901	339	+2.1%
1911	414	+22.1%

Year	Pop.	±%
1921	384	−7.2%
1931	445	+15.9%
1936	433	−2.7%
1951	530	+22.4%
1961	502	−5.3%

Year	Pop.	±%
1971	487	−3.0%
1981	346	−29.0%
1991	261	−24.6%
2001	210	−19.5%

Source: Data from ISTAT
