= Santa Brigida, Lombardy =

Santa Brigida
- Comune
- Comune di Santa Brigida
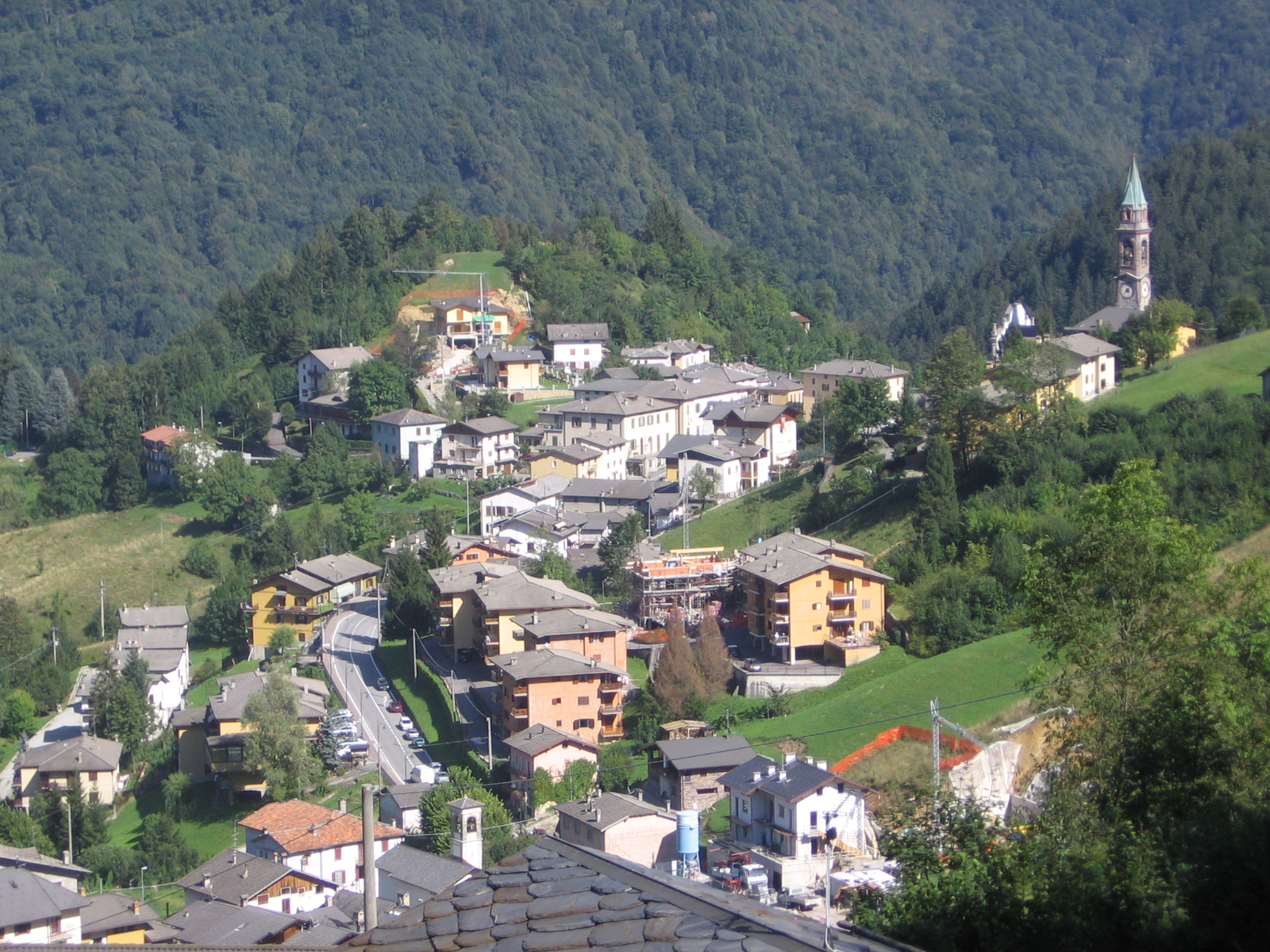
- Santa Brigida

- Location within Italy Location within Lombardy
- Coordinates: 45°59′N 9°37′E
- Country: Italy
- Region: Lombardy
- Province: Province of Bergamo (BG)

Government
  - Mayor: Manuel Rossi

Area
  - Total: 14.2 km^{2} (5.5 sq mi)
- Elevation: 805 m (2,641 ft)

Population (Dec. 2004)
  - Total: 623
  - Density: 43.9/km^{2} (114/sq mi)
- Demonym: Sambrigedesi
- Time zone: UTC+1 (CET)
  - Summer (DST): UTC+2 (CEST)
- Postal code: 24010
- Dialing code: 0345

Santa Brigida is a comune (municipality) in the Province of Bergamo in the Italian region of Lombardy, located about 70 kilometres (43 mi) northeast of Milan and about 30 kilometres (19 mi) north of Bergamo. As of 31 December 2004, it had a population of 623 and an area of 14.2 square kilometres (5.5 mi^{2}).

Santa Brigida borders the following municipalities: Averara, Cassiglio, Cusio, Gerola Alta, Olmo al Brembo.

== Demographic evolution ==
Historical population

Year	Pop.	±%
1861	635	—
1871	684	+7.7%
1881	711	+3.9%
1901	876	+23.2%
1911	1,012	+15.5%

Year	Pop.	±%
1921	1,078	+6.5%
1931	865	−19.8%
1936	751	−13.2%
1951	930	+23.8%
1961	804	−13.5%

Year	Pop.	±%
1971	788	−2.0%
1981	694	−11.9%
1991	646	−6.9%
2001	635	−1.7%

Source: Data from ISTAT
