= Spirano =

- Comune
- Comune di Spirano
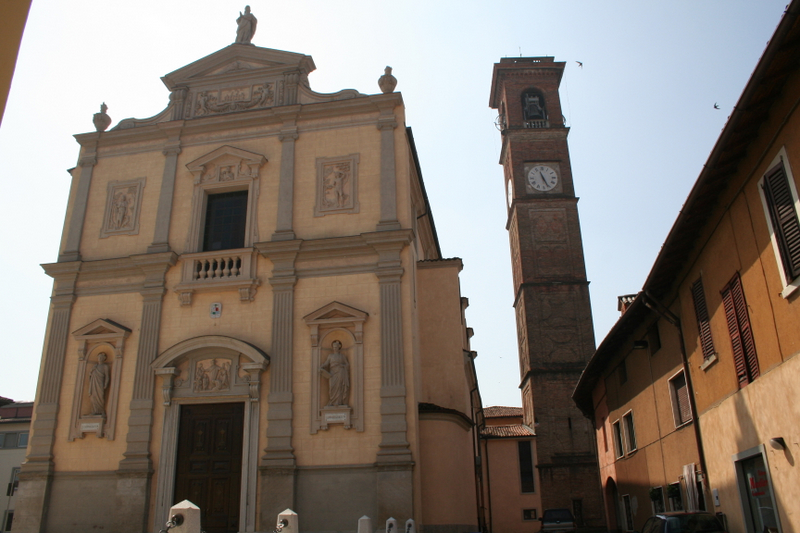
- Church

- Location within Italy Location within Lombardy
- Coordinates: 45°35′N 9°40′E
- Country: Italy
- Region: Lombardy
- Province: Bergamo (BG)

Government
  - Mayor: Yuri Grasselli

Area
  - Total: 9.61 km^{2} (3.71 sq mi)
- Elevation: 154 m (505 ft)

Population (31 May 2021)
  - Total: 5,643
  - Density: 587/km^{2} (1,520/sq mi)
- Demonym: Spiranesi
- Time zone: UTC+1 (CET)
  - Summer (DST): UTC+2 (CEST)
- Postal code: 24050
- Dialing code: 035
- Website: Official website

Spirano (Bergamasque: Spirà) is a comune (municipality) in the Province of Bergamo in the Italian region of Lombardy, located about 40 kilometres (25 mi) northeast of Milan and about 13 kilometres (8 mi) south of Bergamo.

Spirano borders the following municipalities: Brignano Gera d'Adda, Cologno al Serio, Comun Nuovo, Lurano, Pognano, Urgnano, Verdello.

== History ==
The first inhabitants of the area were some Ligurian tribes which were succeeded by the Cenoman Gauls.

With the Roman domination, the country assumed a well-defined physiognomy which had on its territory a stable military camp that exploited the strategic position of the village, located at the intersection of two important streets. The main one connected Milan to Aquileia, and characterized the commercial life of the area, which benefited from it. However, a few centuries later the same road became the habitual route for the barbarian hordes from North-Eastern Europe, bringing destruction and terror among the local inhabitants.

The Lombard domination guaranteed a new tranquility and prosperity, which continued with the Franks and the Holy Roman Empire. The latter established feudalism, putting the municipal territories under the bishop's control.

During Middle Ages, Spirano was at the center of fratricidal disputes between Guelphs and Ghibellines with clashes that led to tragic results, as in 1312 when the village was plundered and devastated.

A castle was built during the XIII century, that characterized the life of the village for a long time; it had defensive functions and it was the residence of the Suardi family, who managed the fate of the town for several years. Subsequently, they were abolished in favour of the Visconti of Milan, until the whole area passed to the Republic of Venice in 1428.

The Serenissima carried out numerous interventions aimed at improving social and working conditions, tilling land and building irrigation canals. Among these, there was the Bergamasque ditch, mainly used to establish definitively the territorial boundaries of the land state of Venice with the Duchy of Milan. This also touched the territory of Spirano, delimiting it to the South.

Since then, the town has maintained a strong rural connotation and tradition, with agriculture and livestock farming predominanting. However, in these years, the country, which was located near the border with the territories of Milan, had to suffer raids of neighbors, intending to take back these territories. Some quiet time occurred with the advent of the Austrian domination which was replaced by the Kingdom of Italy in 1859.

During the XX century, the country has seen a significant demographic growth, and also a substantial change in working life: agriculture was replaced by industry and the tertiary sector, relegating work in the fields to a minority.

=== Asperianum ===
According to some sources, Asperianum was the ancient name of the settlement, and it probably indicated a harsh, disastrous, inaccessible place, or rather from the town of the Asperij. The name Asperianum is also reported on the ancient coat of arms of the town represented as carved in stone.

The term could be of Celtic origin, in fact it has some characteristics in common with many names with Celtic form in the ac ending that in ancient times preceded most of the names ending with anum.

The first documented attestation of the ancient name of Spirano, dates back to July 1033 and is a deed of sale. In this document, the territory is called Asperiano. In March 1395, on the other hand, in a document concerning the definition of a portion of the border with some neighboring countries, the name Spirano appears.

== Monuments and place of interest ==
=== Church of Saints Gervasio and Protasio ===
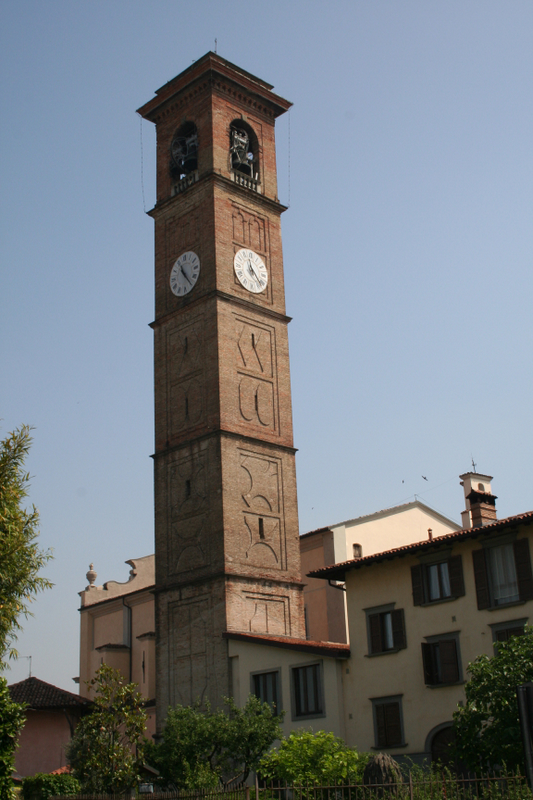
The bell tower

The most important religious building is the parish church of San Gervasio and Protasio, of which we have news from the 13th century.

The church is listed in the document drawn up in 1260 which indicated the churches in the Bergamo area that owed a census to the Holy See, and was included in the parish of Ghisalba. A further mention dates back to 1291 where it is mentioned as rector of Vassallo Raviccia. It is then re-proposed in the note ecclesiarum document commissioned by Bernabò Visconti in 1360 as an indication of the income and taxes imposed on churches. Moreover, it was inserted in the territory subjected to the parish of Ghisalba.

The church was rebuilt in the 15th century. From the report of the pastoral visit of St. Charles Borromeo in 1575 we learn that the parish of Spirano included 676 faithful. The new parish church was built in the 17th century indeed the first stone was placed on 21 April 1605 and was definitively finished in 1633. The church was then consecrated on 3 September 1667 and as a reminder of the event a black stone plaque that read: "DOM AC SS. MART. GERVASIO E PROTASIO TUTELIS SUIS AUGUSTUM HOC TEMPLUM OPPIDANI EXTRUXERUNT DANIEL GIUSTINIANUS EP.US BERG. ET CO. SOLEMNI SACRAVIT RITU P.ma DOMINICA SEPTEMBRIS ANNO MDCLXVII QUI DIES ANNIVERSARIA CELEBRITATE RECOLETUR" .

On 9 February 1776 the bishop Marco Molin elevated the church to a provost. Since 1734 the existence of a vicariate headed by the church of Spirano is attested. At the beginning of the nineteenth century the faithful of Spirano were 1460, rising to 1976 in 1861. The new high altar was consecrated in 1954 by the bishop Giuseppe Piazzi. In 1971 the parish of Spirano passed to the pastoral area XVII, only to be aggregated in 1979 to the new vicariate of Spirano-Verdello.

The characterizing elements of the interior of this church are certainly the altars: the high altar, the altar of the Madonna del Patrocinio, the altar of San Sebastiano, the altar of Sant'Anna and the altar of the Addolorata. Another fundamental element of this church is the organ which with the passage of time was replaced and renovated several times.

The bell tower of the church was considered unsafe for several centuries until the beginning of the renovations, that was completed in 1681.

On the occasion of the reconstruction of the entire arrangement of the bells in 1772, a new and more robust wooden structure was built to support the complex of bells. Eleven years later the concert was recast and a new element was added.

In 1845 other restoration works began on the wooden structure in support of the concert as it was ruined and unsafe but the problem was not solved, in fact, the precariousness of the structure reappeared and the building had to be rebuilt from scratch. The structure of the bell tower received its final layout in the second half of the 19th century.

=== I Morti dell'Arca ===
The rural chapel of the Morti dell'Arca is located on the border between Spirano and Cologno al Serio, near the Fontanili del Consacolo, and dates back to the first half of the 19th century.

The popular tradition has developed a legend around this small church and it tells of a stone ark that was used as a burial in ancient times. After a period of neglect, the ark was found by a farmer who took it to his home with the intention of using it as a drinking trough for his animals. However, the ark mysteriously returned to its place of origin. The farmer tried unsuccessfully several times to take the ark with him.

The country chapel was therefore built in memory of this remarkable event.

=== Country church of San Rocco ===
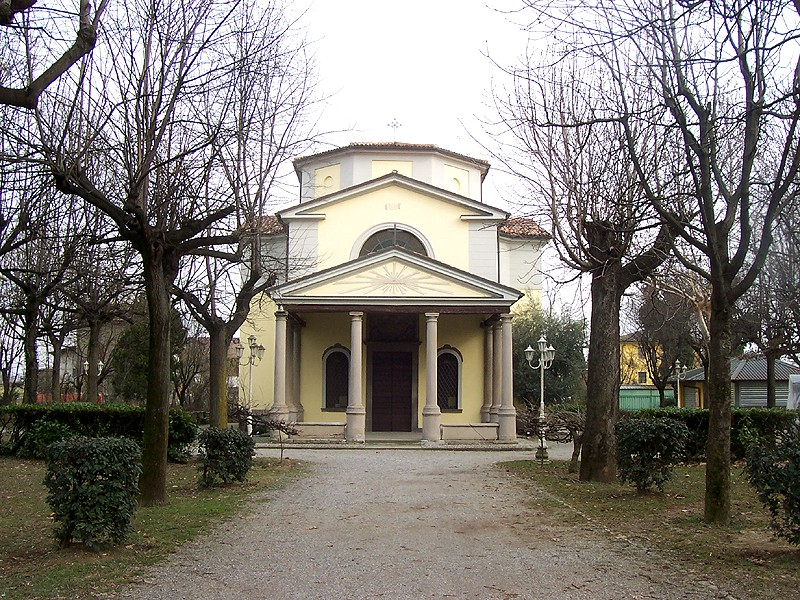
Church of San Rocco

The church was built after the plague that hit the citizens of the town, whose victims were buried in the area where the church currently stands.

The first evidence of the church dates back to 1646 following the pastoral visit of Bishop Grimani, in which he stated that the church should remained closed for the whole year except during the saint's feast, in which it was possible to celebrate the mass inside the building. The church was visited again in 1659 by the bishop of Bergamo Barbarigo who found it without any parameters; idea shared also by Bishop Giustiniani in 1667.

The first plan of the building was in the shape of a T and the main altar was located in the center of the transept perpendicular to the main nave. On the altar there was an altarpiece depicting the Virgin Mary, San Rocco and San Sebastiano dating back to the 1930s; otherwise the church was bare, except for a small organ. In 1794 a bell was placed inside the bell tower bearing the image of San Rocco, San Sebastiano, a crucifixion and the date A.D. 1794.

At the end of the 1800s a new epidemic, smallpox, struck the area and the church of San Rocco was reduced to a hospital.

In 1839, the church was restored. In 1855 the reconstruction works began but before 1858 they were suspended for some time until it was completed in 1867. The new church was built in the form of a Greek cross with two altars: a main altar and a side altar devoted to St. Joseph. In the first papers of the new church, the portico and the double sloping roof are not represented, probably because they were built later.

The land on which the church was built, was owned by the Municipality of Spirano since the 1930s. However, during a council meeting on May 31, 1864, it was approved the free transfer of the building to the Parish Church of Spirano.

Currently the church is surrounded by a large equipped recreational area and by the San Rocco fountain immersed in wooded strips; it is also a destination for pilgrimages.

=== Campo Santo ===
In some papers of 1500, it is reported the presence of a place near the church destined for the burial of corpses. Several dead bodies were buried in this area until the early 1800s, a period in which, following the Napoleonic edict of Saint-Cloud of 12 June 1804, the construction of the Campo Santo was arranged outside the town. Consequently, the names old cemetery and new cemetery were applied in order to distinguish them.

The new Campo Santo was built along the road leading to Cologno al Serio. On 29 October 1809, it was blessed by the parish priest Angelo Allegreni delegated by the bishop Paolo Dolfin and the first body was buried a few months later.

In the beginning, the cemetery was simply a fairly bare and fenced piece of land; only a year after its opening, the first noble funeral chapel was built, that of the Adelasio family.

Since its opening, all the corpses have been buried in the new cemetery (except for rare exceptions concerning clergymen); for this reason, in 1842 it was enlarged for the first time.

=== The historic center ===
The historic center of Spirano is enclosed within the ring road that marks the areas where the defensive moat once stood. Some evidence of the fortifications can be found around the town. In Piazza Ere, for example, emerges a quadrangular tower assembled with pebbles which belonged to the defensive system built between the 13th and 14th centuries and which comprises other more complex structures including the Civic Center. In the latter, it is possible to observe the ancient well and an oven, located along the south side of the structure that hosted the old municipal library.

The Civic Center borders on another important structure, the Stallazzo, which is composed of a courtyard surrounded by structures that once housed the stables and residences of the settlers of the MIA (Misericordia Maggiore di Bergamo) while it is currently used as a residential building public.

The oldest structures in the Stallazzo dates back to the 14th century. In the 17th century it reached its current size but after a fire in the 19th century, the structure was rearranged and the spaces were reorganized. The Stallazzo was then completely renovated in 2003, becoming the seat of public housing.

=== Church of the Madonna del Carmine ===
Before taking its current name, in 1813, the church of the Madonna del Carmine was known as the cemetery chapel of San Fermo and San Pantaleone. From 1813, the building was limited to keep the best possible conditions, however, in 1868 the state of conservation of the church became worrying; for this reason, the restoration work began the same year.

After about ten years of neglect, in 1988 the work for the rehabilitation and restoration of the external part of the building began, which ended the following year.

== Municipal Administration ==
Spirano Administration
From	To	Mayor	Party	Role
1995	1999	Pietro Zanotti	Civic List	Mayor
1999	2004	Emilio Nozza Bielli	Civic List	Mayor
2004	2009	Gabriella Previtali	Civic List	Mayor
2009	2014	Giovanni Francesco Malanchini	Lega Nord	Mayor
2014	2019	Giovanni Francesco Malanchini	Lega Nord	Mayor
2019	ongoing	Yuri Grasselli	Lega Nord	Mayor

== Bibliography ==
• Marco Carminati, Il circondario di Treviglio e i suoi comuni, Treviglio 1892.

• Natale Maffioli, Spirano: due millenni tra storia ed arte, Graffio snc, 2007.

• Barbara Oggionni, Pianura da scoprire: guida ai 24 comuni dello IAT di Treviglio e territorio, Treviglio, Clessidra, 2005.
