= Ciserano =

- Comune
- Comune di Ciserano
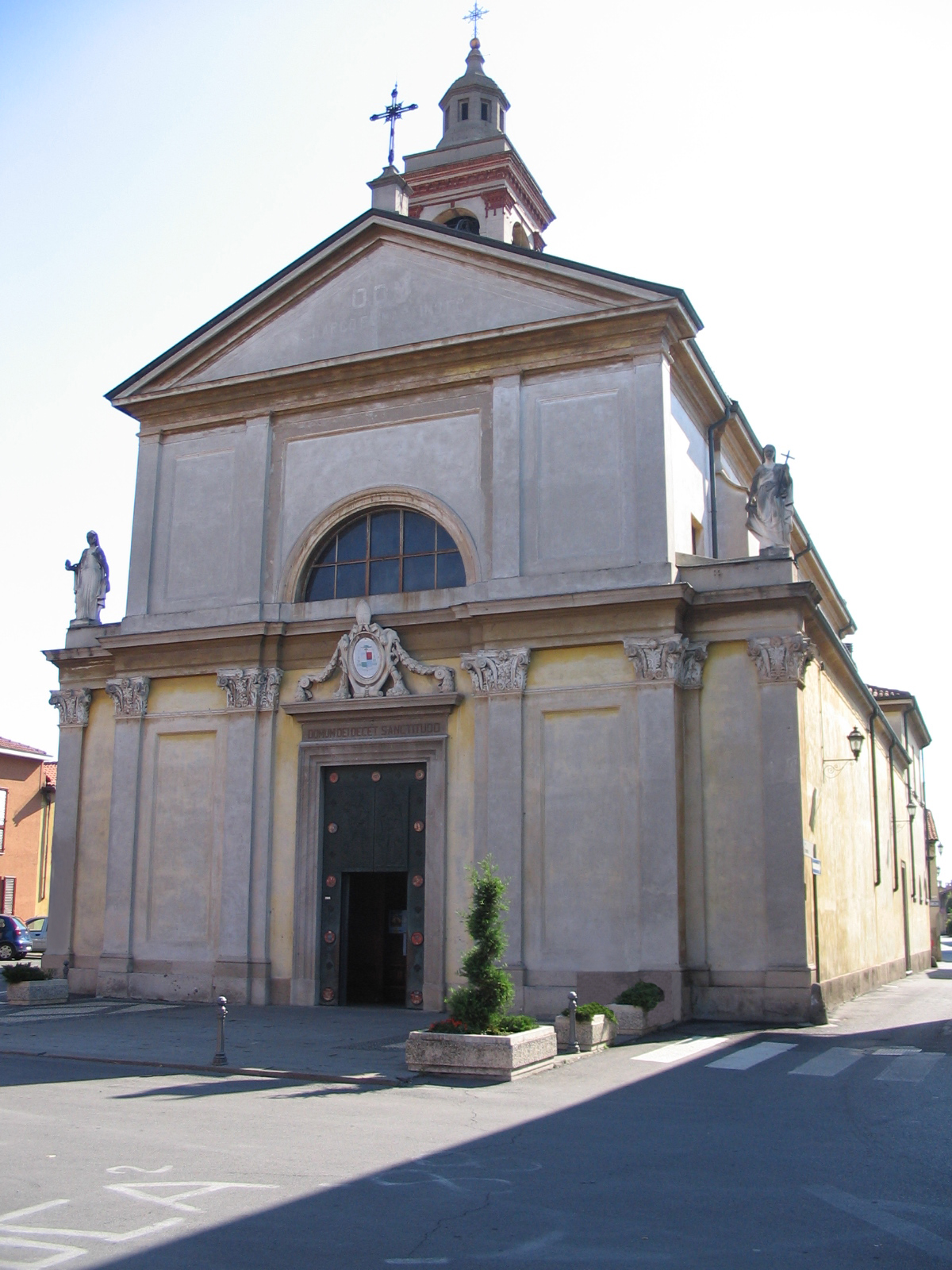
- Church

- Coat of arms

- Location within Italy Location within Lombardy
- Coordinates: 45°35′N 9°36′E
- Country: Italy
- Region: Lombardy
- Province: Province of Bergamo (BG)

Government
  - Mayor: Caterina Vitali

Area
  - Total: 5.2 km^{2} (2.0 sq mi)
- Elevation: 159 m (522 ft)

Population (Dec. 2004)
  - Total: 5,270
  - Density: 1,000/km^{2} (2,600/sq mi)
- Demonym: Ciseranesi
- Time zone: UTC+1 (CET)
  - Summer (DST): UTC+2 (CEST)
- Postal code: 24040
- Dialing code: 035
- Website: Official website

Ciserano (Bergamasque: Siserà) is a comune (municipality) in the Province of Bergamo in the Italian region of Lombardy, located about 35 kilometres (22 mi) northeast of Milan and about 14 kilometres (9 mi) southwest of Bergamo. As of 31 December 2004, it had a population of 5,270 and an area of 5.2 square kilometres (2.0 mi^{2}).

Ciserano borders the following municipalities: Arcene, Boltiere, Pontirolo Nuovo, Verdellino, Verdello.

== Demographic evolution ==
Historical population

Year	Pop.	±%
1861	1,343	—
1871	1,328	−1.1%
1881	1,400	+5.4%
1901	1,490	+6.4%
1911	1,679	+12.7%

Year	Pop.	±%
1921	1,834	+9.2%
1931	1,939	+5.7%
1936	1,887	−2.7%
1951	2,228	+18.1%
1961	2,608	+17.1%

Year	Pop.	±%
1971	3,573	+37.0%
1981	4,222	+18.2%
1991	4,392	+4.0%
2001	4,925	+12.1%

Source: Data from ISTAT

== Sports ==
U.S. Ciserano is the Italian football of the city and was founded in 1951. Currently it plays in Italy's Serie D after the promotion from Eccellenza

Its home ground is Stadio Giacinto Facchetti of Cologno al Serio. The team's colors are red and blue.
