= Pognano =

- Comune
- Comune di Pognano
- San Carlo Borromeo Church

- Location within Italy Location within Lombardy
- Coordinates: 45°35′N 9°38′E
- Country: Italy
- Region: Lombardy
- Province: Province of Bergamo (BG)

Area
  - Total: 3.2 km^{2} (1.2 sq mi)
- Elevation: 157 m (515 ft)

Population (Dec. 2004)
  - Total: 1,374
  - Density: 430/km^{2} (1,100/sq mi)
- Demonym: Pognanesi
- Time zone: UTC+1 (CET)
  - Summer (DST): UTC+2 (CEST)
- Postal code: 24040
- Dialing code: 035

Pognano (Bergamasque: Pognà) is a comune (municipality) in the Province of Bergamo in the Italian region of Lombardy, located about 40 kilometres (25 mi) northeast of Milan and about 13 kilometres (8 mi) south of Bergamo. As of 31 December 2004, it had a population of 1,374 and an area of 3.2 square kilometres (1.2 mi^{2}).

Pognano borders the following municipalities: Arcene, Lurano, Spirano, Verdello.

== Demographic evolution ==
Historical population

Year	Pop.	±%
1861	563	—
1871	608	+8.0%
1881	620	+2.0%
1901	625	+0.8%
1911	688	+10.1%

Year	Pop.	±%
1921	713	+3.6%
1931	733	+2.8%
1936	734	+0.1%
1951	801	+9.1%
1961	808	+0.9%

Year	Pop.	±%
1971	919	+13.7%
1981	1,115	+21.3%
1991	1,156	+3.7%
2001	1,241	+7.4%

Source: Data from ISTAT
