= Cologno al Serio =

- Comune
- Comune di Cologno al Serio
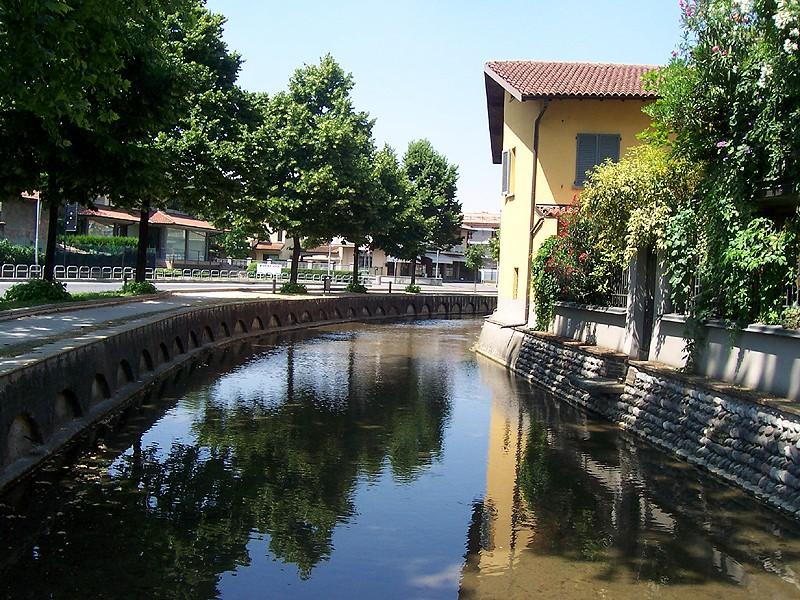
- The moat

- Location within Italy Location within Lombardy
- Coordinates: 45°35′N 9°42′E
- Country: Italy
- Region: Lombardy
- Province: Bergamo (BG)

Government
  - Mayor: Chiara Drago

Area
  - Total: 18.52 km^{2} (7.15 sq mi)
- Elevation: 156 m (512 ft)

Population (28 February 2017)
  - Total: 11,145
  - Density: 601.8/km^{2} (1,559/sq mi)
- Demonym: Colognesi
- Time zone: UTC+1 (CET)
  - Summer (DST): UTC+2 (CEST)
- Postal code: 24055
- Dialing code: 035
- Patron saint: Saint Eurosia
- Saint day: October 11
- Website: Official website

Cologno al Serio (Bergamasque: Cològn söl Sère) is a comune (municipality) in the Province of Bergamo within the Italian region of Lombardy, located about 45 kilometres (28 mi) northeast of Milan and about 10 kilometres (6 mi) south of Bergamo.

Cologno al Serio borders the following municipalities: Brignano Gera d'Adda, Ghisalba, Martinengo, Morengo, Romano di Lombardia, Spirano, Urgnano.

== History ==
=== Antiquity ===
The first human settlements in the area date back to about four thousand years ago, in the Bronze Age, as evidenced by the discovery of skeletons and tools: these make Cologno al Serio one of the oldest archaeological sites in the province of Bergamo.

Later eras saw first the arrival of some Ligurian tribes, and later the Cenoman Gauls, from whom the Romans took over.

The new rulers gave the first urban organization to the village, which began to take on increasing importance: studies on the topic have been greatly helped by findings concerning skeletons, funeral kits, vases and coins of the time of Vespasian.

There was also a military road that, also used for commercial transport, passed from Cologno al Serio connecting Bergamo with Piacenza, thus increasing the possibilities of exchange of the inhabitants.

Also, the toponym originates in this historical period and would find an explanation in Colonius, owner and inhabitant of these lands. Other hypotheses, however, would like to derive the name of the village from the term Colonus, given the agricultural vocation of the village already in the past.

=== Middle Ages ===
During the sixth century the arrival of the Longobards occurred, of which has reached another important find, always found on the municipal territory of Cologno, consisting of a clay table (now kept in the Archeological Museum of Bergamo) engraved with the name of six inhabitants of the time. However, the first written document in which the name of the town is mentioned dates back to 843, when such Stephanus de Colonias is mentioned in an act.

In these years the town grew in importance thanks to the presence of an ancient Roman road, renamed "Francesca road", restores by the Franks, from which it took the name. This was also used to transport the body of Louis II of Italy, son of Lothair I, from Brescia to Milan.

The subsequent development of feudalism, favoured by the emperors of the Holy Roman Empire, marked a new era for the village of Cologno al Serio. Initially assigned to Otto III to Ulrich, he later saw a period of deep political and social instability, caused by the bloody clashes between Guelphs and Ghibellines. It was during this period that the town began to acquire numerous fortifications, including a castle with a moat, designed to defend the territory that, at the centre of the aims of the contenders, was plundered at the end of the twelfth century by Frederick Barbarossa and twice by the Milanese.

It was because in the country the Guelph side was becoming increasingly consistent, which began to provide hospitality to members of the same faction fleeing from other centres. The number grew to the point of allowing Cologno to be considered one of the largest centres of the Guelph faction. These, with the help of the comrades of other cities, including Brescia and Cremona, managed to get the better of their opponents and to appropriate the castle.

The subsequent beginning of the lordship of the Visconti did not calm the clashes, which not only continued to disturb the life of the town but also grew due to the construction of another castle, in Liteggio, managed by the Lanzi family.

=== The Republic of Venice ===
The situation ended with the beginning of the Republic of Venice in 1428. Thanks to its social and cultural policy, the population was able to live a more peaceful life. Through the Peace of Ferrara of 1428, in fact, Cologno al Serio was assigned to the Republic of Venice. The government of the Serenissima certified this annexation with a document written in Latin dated 11 July, known as the "acceptance of dedication". On July 13, Venice confirmed the statutes and regulations of the municipality: from that moment on, on the fortress of Cologno, began to wave the flag of San Marco.

The peace with Ferrara, however, did not last long; in the following years, in fact, Cologno was at the centre of infighting among numerous "condottieri di ventura". One of the most famous was Bartolomeo Colleoni from Bergamo, a native of Solza. Thanks to his military capabilities, he succeeded, during the years and through countless factional changes, to be appointed by the Venetian Republic captain general. Following this appointment, which took place on 10 March 1455, he was assigned as a residence the castle of Malpaga; Colleoni was also recognized as a personal field of the territories of Romano, Martinengo, Urgnano and Cologno.

With the Peace of Lodi of 9 April 1454 Cologno al Serio was recognized as an important Venetian outpost, given its strategic geographical position; the border between Venice and the Duchy of Milan, ran along the moat that divided the town from Brignano. Along this moat, then, were built the small barracks for the deployment of the soldiers on guard, being Cologno home to the Venetian corps of permanent guard consists of 16 soldiers. Some "boundary stones" were placed along this border: to the west to indicate the territories of the state of Milan, while to the east to indicate those of the state of Veneto. On November 13, 1454, the representatives of Cologno were called to swear allegiance to the Venetian Republic.

At the dead of Bartolomeo Colleoni, on 15 December 1475, the Republic of Venice established that the territories of its feud with fortifications, including Cologno, returned full dominion of Venice. Although the Venetian Republic had asked to become independent from the outpost of Bergamo and to be subjected directly to Venice, the Venetian Republic did not accept the request. Cologno was in fact the only fortified town able to protect Bergamo to the south. For this reason, on 7 August 1484, the Captain of Bergamo sent his representative to Cologno and take possession of it, leaving the lieutenant Bergando Viti.

In the following years, Cologno, as a border town, was the centre of clashes disputes inherent in the Lombard territory; suffered sieges, experienced countless political changes as well as the invasions of French, Spanish, German and Milanese troops. This situation of political, military and social chaos will last for centuries, until the seventeenth century.

=== Seventeenth and eighteenth centuries ===
From the seventeenth century a new phase began for the municipality of Cologno al Serio. While the previous centuries were characterized by a succession of conflicts, from the beginnings of the seventeenth century there was a period of relative serenity for the citizens of Cologno, which will last until the end of the seventeenth century.

However, this peace was disturbed in 1630 by the pandemic of the bubonic plague, which, brought by the Milanese Lanzichenecchi soldiers, also spread in the territory of Bergamo. In May 30 deaths in Cologno were recorded. The spread of the disease led to the opening of a Lazaretto in the locality known as Campino.

=== Modern and contemporary ages ===
The end of the Venetian occupation occurred in 1797 with the advent of the Cispadana Republic and, subsequently, from the constitution of the Cisalpine Republic.

In March 1797, in fact, Bergamo and its provinces met under the Cispadane Republic for the will of the French domination, which had managed to penetrate the Italian territory even if this created numerous discontent and failed attempts of the rebellion. The monuments that recalled the Venetian domination were demolished throughout the territory of Bergamo, the same happened in Cologno. After few months, however, Napoleon Bonaparte on 30 June 1797 declared the end of the Cispadane republic and its territories of Bergamo came under the dominion of Milan, capital of the new Cisalpine Republic. In 1789 Bergamo and its provinces were named "Department of the Serio" which was divided into twenty-three districts, which were later reduced to seventeen. Cologno al Serio was contested by the neighbouring territories because of its geographical position: initially part of the fourteen district with Verdello, then passed to the fifteenth district, having the nearby town of Romano di Lombardia as capital. The Cisalpine Republic, as well as the Cispadane Republic, had a short life and fell apart in 1799.

In 1815, the Austrians who established the Kingdom of Lombardy-Veneto and Milan, as well as its subordinate territories, passed into their hands. Bergamo was once again divided into eighteen districts and Cologno was made a subordinate to Verdello, becoming a municipality of the thirteenth district (based on an organizational system that was based on the owners). Cologno, in this case, was declared a second-class municipality and was placed under the administration of a deputation chosen by the assembly of the owners themselves who, in turn, chose a referent who would become mayor of the place, thanks to ratification of imperial appointment.

The last significant historical change related to the history of the municipality occurred in 1859 when Cologno al Serio, together with the rest of the province of Bergamo, became part of the Kingdom of Italy.

In the twentieth century, Cologno was involved in the historical events of this turbulent century, including the First and Second World Wars. Many youngs of Cologno took part in the conflict. The First World War losses of the inhabitants of Cologno amounted to seventy-two deaths, while those of the Second World War amounted to thirty-six. In particular, fifteen of these died directly at the front, in a concentration camp in Germany, two during the siege of German soldiers and seventeen dispersed at the sea or in Russia.

== Monuments and place of interest ==
=== Civil architecture ===
The historic centre of Cologno al Serio has great importance, having maintained the original structure that the village-owned in medieval times. Still intact and visible are in fact the city walls with its moat that protected the entrance of the village. To reach the town centre of Cologno four well-preserved entrances have been built and in one of them is located the municipal seat. Even the houses and roads inside the fortification have maintained their peculiarities.

==== The defensive walls, the moat and the four gates ====
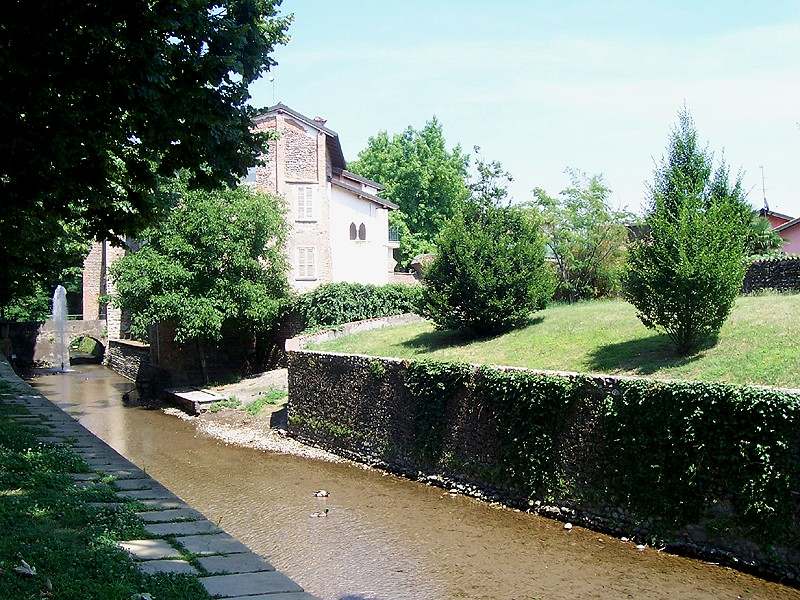
Glimpse of the moat, near Porta Rocca.

During the rule of the Republic of Venice the walls, the moat and the four gates were consolidated and improving becoming a strategic defence against the invasions of enemy populations. The first trace of a primordial defence system of the town dates back to the year 1293. Following the conquest of the country by the Republic of Venice, the same imposed on the town the edification of the walls. Six towers were also built with bridges and secondary drawgates. Among these, the fortress located to the north was the most fortified, being originally equipped with thicker walls and two side towers to be used as base posts for the allocation of sentinels. Here there were also two drawbridges: one outside and one inside. The castle could hold about one hundred soldiers and was also equipped with a small prison.

The moat was about ten metres wide and much deeper than it appears, having been filled as considered dangerous. In the past, moreover, there was also a second parallel outer belt, which was an additional defence element. This secondary enclosure was then demolished at the beginning of the nineteenth century to make space for small vegetable gardens and the construction of additional buildings.

Although the walls, the moat and the gates have been modified several times over the centuries, the traces of the original medieval buildings are still visible. Along the walls, there are also four gates positioned at the cardinal points. However, it is believed that at least three of these were made before the actual construction of the walls, nineteenth-century parchments (conserved in the Library of Angelo Mai in Bergamo), in fact, mention the "porta de Casatico" (in 1239), the "Contrada de Merenghello" (in 1279) and the "Porta de Anteniano" (in 1288). The four are called:

- Porta Antiniano, which rises in the direction of Brescia and whose name comes from the ancient village Antiniano. It is the door that has undergone fewer changes over the years. Its original structure is of the medieval age. The name of this gate derives from the fundus or vico Antinianum, a small inhabited district of Roman times. Access to the door is made accessible through a staircase that connects the door directly to the moat.
- Porta Rocca, the fortification to the north towards Bergamo and seat of the municipality of Cologno al Serio. The name derives from a fort erected at the end of the thirteenth century along the outer perimeter, of which it is an integral part. Only the lower part of the tower has maintained its original character, while the upper part has been rebuilt over the years. These architectural changes are due to the continuous and repeated damage caused by numerous war events that have marked the history of Cologno. This door also has a coat of arms depicting the Moioli family, who in the seventeenth century owned the castle donated to him by the community of Cologno al Serio in recognition of their contribution to the defence of the town.
- Porta Moringello, built to the west in direction of Treviglio and Milan, whose name derives from the municipality of Morengo. In ancient times, the inhabitants of Morengo directed to Bergamo passed through this door lengthening their journey; this was because the main road was particularly insidious. Among the four doors of Cologno, Porta Moringhello is the least preserved, although the architecture shows clear signs of its original construction. For example, traces of the presence of two metal shatters allowing entry and exit from the town centre can still be seen, as well as the typical medieval quadrangular structure.
- Porta Cassadega, facing south towards Crema and Piacenza. Its name derived from a canal called "Casatica" that stood in the village of Spirano and ended in Cologno, near the mentioned gate. Its construction was carried out through the use of different materials, including stone mixed with river pebbles and solid terracotta. There are still traces of grooves in which beams were placed, then walled with a different material than that of the original structure. Near the door there is a building whose facade houses a painting characterized by baroque decorative elements of Santa Liberata; this building was also the house where Major General Luigi Agliardi died in 1931.
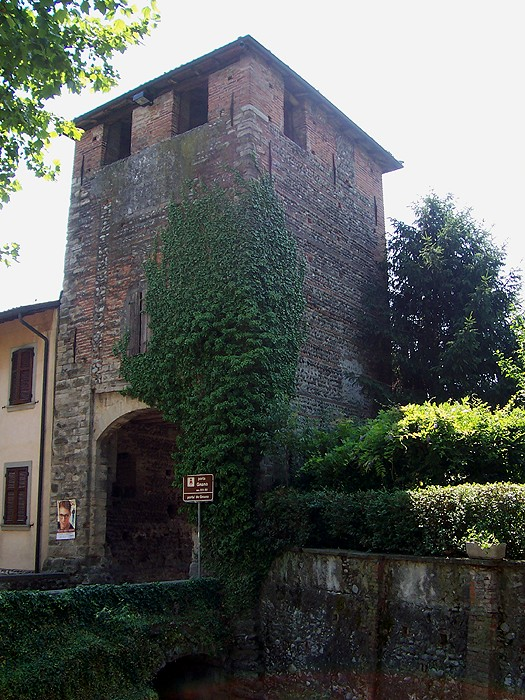
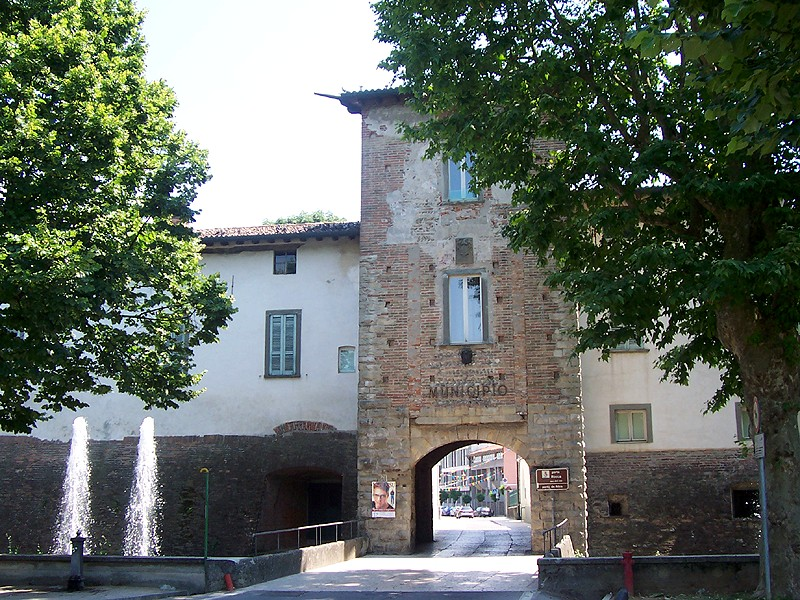
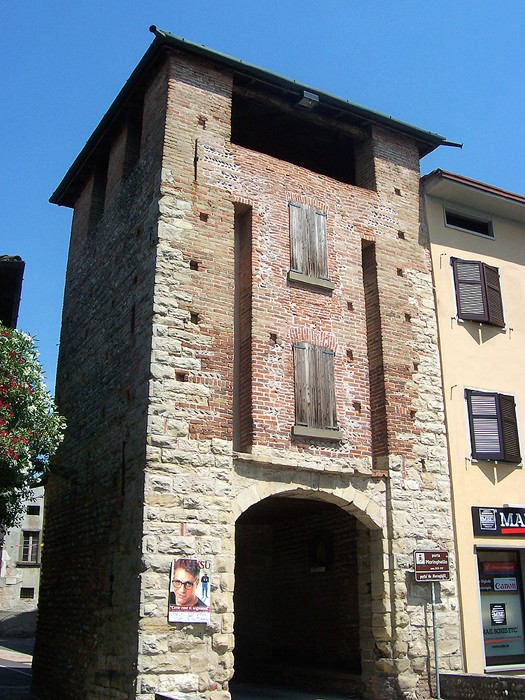
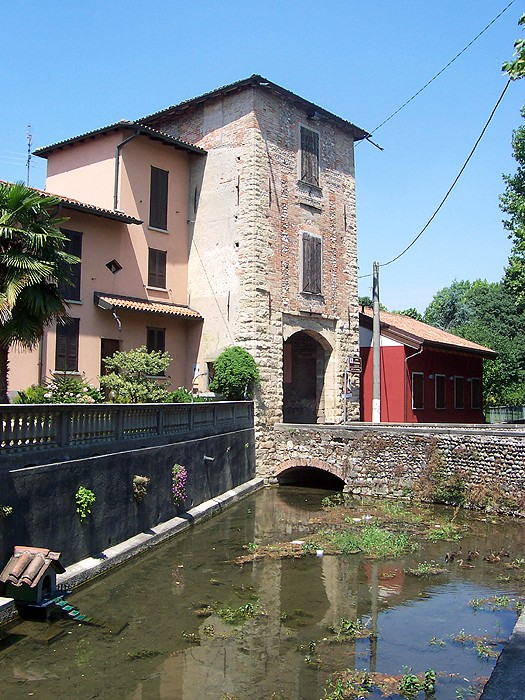
Gates. Clockwise from upper left: Porta Antignano, Porta Rocca, Porta Cassatica, Porta Moringhello

==== The Rocca ====
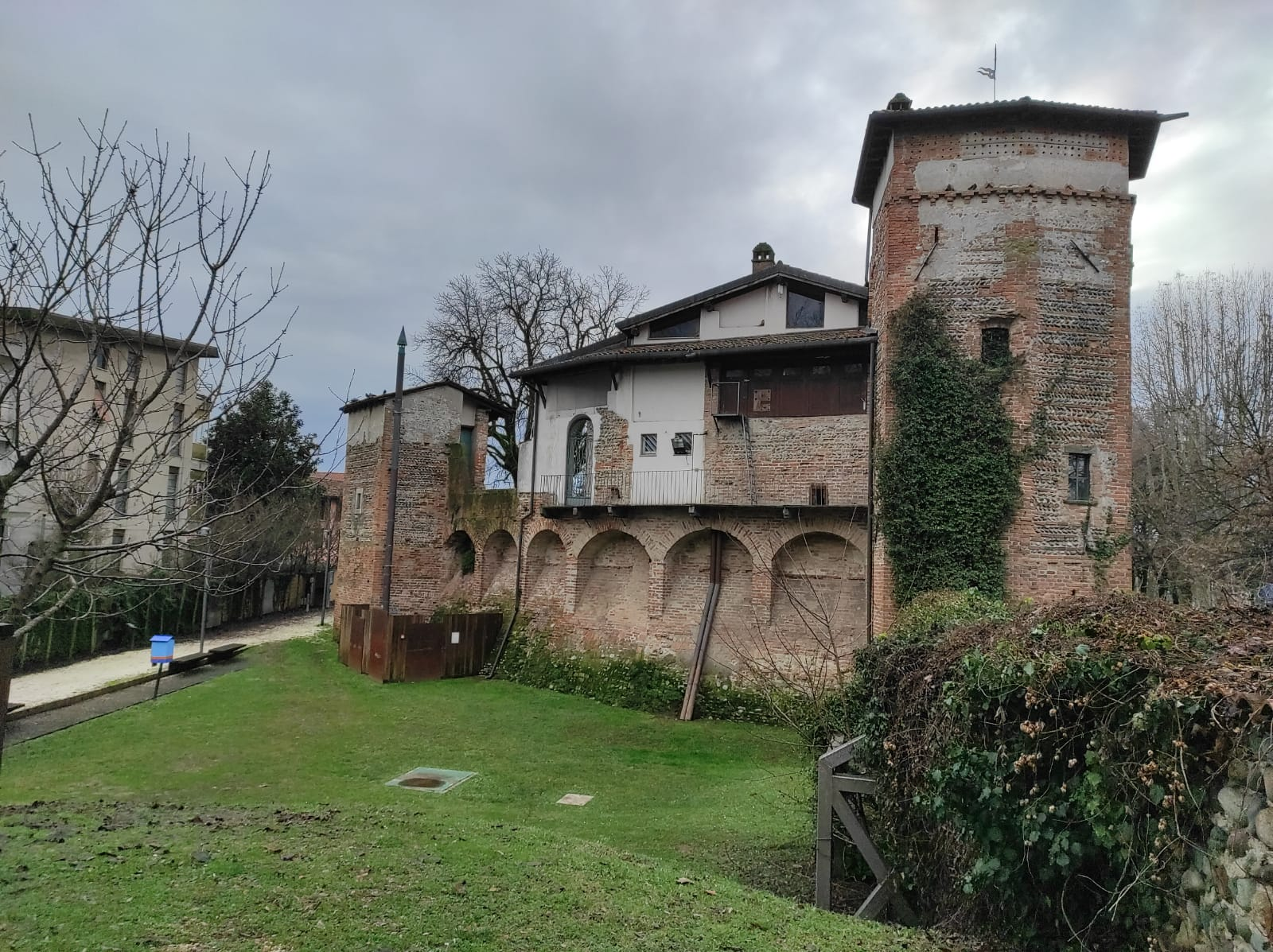
The Rocca fortress.

The fortress is a fundamental part of the defensive structures that characterize the town of Cologno al Serio; only a part of the fortress, dating back to the sixteenth century, can be observed. Will the technological development in the field of war (such for example, gunpowder), in fact, the already precarious walls were not sufficient to contain any warfare enemy. It was therefore decided to modify the defensive structure of the fortress and, in general, of the entire fortification, adapting it to the new war needs of the time. For example, a north curtain and a hexagonal flanking tower were added, always to the north.

The fortress was built with river pebbles and bricks, arranged in a fishbone form. The escarpment of the curtains, built using bricks, departs from the rest of the fortification, to suggest that it had been added later to further improve the defence. The fortress is accessed through an arched portal that presents the coat of arms of Cologno al Serio and that connects to the central tower. There are also two androns, one of which was used to trap enemies who wanted to enter the tower, while the other served as a stationary place for the guard corps.

The Rocca is shaped like a semicircle that connects to the curtain places to the north at the corner towers, while the walls are made up of arches to support the vertical wall and the battlements. In the middle of the fortress, moreover, there was an additional tower with a drawbridge that opened on an independent moat.

==== Castel Liteggio ====
The castle of Liteggio, of medieval origins, is located in the homonymous locality on the edge of the town and it was built in the fifteenth century by the Visconti. There are still visible parts of the embattled masonry and the moat, details that made it a very powerful fortification.

=== Religious architecture ===
Worthy of note is the church of Santa Maria Assunta. The church was built in 1745 and it has a Baroque facade and it has valuable works of art, including those of Gian Paolo Cavagna and Buratti.

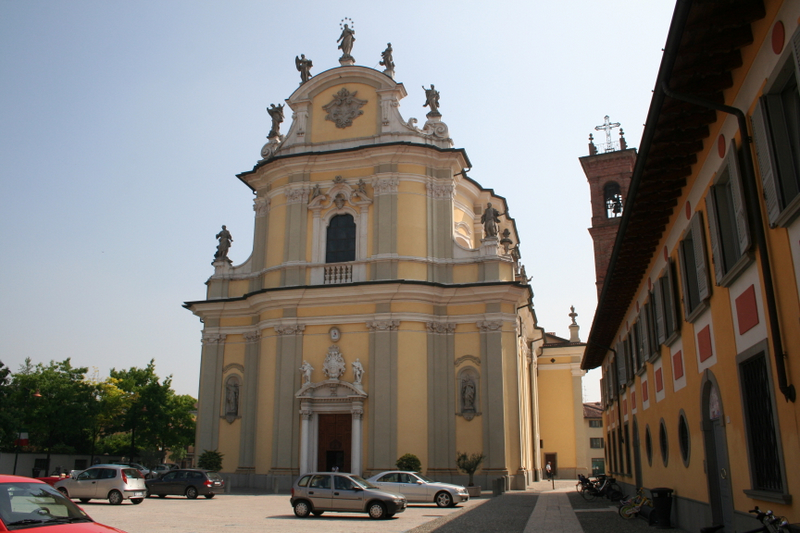
Main church 'Santa Maria Assunta'.

==== Other churches and chapels ====
- Morti dell'Arca:on the border with the town of Spirano there is the locality called "Morti dell'Arca", where there is a small chapel. It is reached by following a narrow road following a path marked by a stone cippus and characterized by the presence of crosses that signal the stations of the Corpus Domini. Near the Morti dell'Arca, a stone ark was also found. Studies after this finding have shown that in this locality stood a church dating back to the fifteenth century, built on a settlement dating back to the late Roman Empire.
- Church of the Santissima Trinità: fifteenth century, inside which there are some paintings attributed to Carlo Ceresa
- Church of the Annunciata
- Church of Saint Pancrazio
- Church of Saint Pope Gregory, known also as the "Campino chapel"
- Church of Saint Anna, in the locality of "Fornasette", frazione of Cologno al Serio
- Church dedicated to the Immaculate, in the locality of "Muratella", frazione of Cologno al Serio. This church has a late sixteenth-century architecture, evidenced by the brick facade and the bell tower with decorative paintings.

== The Campino ==
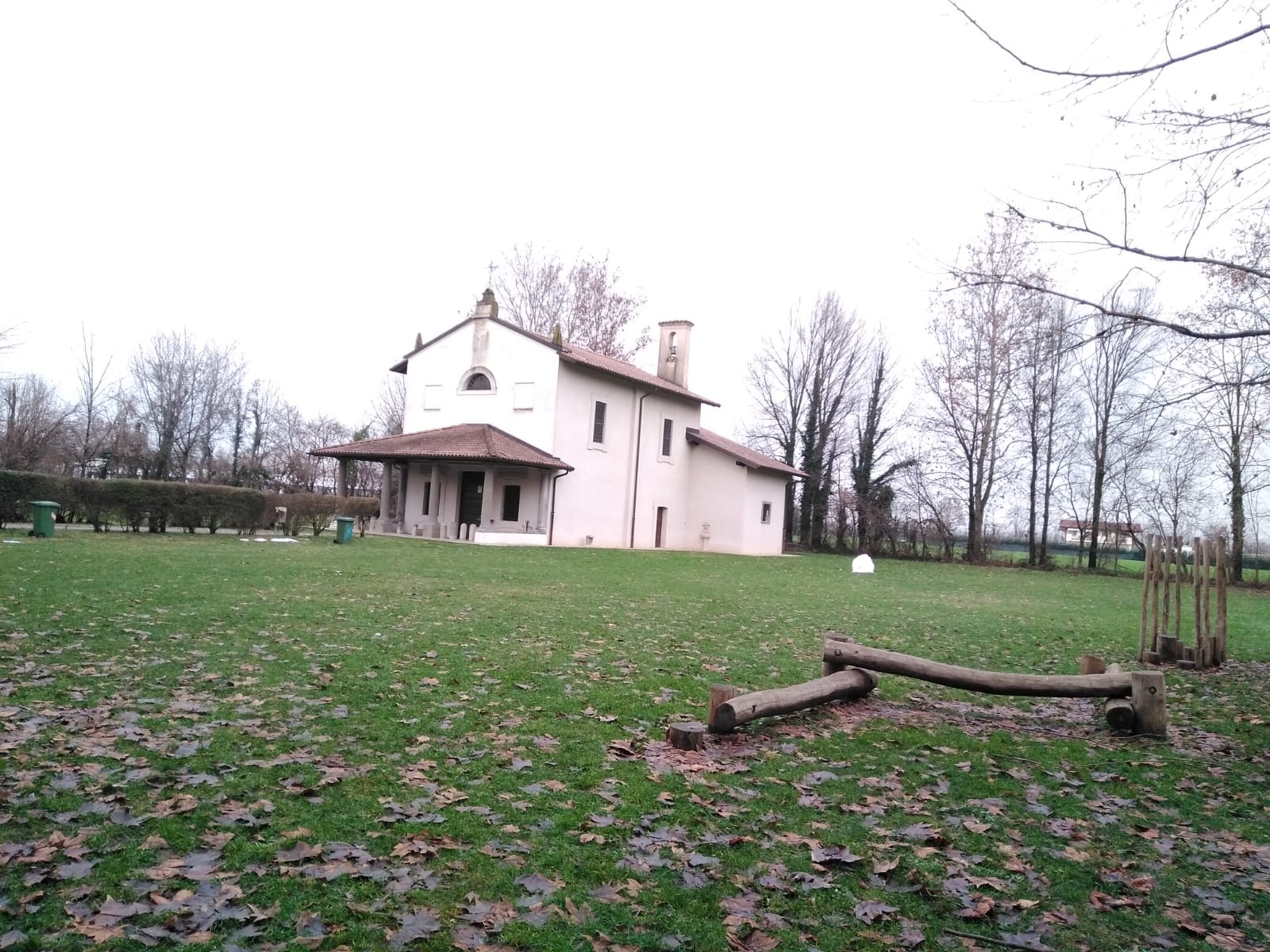
Campino.

The epidemic of bubonic plague of 1630 affected several areas of the north, including the territory of the provinces of Bergamo and the territory of Cologno al Serio. The Venetian government intervened by implementing measures to contain the contagion; one of these was the construction of a lazaretto in the municipality territory. Initially, about one hundred people were hospitalized. A prior was also appointed to supervise the patients, supported by armed sentries, in order to prevent the sick from breaking the quarantine or the rules of visiting their loved ones. The dead were covered with clay and buried in the lazaretto itself, to avoid further spread of contagion.

The lazaretto was built in a rural area near the river Serio, commonly known as "Campino". The choice of this place was dictated by epidemiological reasons: this location, in fact, is about 3.5 kilometres from the town, a distance such as to avoid contact between infected and healthy people but, at the same time, sufficiently small to allow smooth and rapid transport of patients. The accommodation of the sick within the lazaret followed precise health rules; for example, it was forbidden to expose the sick to the wind from the West because, at the time, it was believed that it was harmful and putrid.

Before the spread of the disease and the opening of the lazaretto, the Campino was an uncultivated field in which there was a small chapel. At the end of the plague, the people from Cologno, as a sign of thanksgiving, converted the chapel into a small church dedicated to St. Gregory the Great. Outside the facade of the church was also built an atrium protected by columns. Two marble tombstones report engravings to witness the event. The Campino, as well as being a devotional place, is a municipal park also equipped with volleyball and football fields. In summer the place is animated by popular festivals.

== The coat of arms ==
The coat of arms of Cologno al Serio, dating back to the twelfth-thirteenth century, represents a column surmounted by a crown. The column of the coat of arms recalls the name of the village and was, therefore, taken to the symbol of the same. Also the current banner of Cologno al Serio, white and yellow, has medieval origins. Both the ancient coat of arms and the modern banner have been approved with a Decree of the President of the Republic on 16 April 1976.

== Demographic evolution ==
Population census
Year	1861	1871	1881	1901	1911	1921	1931	1941	1951	1961	1971	1981	1991	2001	2011	2021
Pop.	2,653	3,104	3,105	3,478	4,188	4,459	4,694	4,761	5,609	6,104	7,207	8,012	8,836	9,442	10,596	11,178
±%	—	+17.0%	+0.0%	+12.0%	+20.4%	+6.5%	+5.3%	+1.4%	+17.8%	+8.8%	+18.1%	+11.2%	+10.3%	+6.9%	+12.2%	+5.5%
Source: Census population

=== Ethnic groups and foreign minorities ===
As of December 31, 2019, there are 1260 foreigners residing in the municipality of Cologno al Serio and representing 11.3% of the resident population. The most represented nationalities are:

- Romania 241
- India 204
- Morocco 171
- Albania 168
- Senegal 121
- Pakistan 69
- North Macedonia 64

== Municipal Administration ==
Cologno al Serio Administration
From	To	Mayor	Party	Role
1993	1997	Lazzari Gesualdo	DC	Mayor
1997	2001	Labaa Guido	Lega Nord	Mayor
2001	2006	Legramanti Roberto Antonio	Lega Nord	Mayor
2006	2011	Legramanti Roberto Antonio	Lega Nord	Mayor
2011	2016	Sesani Francesco Claudio	Lega Nord	Mayor
2016	ongoing	Drago Chiara	Non - party list	Mayor

== Twin towns ==
Cologno al Serio is twinned with:

- Ukmergė, Lithuania
- Gmina Tarnowo Podgórne, Poland

== Bibliography ==
- Agostino Saba, Storia dei papi (volume 2), Torino, UTET, 1936.
- Armazio Possenti, Cesare Rota, Bergamo e la sua pianura: arte, storia, natura della pianura bergamasca, Bergamo, 1996.
- Arturo Arfuzzi, AA.VV. Cologno al Serio: nuovi studi (volume 2), Cologno al Serio, Istituto Italiano dei Castelli, Sezione Lombardia, Delegazione di Bergamo, 2006.
- Barbara Oggionni, Alla scoperta della pianura bergamasca: i luoghi della fede, Treviglio e territorio, Treviglio, Sistema culturale integrato della bassa pianura bergamasca, 2020.
- Barbara Oggionni, Pianura da scoprire: guida ai 24 comuni dello IAT di Treviglio e territorio, Treviglio, Clessidra, 2005.
- Francesco Cusani, Storia di Milano, dall'origine ai giorni nostri e cenno storico-statistici sulle città e province lombardi (volume 6), Milano, 1867.
- Lino Lazzari, Il servo inutile. Don Cirillo Pizio (volume 2), Clusone, Edizioni Cesare Ferrari, 1991.
- Lino Lazzari, Silvana Milesi, Cologno al Serio. Cologno al Serio, Edizioni di Cesare Ferrari- Cassa Rurale Artigiana di Cologno al Serio, 1983.
- Mario Locatelli, Paolo Da Re (fotografie), I castelli della Bergamasca (volume 2), Bergamo, Il Conventino, 1978.
- Giacomo Drago, Cologno al Serio (volume 1), Cologno al Serio, 2006.
- Giacomo Drago, La storia di Cologno al Serio, Cologno al Serio, 1963.
- Vittore Ottolini, La rivoluzione lombarda dal 1848-1849, Milano, HOEPLI, 1887.
