= Arcene =

- Comune
- Comune di Arcene
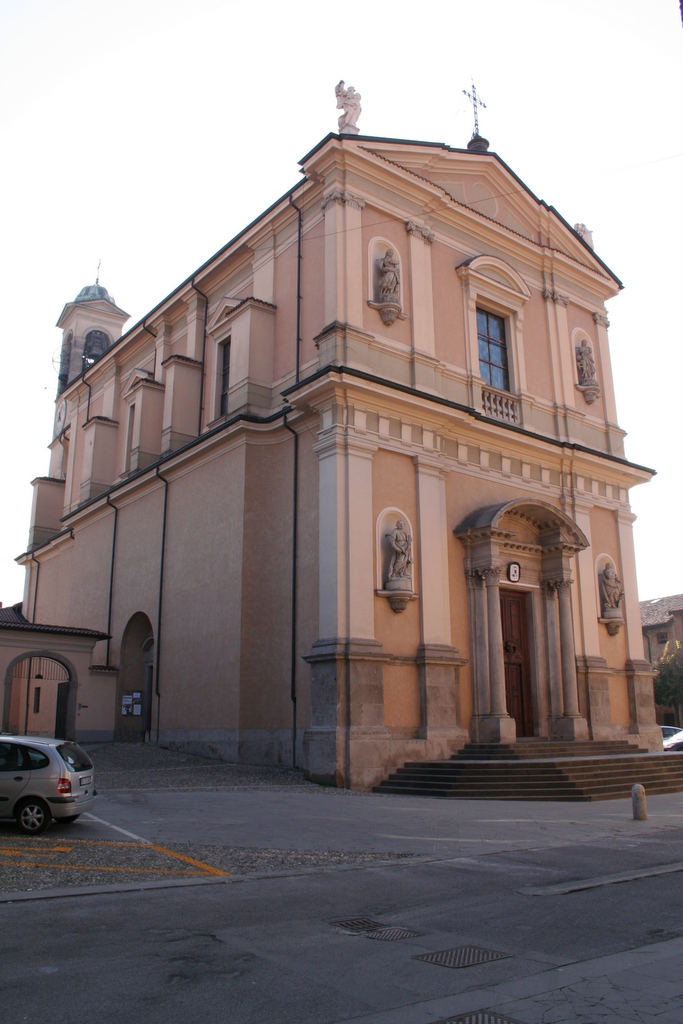
- Church of Saint Michael, Arcene

- Coat of arms

- Location of Arcene in Italy Arcene (Lombardy)
- Coordinates: 45°35′N 9°37′E
- Country: Italy
- Region: Lombardy
- Province: Province of Bergamo (BG)

Government
  - Mayor: Roberto Ravanelli

Area
  - Total: 4.2 km^{2} (1.6 sq mi)
- Elevation: 152 m (499 ft)

Population (Dec. 2004)
  - Total: 4,529
  - Density: 1,100/km^{2} (2,800/sq mi)
- Demonym: Arcenesi
- Time zone: UTC+1 (CET)
  - Summer (DST): UTC+2 (CEST)
- Postal code: 24040
- Dialing code: 035
- Website: Official website

Arcene (Bergamasque: Àrsen) is a comune (municipality) in the Province of Bergamo in the Italian region of Lombardy, located about 35 kilometres (22 mi) northeast of Milan and about 14 kilometres (9 mi) southwest of Bergamo. As of 31 December 2004, it had a population of 4,529 and an area of 4.2 square kilometres (1.6 mi^{2}).

Arcene borders the following municipalities: Castel Rozzone, Ciserano, Lurano, Pognano, Pontirolo Nuovo, Treviglio, Verdello.

== Demographic evolution ==
Historical population

| Year | Pop. | ±% |
|---|---|---|
| 1861 | 1,683 | — |
| 1871 | 1,717 | +2.0% |
| 1881 | 1,872 | +9.0% |
| 1901 | 2,007 | +7.2% |
| 1911 | 2,161 | +7.7% |

| Year | Pop. | ±% |
|---|---|---|
| 1921 | 2,175 | +0.6% |
| 1931 | 2,347 | +7.9% |
| 1936 | 2,213 | −5.7% |
| 1951 | 2,472 | +11.7% |
| 1961 | 2,647 | +7.1% |

| Year | Pop. | ±% |
|---|---|---|
| 1971 | 2,898 | +9.5% |
| 1981 | 3,640 | +25.6% |
| 1991 | 4,145 | +13.9% |
| 2001 | 4,347 | +4.9% |

Source: Data from ISTAT
