= Visconti Rocca (Urgnano) =

Castle in northern Italy

- Rocca Viscontea di Urgnano
- Urgnano, Lombardy, Northern Italy
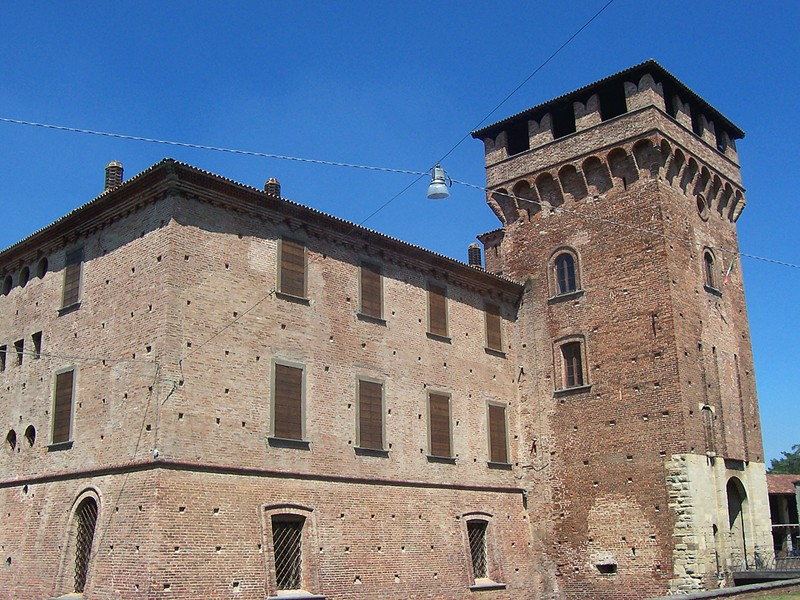
- Southwestern corner with the main entrance

Site information
- Type: Rocca
- Owner: Urgnano municipality
- Open to the public: Yes
- Condition: Good

Location
- Coordinates: 45°35′55″N 9°41′39″E

Site history
- Built: 1354
- Built by: Giovanni Visconti
- Materials: Bricks

The Visconti Rocca of Urgnano, also known as Visconti Castle or Albani Rocca, is a middle age fortification in Urgnano, Lombardy in northern Italy. It was built in 1354 by Giovanni Visconti, Archbishop, and Lord of Milan. Today, it is the property of the Urgnano municipality.

== History ==
The lord of Milan and archbishop Giovanni Visconti built the castle in 1354 in the northern part of the ancient fortified Urgnano village, connecting it to the circle of walls. In 1464, under the new Venetian rule, Urgnano passed to Bartolomeo Colleoni. Subsequently, during the 16th century, the fortification passed under the Albani counts, who adapted it into a more livable castle. In the 18th century, the castle underwent further modifications for the final transformation into a residential palace.

The walls were made of exposed brick, in line with the tradition of the Visconti castles of Lombard plain.

Since the 19th century, despite being used as a school, the Rocca has severely declined. During the 20th century, passed to the Urgnano municipality, the Rocca was restored and used as a public library and center for cultural activities.

== Today ==
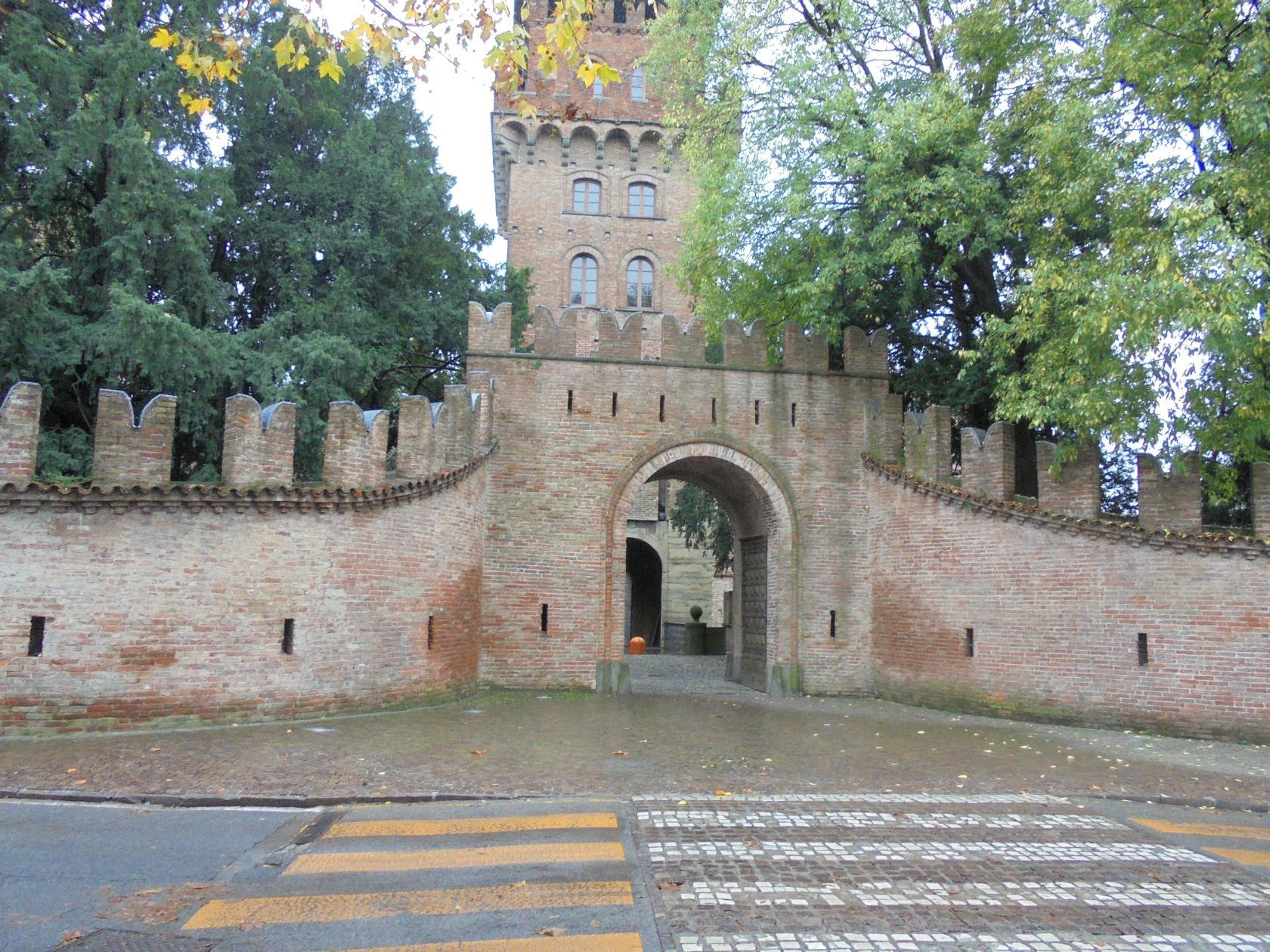
Northern entrance

Of the original Visconti fortress, despite the numerous alterations carried out over the centuries, significant elements are still preserved today, such as the high chemise, a part of the crenelated curtain walls, the surrounding moat, the two towers on the respective entrances to the north and noon, the hanging tower on the northeastern corner. The footprints of the drawbridges and pedestrian bridges survived on the two doors.

The external area to the north and the garden inside the castle are green spaces open to the public.

== Sources ==
- Conti, Flavio; Hybsch, Vincenzo; Vincenti, Antonello (1993). I castelli della Lombardia. Provincie di Bergamo e Brescia (in Italian). Novara: Istituto Geografico de Agostini. ISBN 88-415-0161-8.
- Touring Club Italiano (2006). Lombardia. Varese e il lago Maggiore, Bergamo e la pianura bergamasca, Cremona e il suo territorio (in Italian). Milano: Touring Club Italiano. ISBN 978-8836527038.
