= Castel Rozzone =

- Comune
- Comune di Castel Rozzone
- Church

- Coat of arms

- Location within Italy Location within Lombardy
- Coordinates: 45°33′N 9°38′E
- Country: Italy
- Region: Lombardy
- Province: Province of Bergamo (BG)

Area
  - Total: 1.7 km^{2} (0.66 sq mi)
- Elevation: 140 m (460 ft)

Population (Dec. 2004)
  - Total: 2,705
  - Density: 1,600/km^{2} (4,100/sq mi)
- Demonym: Castelrozzonesi
- Time zone: UTC+1 (CET)
  - Summer (DST): UTC+2 (CEST)
- Postal code: 24040
- Dialing code: 0363

Castel Rozzone (Bergamasque: Castèl Russù) is a comune (municipality) in the Province of Bergamo in the Italian region of Lombardy, located about 40 kilometres (25 mi) east of Milan and about 15 kilometres (9 mi) south of Bergamo. As of 31 December 2004, it had a population of 2,705 and an area of 1.7 square kilometres (0.66 mi^{2}).

Castel Rozzone borders the following municipalities: Arcene, Brignano Gera d'Adda, Lurano, Treviglio.

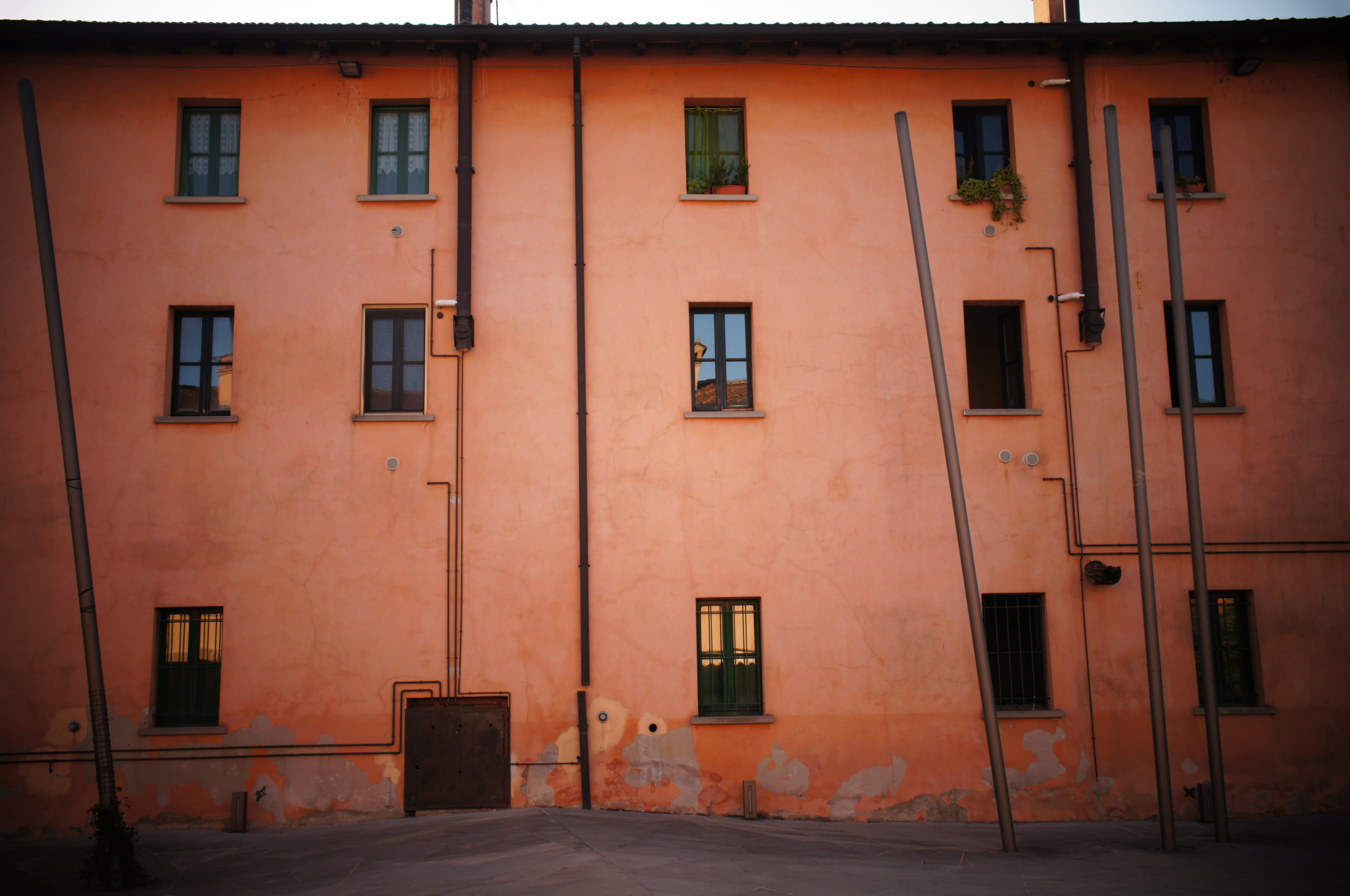
Former castle of the Visconty

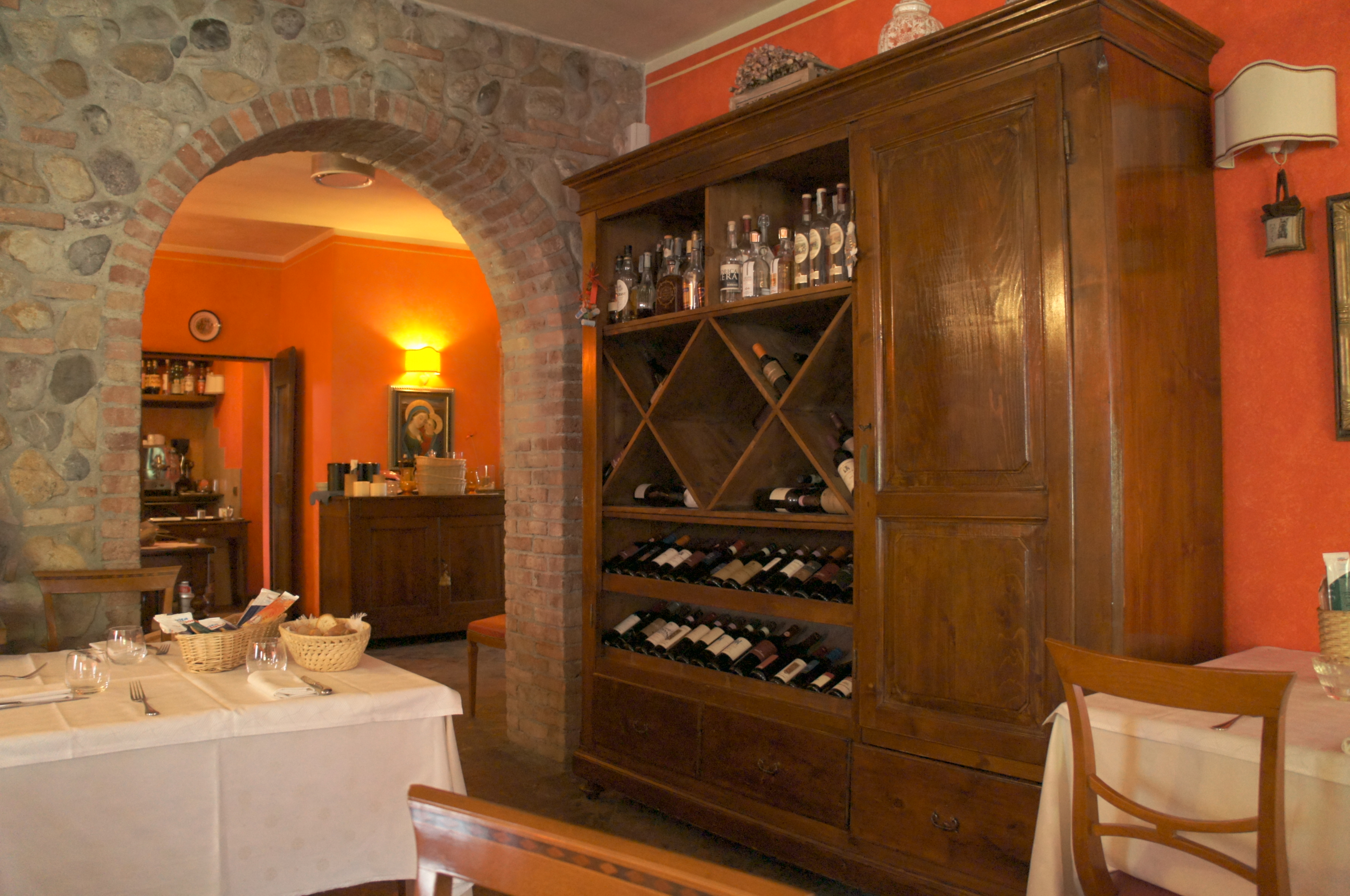
il Melograno Ristorante, first restaurant in Castel Rozzone

== Demographic evolution ==
Historical population

Year	Pop.	±%
1861	806	—
1871	786	−2.5%
1881	809	+2.9%
1901	944	+16.7%
1911	1,123	+19.0%

Year	Pop.	±%
1921	1,155	+2.8%
1931	1,236	+7.0%
1936	1,199	−3.0%
1951	1,423	+18.7%
1961	1,539	+8.2%

Year	Pop.	±%
1971	1,763	+14.6%
1981	2,079	+17.9%
1991	2,323	+11.7%
2001	2,545	+9.6%

Source: Data from ISTAT
