= Lurano =

- Comune
- Comune di Lurano
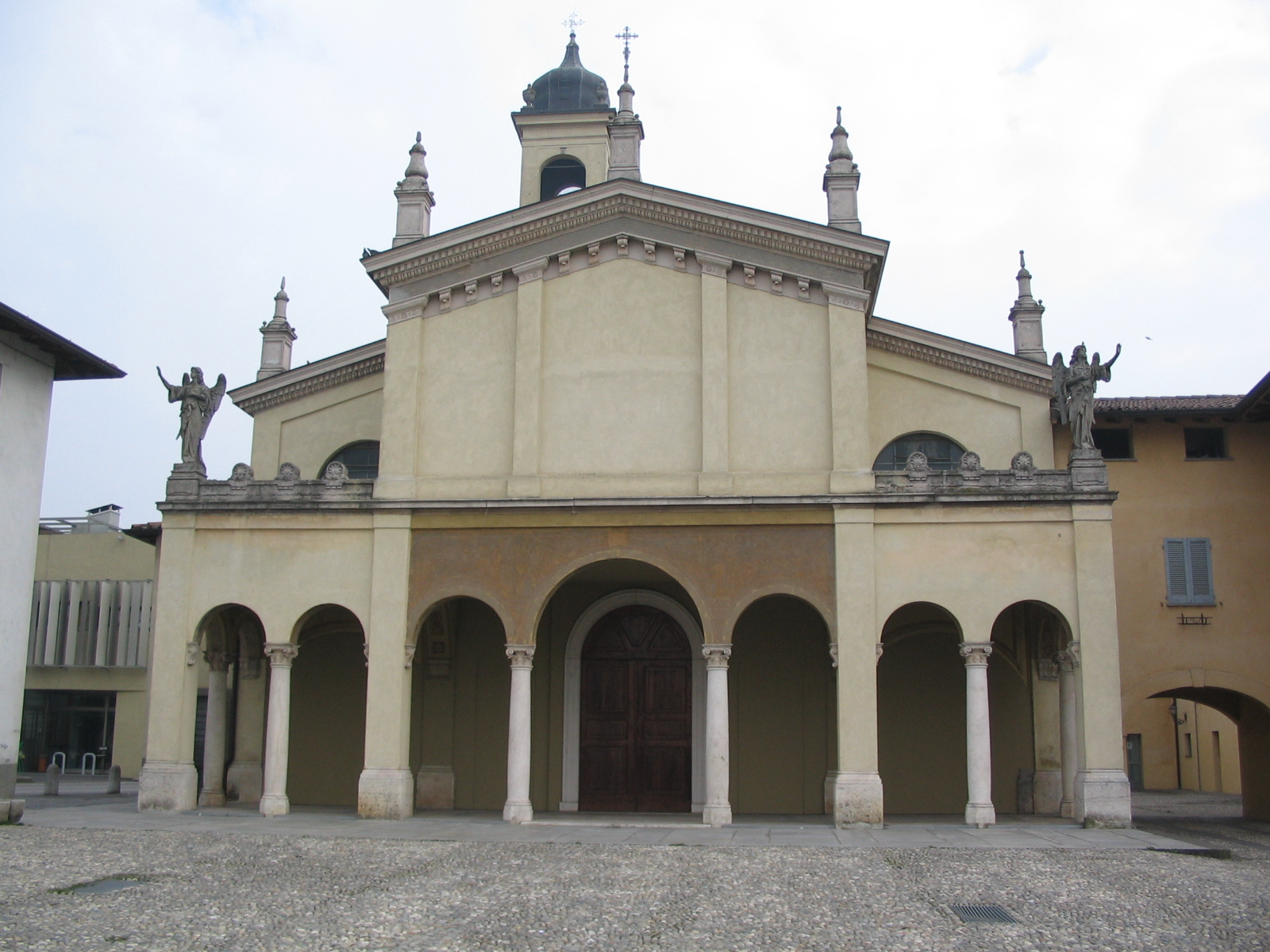
- San Lino Church

- Location within Italy Location within Lombardy
- Coordinates: 45°34′N 9°38′E
- Country: Italy
- Region: Lombardy
- Province: Province of Bergamo (BG)

Area
  - Total: 4.0 km^{2} (1.5 sq mi)
- Elevation: 147 m (482 ft)

Population (Dec. 2004)
  - Total: 2,201
  - Density: 550/km^{2} (1,400/sq mi)
- Demonym: Luranesi
- Time zone: UTC+1 (CET)
  - Summer (DST): UTC+2 (CEST)
- Postal code: 24050
- Dialing code: 035

Lurano (Bergamasque: Lörà) is a comune (municipality) in the Province of Bergamo in the Italian region of Lombardy, located about 40 kilometres (25 mi) northeast of Milan and about 15 kilometres (9 mi) south of Bergamo. As of 31 December 2004, it had a population of 2,201 and an area of 4.0 square kilometres (1.5 mi^{2}).

Lurano borders the following municipalities: Arcene, Brignano Gera d'Adda, Castel Rozzone, Pognano, Spirano.

== Demographic evolution ==
Historical population

| Year | Pop. | ±% |
|---|---|---|
| 1861 | 939 | — |
| 1871 | 963 | +2.6% |
| 1881 | 1,079 | +12.0% |
| 1901 | 1,033 | −4.3% |
| 1911 | 1,072 | +3.8% |

| Year | Pop. | ±% |
|---|---|---|
| 1921 | 1,169 | +9.0% |
| 1931 | 1,224 | +4.7% |
| 1936 | 1,220 | −0.3% |
| 1951 | 1,261 | +3.4% |
| 1961 | 1,193 | −5.4% |

| Year | Pop. | ±% |
|---|---|---|
| 1971 | 1,279 | +7.2% |
| 1981 | 1,475 | +15.3% |
| 1991 | 1,598 | +8.3% |
| 2001 | 2,093 | +31.0% |

Source: Data from ISTAT
