= Comun Nuovo =

- Comune
- Comune di Comun Nuovo
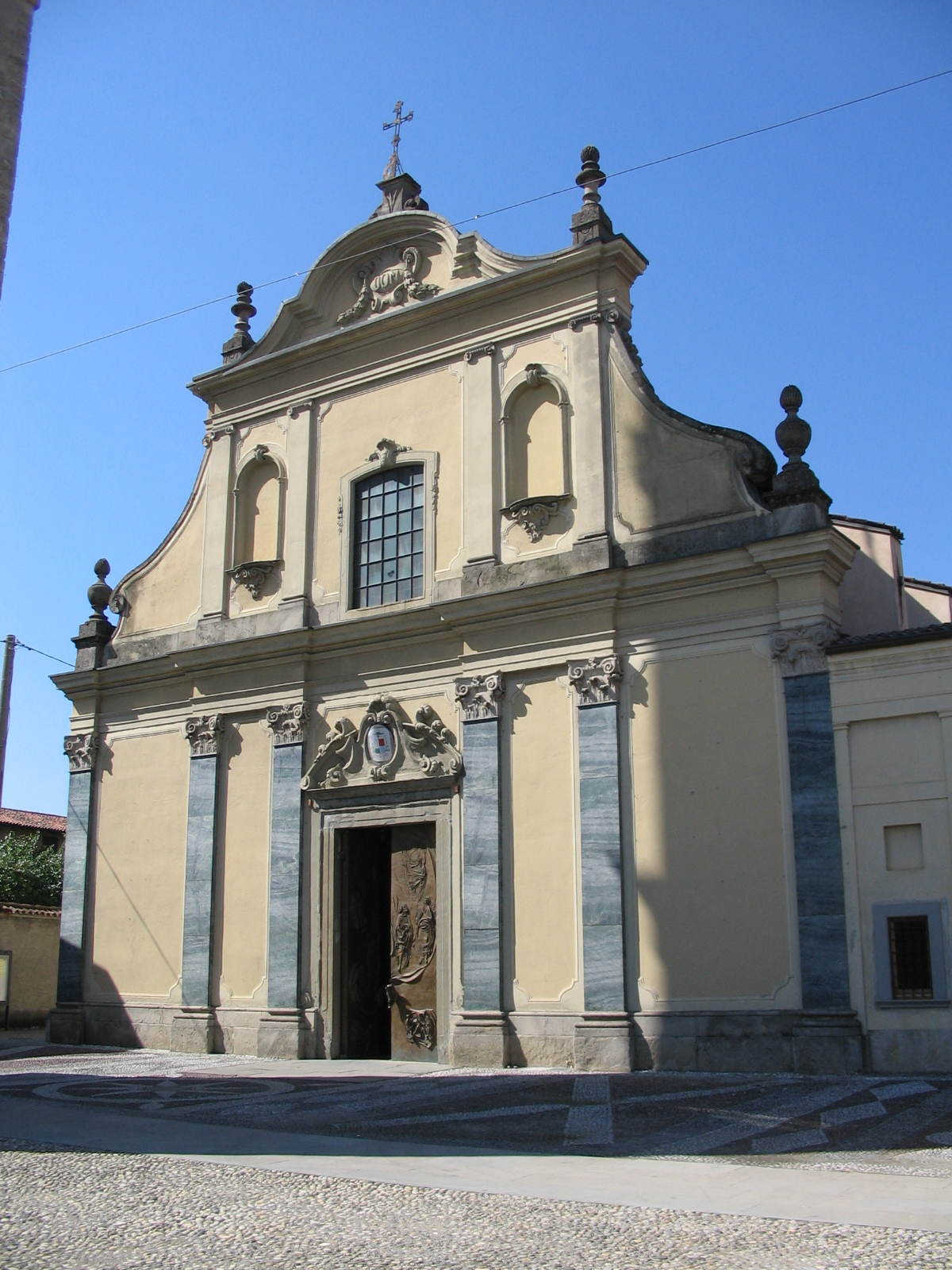
- San Salvatore Church

- Location within Italy Location within Lombardy
- Coordinates: 45°37′N 9°40′E
- Country: Italy
- Region: Lombardy
- Province: Bergamo

Government
  - Mayor: Ivan Moriggi

Area
  - Total: 6.45 km^{2} (2.49 sq mi)
- Elevation: 188 m (617 ft)

Population (30 June 2017)
  - Total: 4,397
  - Density: 682/km^{2} (1,770/sq mi)
- Demonym: Comunnuovesi
- Time zone: UTC+1 (CET)
  - Summer (DST): UTC+2 (CEST)
- Postal code: 24040
- Dialing code: 035
- Patron saint: S.S. Salvatore
- Website: Official website

Comun Nuovo (Bergamasque: Cümü Nöf) is a comune (municipality) in the Province of Bergamo in the Italian region of Lombardy, located about 40 kilometres (25 mi) northeast of Milan and about 9 kilometres (6 mi) south of Bergamo.

Comun Nuovo borders the following municipalities: Levate, Spirano, Stezzano, Urgnano, Verdello, Zanica.

The city is also known for the many companies that have located their offices in the small town. Heineken, Olmo and Fonderie Pietro Pilenga are among the companies that have headquarters in Comun Nuovo
