= Santissima Trinità, Urgnano =

Church in Urgnano, Italy

Santissima Trinità is a small, Roman Catholic church located in the outskirts of the old town of Urgnano, province of Bergamo, region of Lombardy, Italy.

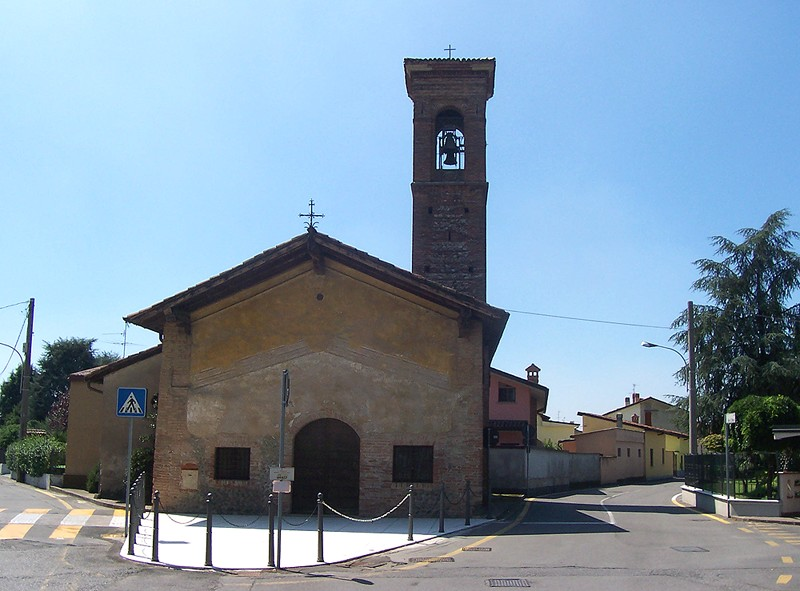
Facade and belltower

The church was erected in the 15th century, and the belltower retains some of the medieval construction with herringbone arrangements of stones. The interiors have elaborate 16th-century frescoes depicting the stories of the New Testament and a Last Judgment by an unknown Renaissance painter.
