= Santi Nazario e Celso, Urgnano =

Church in Lombardy, Italy

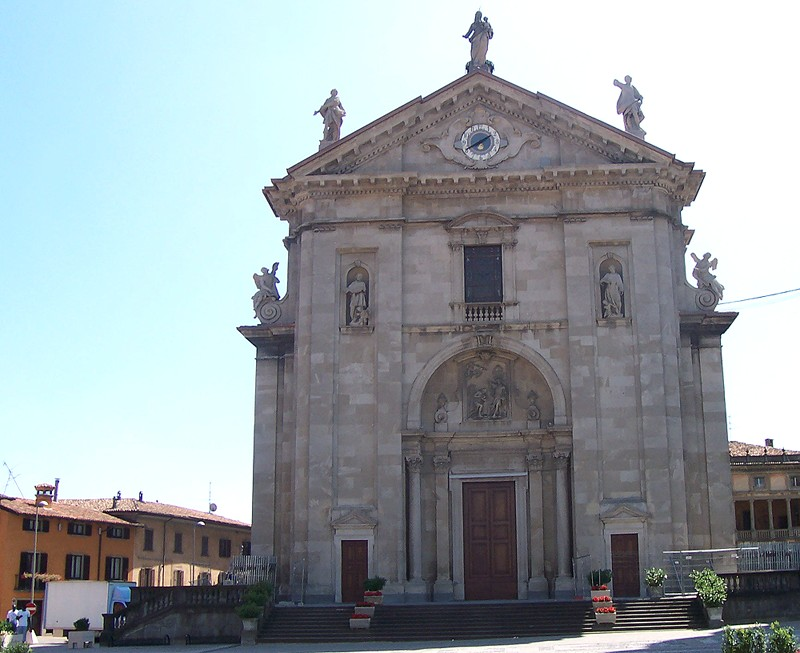
Urgnano - Parish Church of Sts. Nazario and Celso

Santi Nazario e Celso is the Roman Catholic parish church located in the center of the old town of Urgnano, province of Bergamo, region of Lombardy, Italy.

== History ==
The present church was erected during 1770–1787 in Neoclassical-style by Filippo Alessandri. The imposing façade has monumental Corinthian pilasters upholding a triangular tympanum. The roof line has statuary, crowned with a statue of the Madonna and Child, and the tympanum is flanked by decorative scrolls. The rounded arch of the indented central portal has bas-relief of the Baptism of Christ.

The interior is highly decorated. In the apse are two canvases depicting the Annunciation and Incarnation, while below are statues depicting the Risen Christ and the Virgin Mary. The main altar has a large marble ciborium with two flanking angel. The ceiling of the tall nave has large frescos. The wood pulpits are decorated with gilded wood. The church houses a crowded mannerist painting Pietà surrounded by scenes of the Passion attributed to the studio of Tintoretto. It houses a canvas depicting a Story of Santi Nazario e Celso (1843) by Giacomo Trécourt. One wall has a quattrocento fresco as an altarpiece.

The counter-façade above the door has a large canvas depicting the Cleansing of the Temple by Jesus. In the right nave is the Altar of the Madonna of the Holy Rosary with a wooden 18th-century processional statue. The altar has a reliquary with scenes of the 15 Mysteries of the Rosary.
