= Pontirolo Nuovo =

- Comune
- Comune di Pontirolo Nuovo
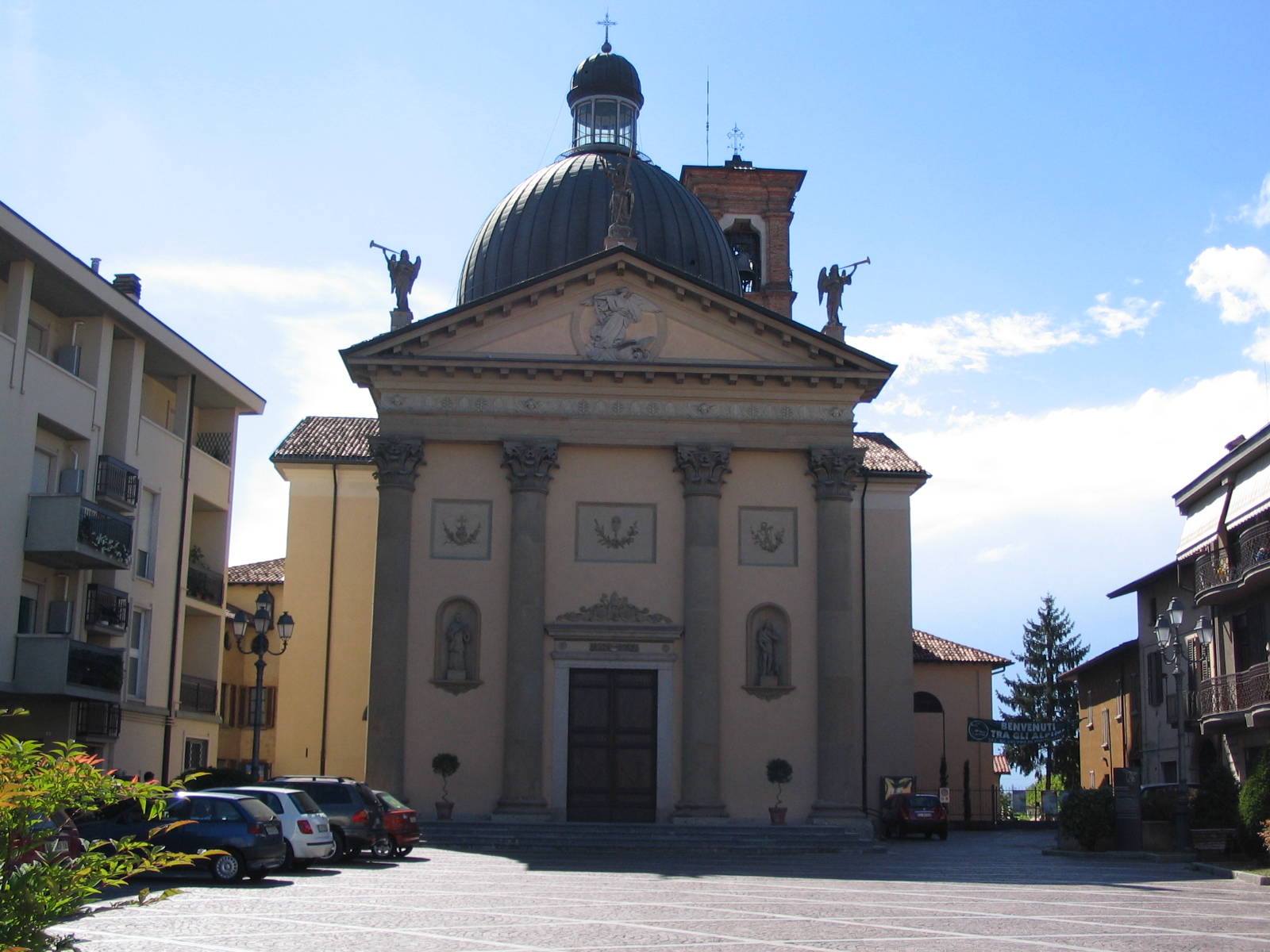
- Church

- Location within Italy Location within Lombardy
- Coordinates: 45°34′N 9°34′E
- Country: Italy
- Region: Lombardy
- Province: Province of Bergamo (BG)
- Frazioni: Fornasotto, PONCIPARELLO

Area
  - Total: 10.8 km^{2} (4.2 sq mi)
- Elevation: 155 m (509 ft)

Population (Dec. 2004)
  - Total: 4,649
  - Density: 430/km^{2} (1,110/sq mi)
- Demonym: Pontirolesi
- Time zone: UTC+1 (CET)
  - Summer (DST): UTC+2 (CEST)
- Postal code: 24040
- Dialing code: 0363

Pontirolo Nuovo (Bergamasque: Puntiröl) is a comune (municipality) in the Province of Bergamo in the Italian region of Lombardy, located about 40 kilometres (25 mi) northeast of Milan and about 18 kilometres (11 mi) northeast of Bergamo. As of 31 December 2004, it had a population of 4,649 and an area of 10.8 square kilometres (4.2 mi^{2}).

The municipality of Pontirolo Nuovo contains the frazione (subdivision) Fornasotto.

Pontirolo Nuovo borders the following municipalities: Arcene, Boltiere, Brembate, Canonica d'Adda, Ciserano, Fara Gera d'Adda, Treviglio.

== Demographic evolution ==
Historical population

Year	Pop.	±%
1861	1,531	—
1871	1,782	+16.4%
1881	1,770	−0.7%
1901	2,184	+23.4%
1911	2,436	+11.5%

Year	Pop.	±%
1921	2,516	+3.3%
1931	2,633	+4.7%
1936	2,647	+0.5%
1951	2,958	+11.7%
1961	3,146	+6.4%

Year	Pop.	±%
1971	3,406	+8.3%
1981	3,635	+6.7%
1991	3,862	+6.2%
2001	4,241	+9.8%

Source: Data from ISTAT
