= Francesco Bernardino Visconti =

Italian nobleman and brigand (1579–1647)

- Lord of Brignano Gera d'Adda
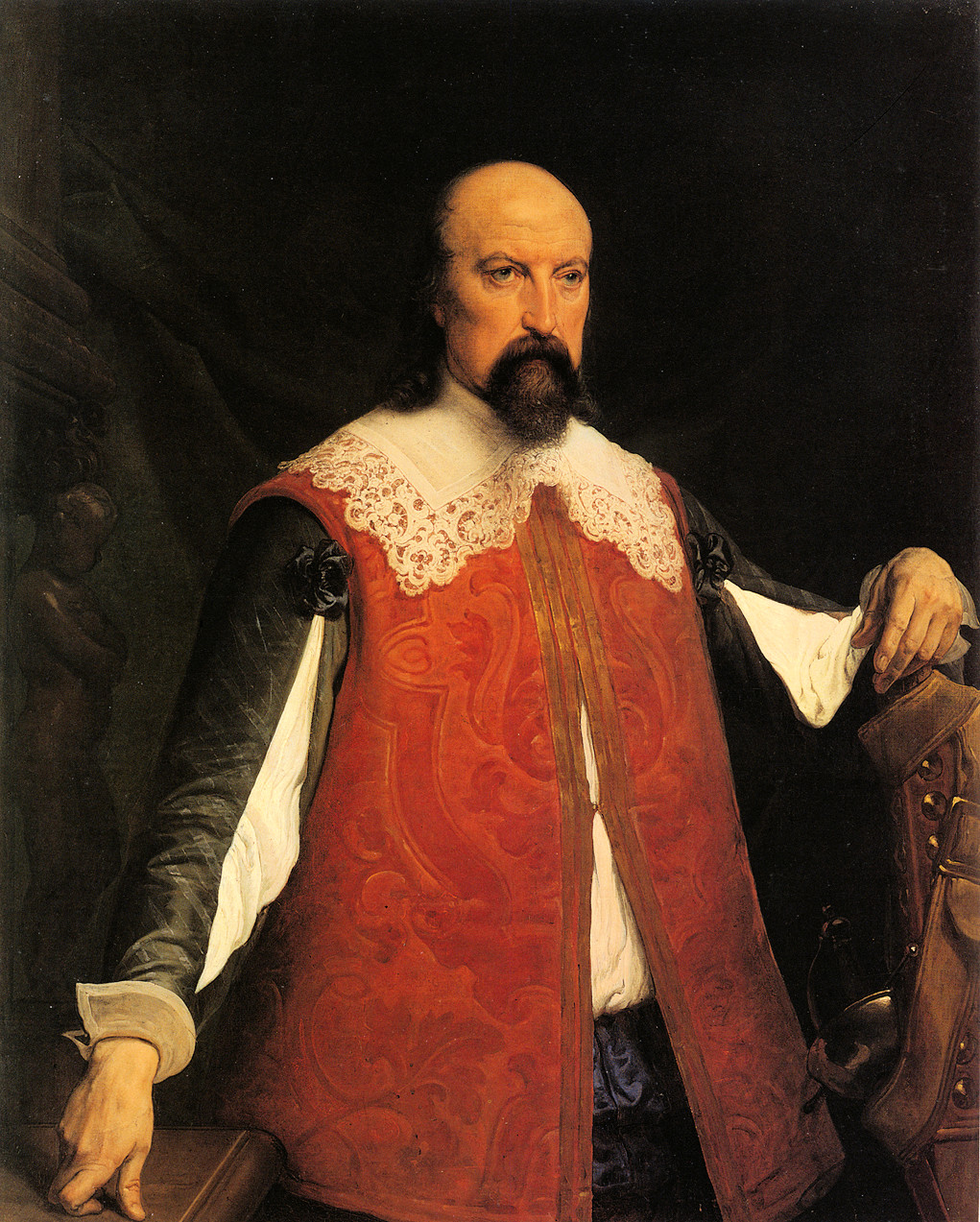
- Portrait of Francesco Bernardino Visconti by Francesco Hayez

- Coat of arms
- Reign: 1582-1647
- Predecessor: Giovanni Battista Visconti
- Successor: Bernabò Visconti
- Born: 16 September 1579; Brignano Gera d'Adda, Duchy of Milan
- Died: 1647 (aged 67–68); Crema, Duchy of Milan
- Noble family: Visconti of Milan

Francesco Bernardino Visconti, 4th Lord of Brignano Gera d'Adda (16 September 1579 – c. 1647), was an Italian nobleman and brigand. He served as an inspiration for the creation of "the Unnamed", one of the main characters of Alessandro Manzoni's novel The Betrothed.

== Biography ==
Francesco Bernardino Visconti was the son of Giovanni Battista Visconti and Paola Benzoni. His father was a descendant of the lord of Milan Bernabò Visconti, while his mother belonged to an important family of Crema. He had five siblings: Maddalena, Giulia, Ercole, Caterina, and Galeazzo Maria (1575-1648).

Francesco Bernardino was born in the castle of Brignano Gera d'Adda, and spent his childhood in Crema in the Palazzo Benzoni. He studied at the College of Nobles of Milan, an educational institution primarily for the sons of Milanese nobility. Upon the death of his father in 1584, he settled with his brother Galeazzo Maria in the Palazzo di Prospero Visconti.

In 1593, the fourteen-year-old Francesco Bernardino, at the head of twenty-six armed men, broke into the home of a wealthy man in Bagnolo Cremasco, devastating it. On December 22, the Council of Ten of Crema decreed his banishment from the city.

=== Criminal activity ===
Francesco Bernardino retired to his estate, called Sangiorgino, formed a band of masnadieri (brigands) and began his criminal activity. From 1593 to 1599, he committed a series of crimes, including two murders. He became one of the most feared outlaws of his day. In 1602 his assets were confiscated by the authorities and the following year the governor of Milan placed a 200 scudi bounty on his head. Visconti fled to Switzerland, then took refuge in one of his hideouts, the castle of Vercurago, an impregnable mountain fortress guarded by dozens of well-armed men, on the border between the Republic of Venice and the Duchy of Milan.

=== The conversion ===
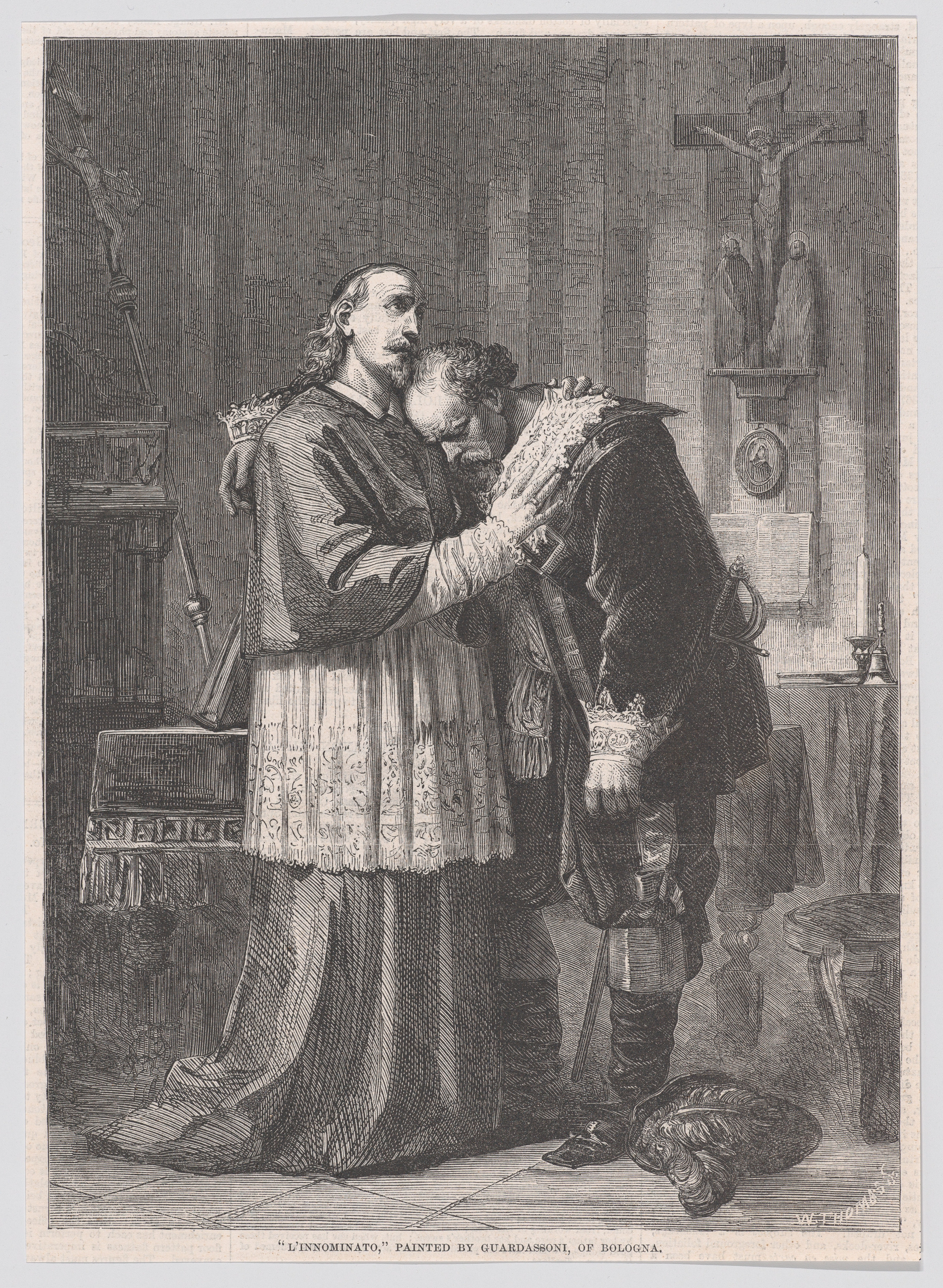
The conversion of the Unnamed in an engraving by William Luson Thomas, published in The Illustrated London News on 19 July 1862

In 1615, Cardinal Federico Borromeo met Visconti, with whom he spoke for two hours. The meeting was probably arranged by Visconti's relatives. The conversion of Francesco Bernardino Visconti is told in different ways by the various contemporary 17th-century biographers of the Cardinal. Some have the Cardinal himself climbing up the rocky path to Visconti's eagle nest to knock at the reprobate's door. Manzoni followed the gist of Giuseppe Ripamonti, who told of how Visconti descended to see the Cardinal when he heard he was on a pastoral visit in the vicinity. Following the meeting Visconti came to a sensational repentance and abandoned his criminal life.

According to a document dated 1647, he lived in a town near Crema, his mother's birthplace. Francesco Bernardino spent his last years in prayer and meditation in some convents in Crema, especially that of the Capuchin friars in the Sabbioni district. He died around 1647 in the Palazzo Benzoni in Crema, at the age of 68, and was buried in his mother's family tomb, in the cathedral of Santa Maria Assunta.

== Francesco Bernardino Visconti in literature ==
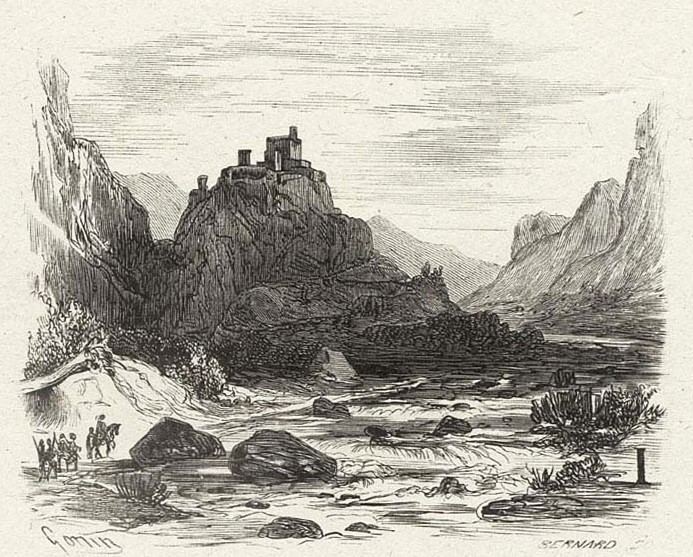
The castle of the Unnamed in an illustration by Francesco Gonin for the 1840 edition of The Betrothed

Francesco Bernardino Visconti served as an inspiration for the creation of the Unnamed, one of the main characters of Alessandro Manzoni's novel The Betrothed. In Fermo e Lucia, the abandoned first draft of The Betrothed, Manzoni made use of this personage in the role of the Conte del Sagrato, a trivial delinquent who undergoes a brusque conversion.

By the time of the definitive edition, however, the Innominato, or the Unnamed, as he is now called, has been transformed into an introspective and solitary figure of tragic solemnity. He lives in a castle fortress perched above a gloomy valley 'on the summit of a peak that projects out from a rugged chain of mountains' ('sulla cima d'un poggio che sporge in fuori da un'aspra giogaia di monti'). From this eyrie the Innominato dominates the countryside 'like the eagle from its bloody nest' ('come l'aquila dal suo nido insanguinato'). His ambition has always been to command, and all the men of substance in the neighbourhood are forced to choose between having him as their friend or their enemy.

Among those who have cast in their lot with the Innominato is Don Rodrigo, whose estate is situated but seven miles from that of the Innominato. Even before the arrival of Lucia, betrayed into the hands of Nibbio by the Nun of Monza, the Innominato is in a state of spiritual turmoil. It is only to dissimulate his fears that he has agreed to carry Lucia off, and when we meet him [chap. XX] the first phase of his spiritual evolution is already over. The Innominato is restless before Lucia's arrival. When she is brought to him he puts off sending for Don Rodrigo. Soon all his attendants begin to feel compassion for her plight; and instead of awakening the Innominato's lust, Lucia, with her formidable candour and innocence, awakens his pity and his remorse. The episode of the conversion of the Unnamed [chap. XX-XXIII] is pivotal in the development of the novel's plot, and is described with fine psychological insight.

== Bibliography ==
- Gualtieri, Luigi (1928). L'Innominato. Milan: Bietti.
- Donini, Cesare (1937). Sull'Innominato. Treviglio: Bonomi.
- Dattero, Alessandra (2020). "VISCONTI, Francesco Bernardino". Dizionario Biografico degli Italiani (in Italian). Vol. 99: Verrazzano–Vittorio Amedeo. Rome: Institute of the Italian Encyclopaedia. ISBN 978-88-12-00032-6.
- Bloom, Harold (2020). The Bright Book of Life: Novels to Read and Reread. New York: Alfred A. Knopf. pp. 61–5.
