= Boltiere =

- Comune
- Comune di Boltiere
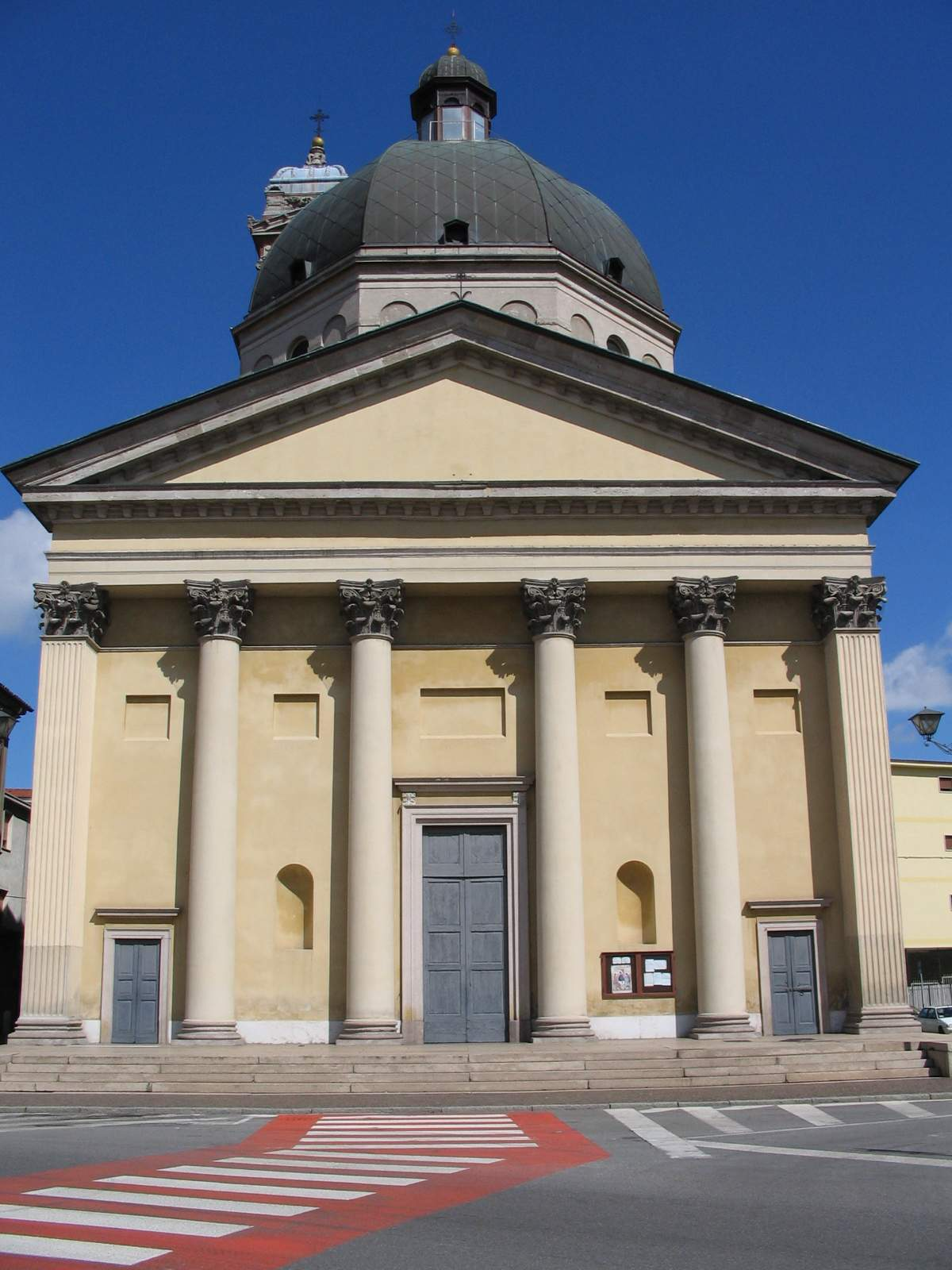
- Church in Boltiere

- Coat of arms

- Location within Italy Location within Lombardy
- Coordinates: 45°36′N 9°35′E
- Country: Italy
- Region: Lombardy
- Province: Province of Bergamo (BG)

Area
  - Total: 4.1 km^{2} (1.6 sq mi)
- Elevation: 171 m (561 ft)

Population (Dec. 2004)
  - Total: 4,695
  - Density: 1,100/km^{2} (3,000/sq mi)
- Demonym: Boltieresi
- Time zone: UTC+1 (CET)
  - Summer (DST): UTC+2 (CEST)
- Postal code: 24040
- Dialing code: 035

Boltiere (Bergamasque: Boltér) is a comune (municipality) in the Province of Bergamo in the Italian region of Lombardy, located about 35 kilometres (22 mi) northeast of Milan and about 13 kilometres (8 mi) southwest of Bergamo. As of 31 December 2004, it had a population of 4,695 and an area of 4.1 square kilometres (1.6 mi^{2}).

Boltiere borders the following municipalities: Brembate, Ciserano, Osio Sotto, Pontirolo Nuovo, Verdellino.

== Demographic evolution ==
Historical population

Year	Pop.	±%
1861	1,108	—
1871	1,261	+13.8%
1881	1,382	+9.6%
1901	1,424	+3.0%
1911	1,815	+27.5%

Year	Pop.	±%
1921	1,817	+0.1%
1931	2,080	+14.5%
1936	1,964	−5.6%
1951	2,191	+11.6%
1961	2,378	+8.5%

Year	Pop.	±%
1971	2,701	+13.6%
1981	2,927	+8.4%
1991	3,383	+15.6%
2001	4,181	+23.6%

Source: Data from ISTAT
