= Urgnano =

- Comune
- Comune di Urgnano
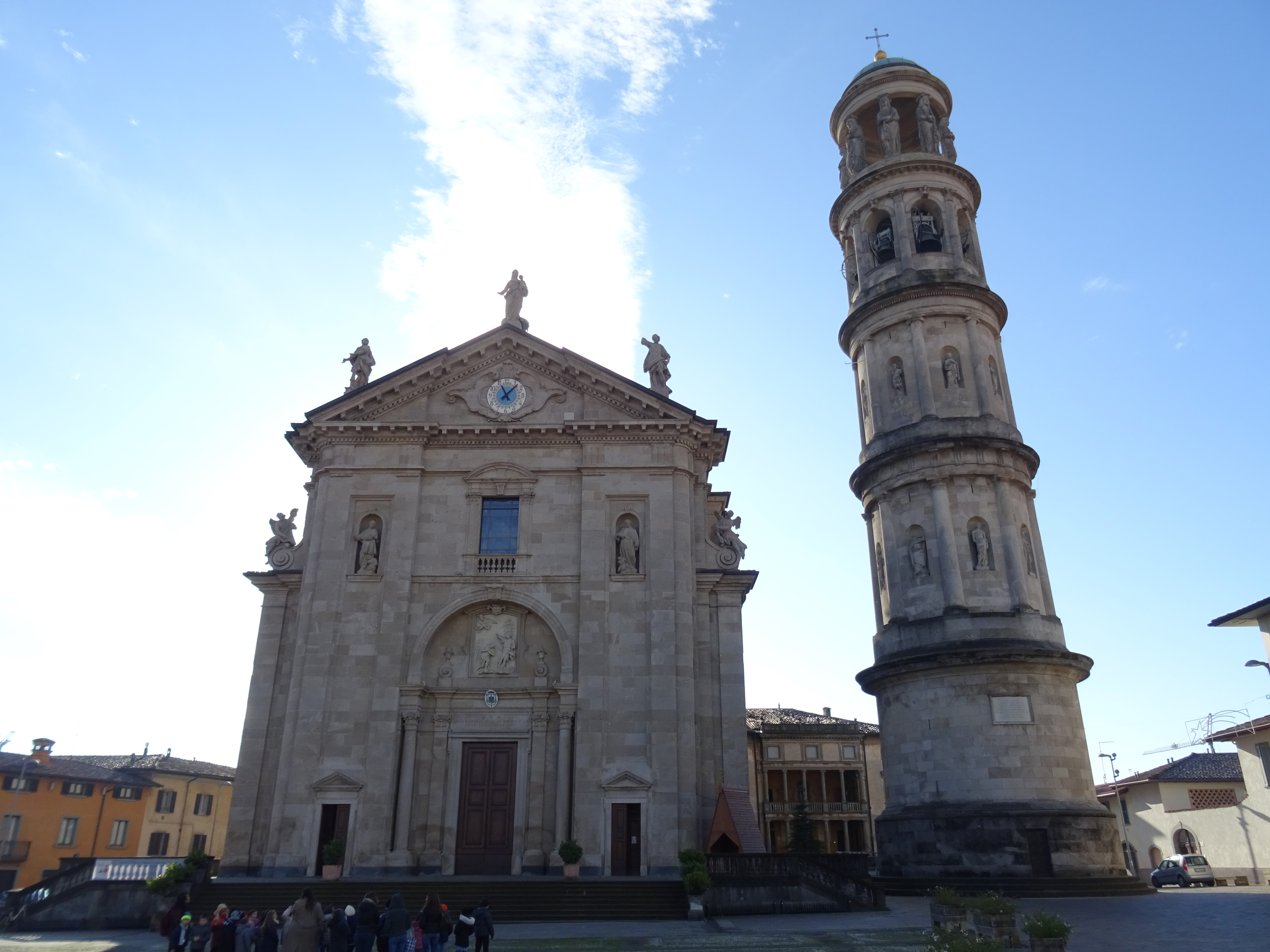
- The Church of Santi Nazario and Celso

- Location within Italy Location within Lombardy
- Coordinates: 45°36′N 9°41′E
- Country: Italy
- Region: Lombardy
- Province: Province of Bergamo (BG)
- Frazioni: Basella

Government
  - Mayor: Filippo Mapelli

Area
  - Total: 14.78 km^{2} (5.71 sq mi)
- Elevation: 173 m (568 ft)

Population (Dec. 2004)
  - Total: 8,704
  - Density: 588.9/km^{2} (1,525/sq mi)
- Demonym: Urgnanesi
- Time zone: UTC+1 (CET)
  - Summer (DST): UTC+2 (CEST)
- Postal code: 24059
- Dialing code: 035
- Website: Official website

Urgnano (Bergamasque: Örgnà) is a comune (municipality) in the Province of Bergamo in the Italian region of Lombardy, located about 45 kilometres (28 mi) northeast of Milan and about 11 kilometres (7 mi) south of Bergamo. As of 31 December 2004, it had a population of 8,704 and an area of 14.0 square kilometres (5.4 mi^{2}).

The municipality of Urgnano contains the frazione (subdivision) Basella. Among the churches in the town are Santissima Trinità and the parish church of Santi Nazario e Celso.

Urgnano borders the following municipalities: Cavernago, Cologno al Serio, Comun Nuovo, Ghisalba, Spirano, Zanica.

== Demographic evolution ==
Historical population

Year	Pop.	±%
1861	3,694	—
1871	3,916	+6.0%
1881	4,037	+3.1%
1901	4,180	+3.5%
1911	4,751	+13.7%
1921	4,907	+3.3%

Year	Pop.	±%
1931	5,243	+6.8%
1936	5,133	−2.1%
1951	5,613	+9.4%
1961	5,861	+4.4%
1971	6,716	+14.6%
1981	7,372	+9.8%

Year	Pop.	±%
1991	7,606	+3.2%
2001	8,445	+11.0%
2011	9,549	+13.1%
2021	9,854	+3.2%

Source: Data from ISTAT
