= Brignano Gera d'Adda =

- Comune
- Comune di Brignano Gera d'Adda
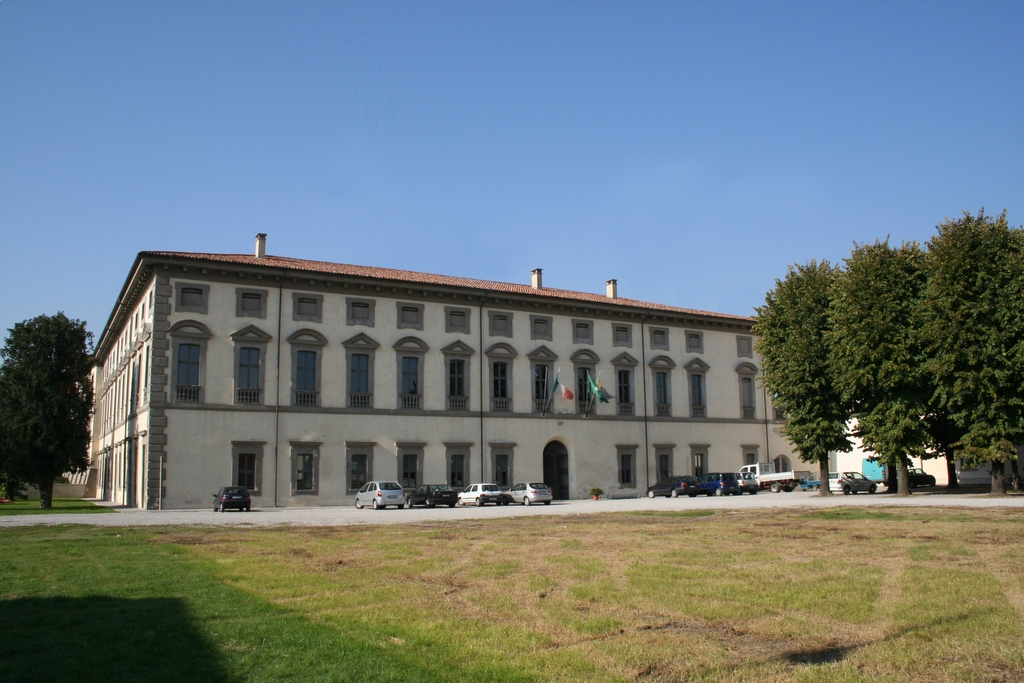
- Palazzo Vecchio.

- Coat of arms

- Location within Italy Location within Lombardy
- Coordinates: 45°32′N 9°38′E
- Country: Italy
- Region: Lombardy
- Province: Bergamo (BG)

Government
  - Mayor: Galli Loris

Area
  - Total: 12.11 km^{2} (4.68 sq mi)
- Elevation: 128 m (420 ft)

Population (31 December 2017)
  - Total: 6,009
  - Density: 496.2/km^{2} (1,285/sq mi)
- Demonym: Brignanesi
- Time zone: UTC+1 (CET)
  - Summer (DST): UTC+2 (CEST)
- Postal code: 24053
- Dialing code: 0363
- Patron saint: St. Bonifacio
- Saint day: First Sunday in October and the successive Monday
- Website: Official website

Brignano Gera d'Adda (Bergamasque: Brignà) is a comune (municipality) in the Province of Bergamo in the Italian region of Lombardy, located about 35 kilometres (22 mi) east of Milan and about 20 kilometres (12 mi) south of Bergamo.

== Main sights ==
The main attraction is the Palazzo Visconti, divided into a Palazzo Vecchio ("Old Palace") and a Palazzo Nuovo ("New Palace"). Originally a defensive castle known from the 10th century, it was rebuilt in the 13th to 17th centuries; it houses frescoes from the Galliari brothers, Mattia Bortoloni and Alessandro Magnasco. The Palazzo Vecchio was the birthplace of Francesco Bernardino Visconti, the Unnamed described by Italian author Alessandro Manzoni in The Betrothed.

The church of Sant'Andrea dates to the 11th century. It has a 15th-century entrance portico.
