= Verdello =

- Comune
- Comune di Verdello
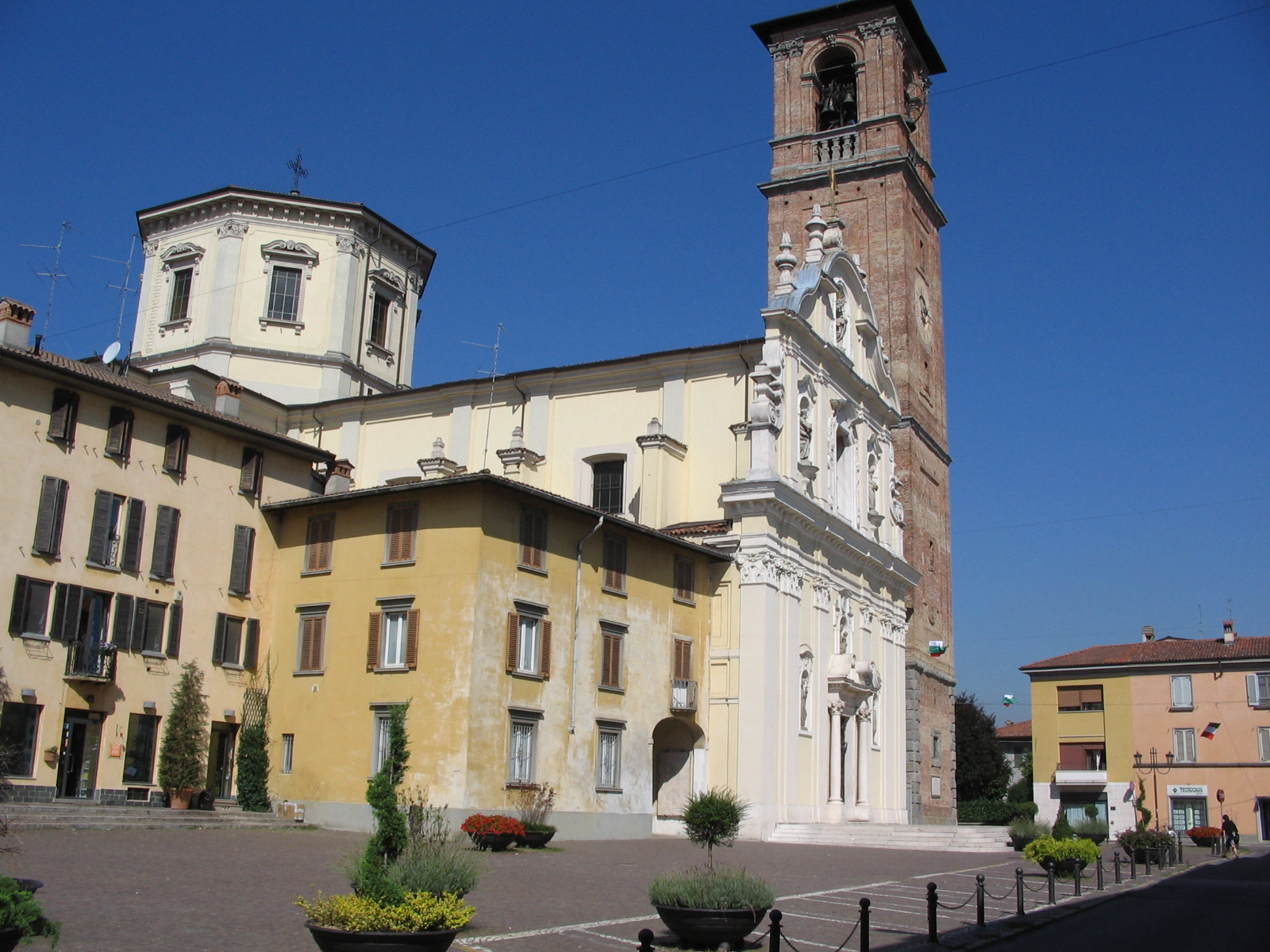
- Church of Apostles Saint Peter and Paul

- Location within Italy Location within Lombardy
- Coordinates: 45°36′N 9°38′E
- Country: Italy
- Region: Lombardy
- Province: Province of Bergamo (BG)

Area
  - Total: 7.15 km^{2} (2.76 sq mi)
- Elevation: 173 m (568 ft)

Population (31 December 2006)
  - Total: 7,497
  - Density: 1,050/km^{2} (2,720/sq mi)
- Demonym: Verdellesi
- Time zone: UTC+1 (CET)
  - Summer (DST): UTC+2 (CEST)
- Postal code: 24049
- Dialing code: 035
- Patron saint: San Pietro e San Paolo
- Saint day: 29 June
- Website: Official website

Verdello (Bergamasque: Erdèl) is a comune in the province of Bergamo, Lombardy, Italy. It has a population of 6,494.

== Twin towns ==
Verdello is twinned with:

- Balaruc-les-Bains, France

== Transportation ==
- Verdello-Dalmine railway station
