= Monte Tesoro =

Mountain in Italy

Coordinates: 45°56′N 11°58′E

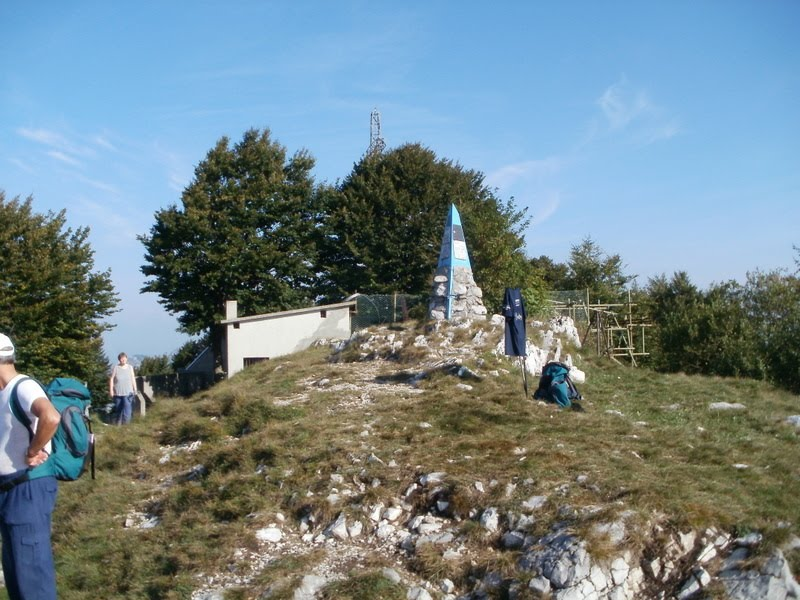
- The shrine at Monte Tesoro.

Highest point
- Elevation: 1,432 m (4,698 ft)

Geography
- Location: Lombardy, Italy
- Parent range: Bergamo Alps

The Monte Tesoro is a summit of the Bergamasque Prealps. It is 1,432 metres above sea level and is located in the municipality of Carenno on the mountain ridge that goes south from the Resegone towards the plains at the hills of Bergamo. It divides the valley of San Martino from the Valle Imagna between the passes of Pertus and Valcava, dividing, therefore the provinces of Lecco and Bergamo.

Its broad summit is easily accessible from several fronts. A road from the Valle Imagna, ends at Forcella Alta, 1,300 m asl, just a 20-minute walk to the top. From the main road at the Valcava pass, by a trail that starts from Combeli at about 1,300 m asl and that reaches the summit along the broad southern ridge. From the San Martino valley the trail starts at Boccio in the town of Carenno, and rises through the vast forests of the western slope. Lastly from Colle di Sogno in the town of Torre de' Busi, the most "alpine" of the trails, however easy, along the sunny south-west slope, almost devoid of tree cover. The summit offers an excellent view, especially over the Adda river valley, on the nearby plains and on the Bergamasque Prealps behind which the Rhaetian Alps can be seen. At the summit, there is a shrine with a 15-metre high metal cross erected in 1985 in memory of Italian soldiers killed in action.

== WebCam ==
The amateur weather station Sopracornola in the village of Calolziocorte has a webcam that shows the Monte Tesoro, and updates the picture every five minutes.
