= Erve =

- Comune
- Comune di Erve
- Location within Italy Location within Lombardy
- Coordinates: 45°49′N 9°27′E
- Country: Italy
- Region: Lombardy
- Province: Province of Lecco (LC)

Area
  - Total: 6.2 km^{2} (2.4 sq mi)

Population (Dec. 2004)
  - Total: 758
  - Density: 120/km^{2} (320/sq mi)
- Demonym: Ervesi
- Time zone: UTC+1 (CET)
  - Summer (DST): UTC+2 (CEST)
- Postal code: 23805
- Dialing code: 0341
- Website: Official website

Erve (locally Valderf') is a comune (municipality) in the Province of Lecco in the Italian region Lombardy, located about 45 kilometres (28 mi) northeast of Milan and about 5 kilometres (3 mi) southeast of Lecco. As of 31 December 2004, it had a population of 758 and an area of 6.2 square kilometres (2.4 mi^{2}).

Erve borders the following municipalities: Brumano, Calolziocorte, Carenno, Lecco, Valsecca and Vercurago.

== Demographic evolution ==
Historical population

Year	Pop.	±%
1861	548	—
1871	614	+12.0%
1881	652	+6.2%
1901	750	+15.0%
1911	843	+12.4%

Year	Pop.	±%
1921	846	+0.4%
1931	926	+9.5%
1936	801	−13.5%
1951	866	+8.1%
1961	840	−3.0%

Year	Pop.	±%
1971	771	−8.2%
1981	661	−14.3%
1991	693	+4.8%
2001	735	+6.1%

Source: Data from ISTAT
