= Monte Marenzo =

- Comune
- Comune di Monte Marenzo
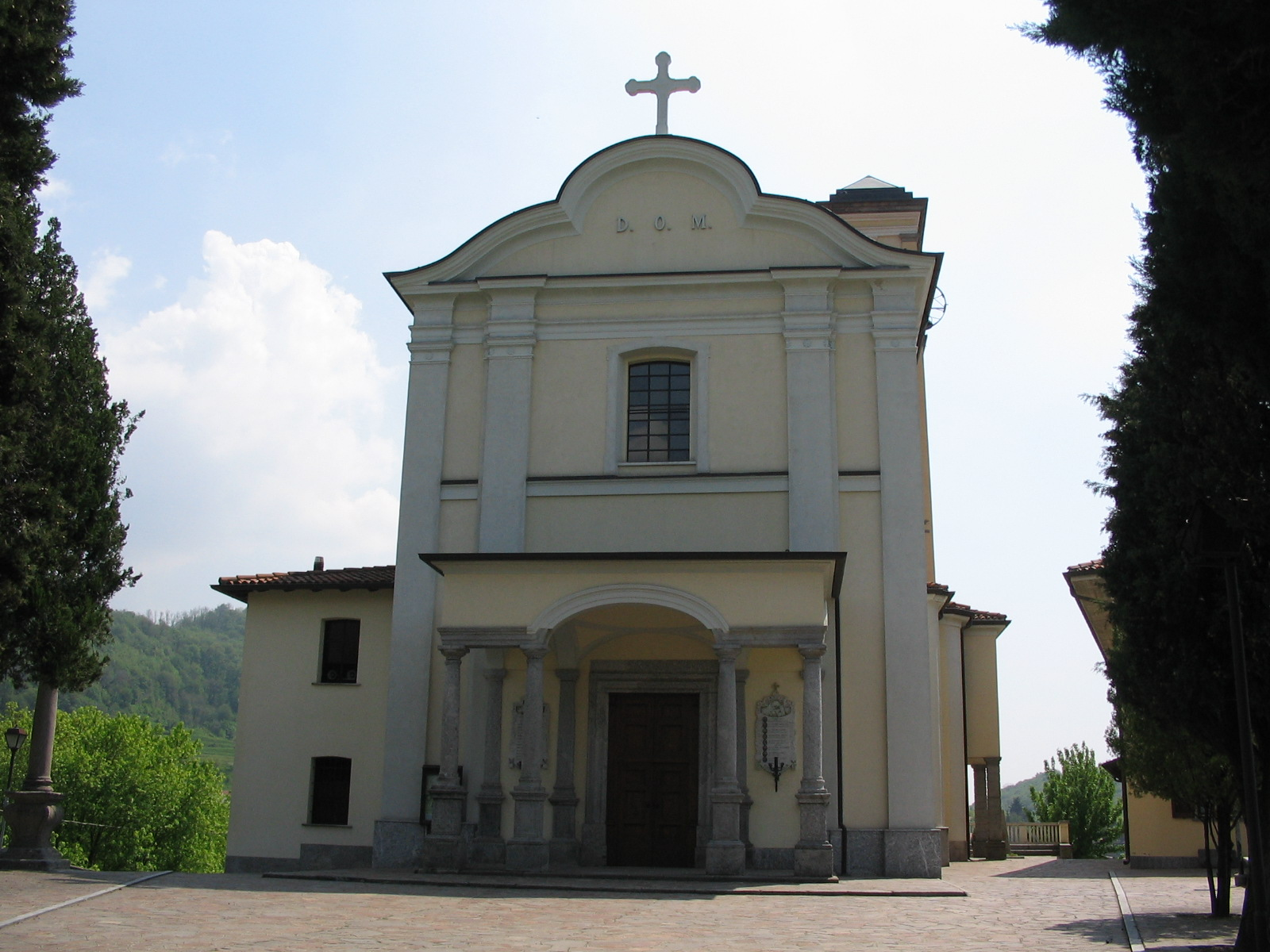
- Monte Marenzo

- Location within Italy Location within Lombardy
- Coordinates: 45°46′N 9°27′E
- Country: Italy
- Region: Lombardy
- Province: Lecco (LC)

Government
  - Mayor: Paola Colombo

Area
  - Total: 3.0 km^{2} (1.2 sq mi)
- Elevation: 440 m (1,440 ft)

Population (1994)
  - Total: 31 December 2,010
  - Density: 10/km^{2} (27/sq mi)
- Demonym: Montemarenzini
- Time zone: UTC+1 (CET)
  - Summer (DST): UTC+2 (CEST)
- Postal code: 24030
- Dialing code: 0341
- Patron saint: St. Paul
- Saint day: 25 January
- Website: Official website

Monte Marenzo is a comune (municipality) in the Province of Lecco in the Italian region Lombardy, located about 40 kilometres (25 mi) northeast of Milan and about 10 kilometres (6 mi) southeast of Lecco. Monte Marenzo borders the following municipalities: Brivio, Calolziocorte, Cisano Bergamasco, Torre de' Busi.
