= Schatzberg (disambiguation) =

Schatzberg (German for "treasure mountain") may refer to:

- The Schatzberg, a 6,000 ft mountain in the Alps in Austria.

Surnames:

- Jerry Schatzberg
- Steve Schatzberg

== See also ==
- Treasure Mountain (disambiguation)
