= Caprino Bergamasco =

- Comune
- Comune di Caprino Bergamasco
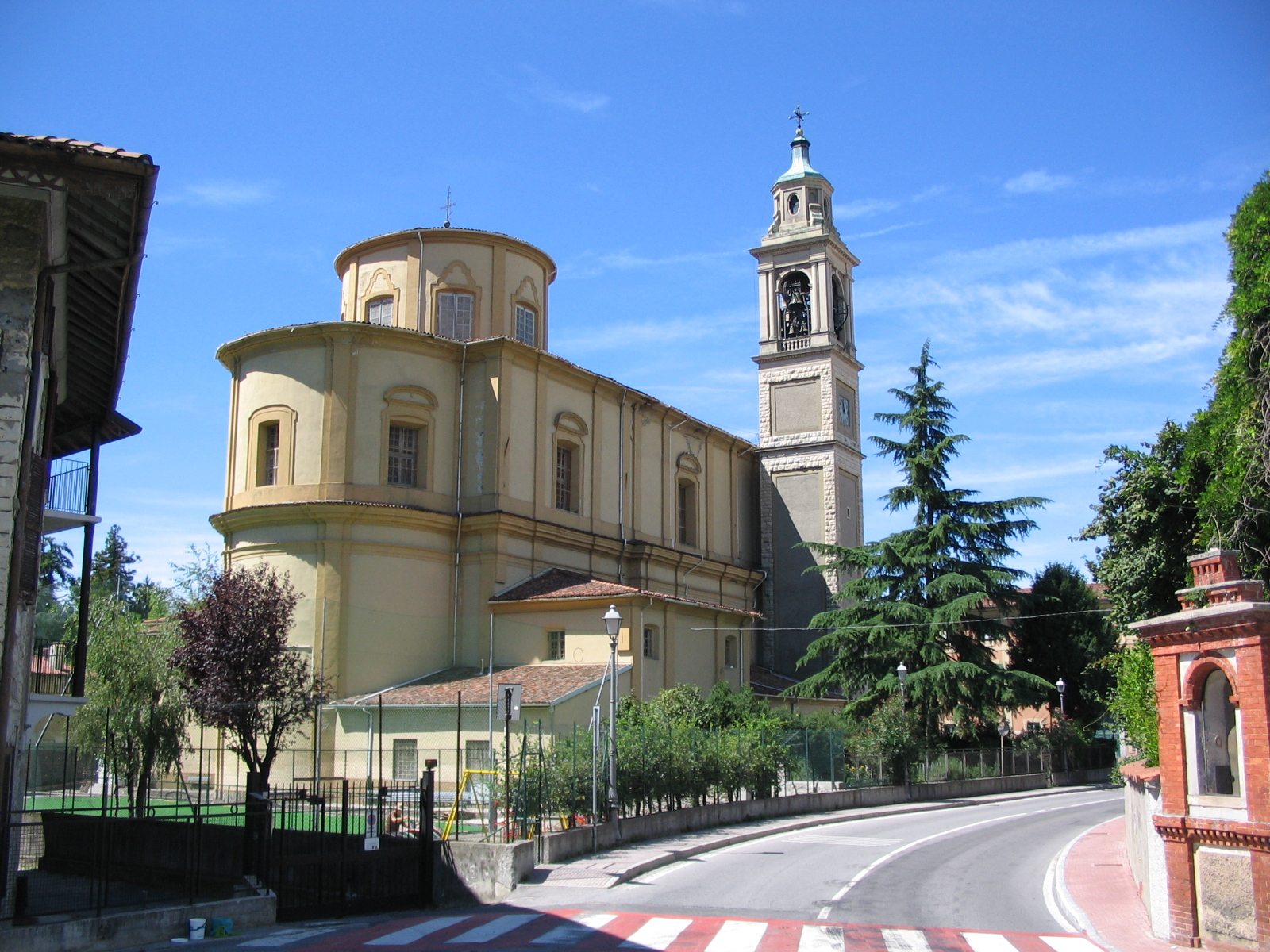
- Church

- Coat of arms

- Location within Italy Location within Lombardy
- Coordinates: 45°45′N 9°29′E
- Country: Italy
- Region: Lombardy
- Province: Province of Bergamo (BG)
- Frazioni: Sant'Antonio d'Adda, Celana, Opreno, Perlupario, Formorone, Ombria, (Prato)

Area
  - Total: 8.6 km^{2} (3.3 sq mi)
- Elevation: 315 m (1,033 ft)

Population (Dec. 2004)
  - Total: 2,908
  - Density: 340/km^{2} (880/sq mi)
- Demonym: Caprinesi
- Time zone: UTC+1 (CET)
  - Summer (DST): UTC+2 (CEST)
- Postal code: 24030
- Dialing code: 035
- Website: Official website

Caprino Bergamasco (Bergamasque: Cavrì) is a comune (municipality) in the Province of Bergamo in the Italian region of Lombardy, located about 40 kilometres (25 mi) northeast of Milan and about 15 kilometres (9 mi) northwest of Bergamo. As of 31 December 2004, it had a population of 2,908 and an area of 8.6 square kilometres (3.3 mi^{2}).

The municipality of Caprino Bergamasco contains the frazioni (subdivisions, mainly villages and hamlets) Sant'Antonio d'Adda, Celana, Opreno, Perlupario, Formorone and Ombria.

Caprino Bergamasco borders the following municipalities: Cisano Bergamasco, Palazzago, Pontida, Roncola, Torre de' Busi.

== Opera connection ==
The village was home to a hotel for artists run by librettist Antonio Ghislanzoni in the 1880s. Fellow librettist Ferdinando Fontana was a frequent visitor. It was in Caprino Bergamasco that Fontana wrote the libretto for Giacomo Puccini's opera Edgar.

== Demographic evolution ==
Historical population

Year	Pop.	±%
1861	2,083	—
1871	2,313	+11.0%
1881	2,289	−1.0%
1901	2,311	+1.0%
1911	2,426	+5.0%

Year	Pop.	±%
1921	2,495	+2.8%
1931	2,476	−0.8%
1936	2,386	−3.6%
1951	2,550	+6.9%
1961	2,368	−7.1%

Year	Pop.	±%
1971	2,161	−8.7%
1981	2,549	+18.0%
1991	2,675	+4.9%
2001	2,823	+5.5%

Source: Data from ISTAT
