= Sant'Omobono Terme =

Sant’Omobono Terme
- Comune
- Comune di Sant’Omobono Terme
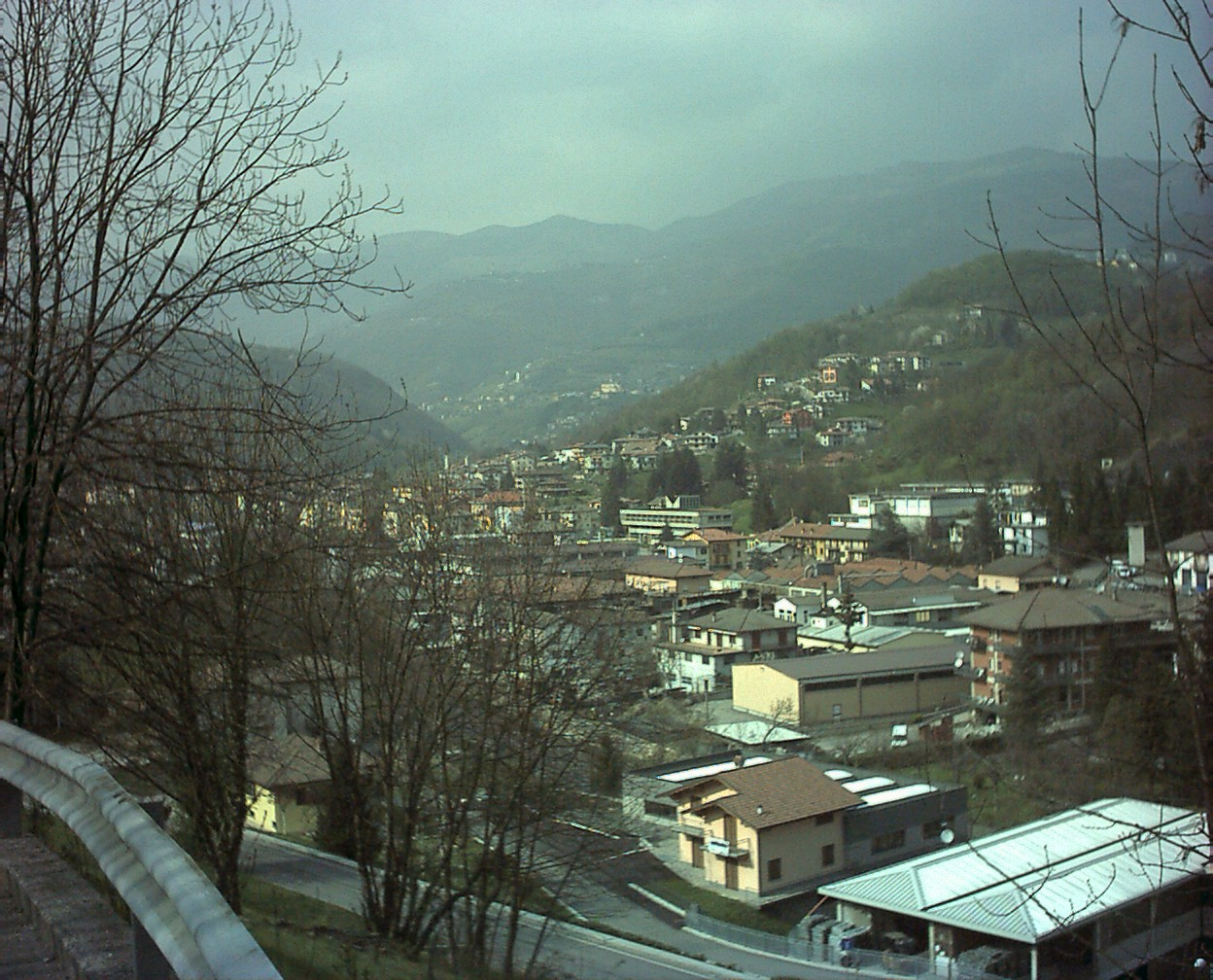
- Sant'Omobono Terme

- Location within Italy Location within Lombardy
- Coordinates: 45°49′N 9°32′E
- Country: Italy
- Region: Lombardy
- Province: Bergamo (BG)
- Frazioni: Cepino, Mazzoleni, Selino Alto, Selino Basso (communal seat), Valsecca

Government
  - Mayor: Manzoni Sauro Ivo

Area
  - Total: 10.8 km^{2} (4.2 sq mi)
- Elevation: 427 m (1,401 ft)

Population (31 January 2014)
  - Total: 3,978
  - Density: 368/km^{2} (954/sq mi)
- Demonym: Santomobonesi
- Time zone: UTC+1 (CET)
  - Summer (DST): UTC+2 (CEST)
- Postal code: 24038
- Dialing code: 035

Sant'Omobono Terme (previously Sant'Omobono Imagna; Bergamasque: Sant' Imbù) is a comune (municipality) in the Province of Bergamo in the Italian region of Lombardy, located about 50 kilometres (31 mi) northeast of Milan and about 15 kilometres (9 mi) northwest of Bergamo.

Sant' Omobono Imagna borders the following municipalities: Bedulita, Berbenno, Brembilla, Corna Imagna, Costa Valle Imagna, Roncola, Rota d'Imagna. The former commune of Valsecca was merged with Sant'Omobono in 2014.

== Origins of the name ==
The toponym originates from the patron saint of the fraction of Mazzoleni, which composes the commune together with Cepino, Selino Alto, Selino Basso, and Valsecca.

The commune of Sant'Omobono Imagna was constituted in 1927 with the aggregation of the communes of Mazzoleni and Falghera, Cepino and Selino. Thanks to a regional law of August 2004, the name was changed from Sant'Omobono Imagna to Sant'Omobono Terme.

== Gallery ==
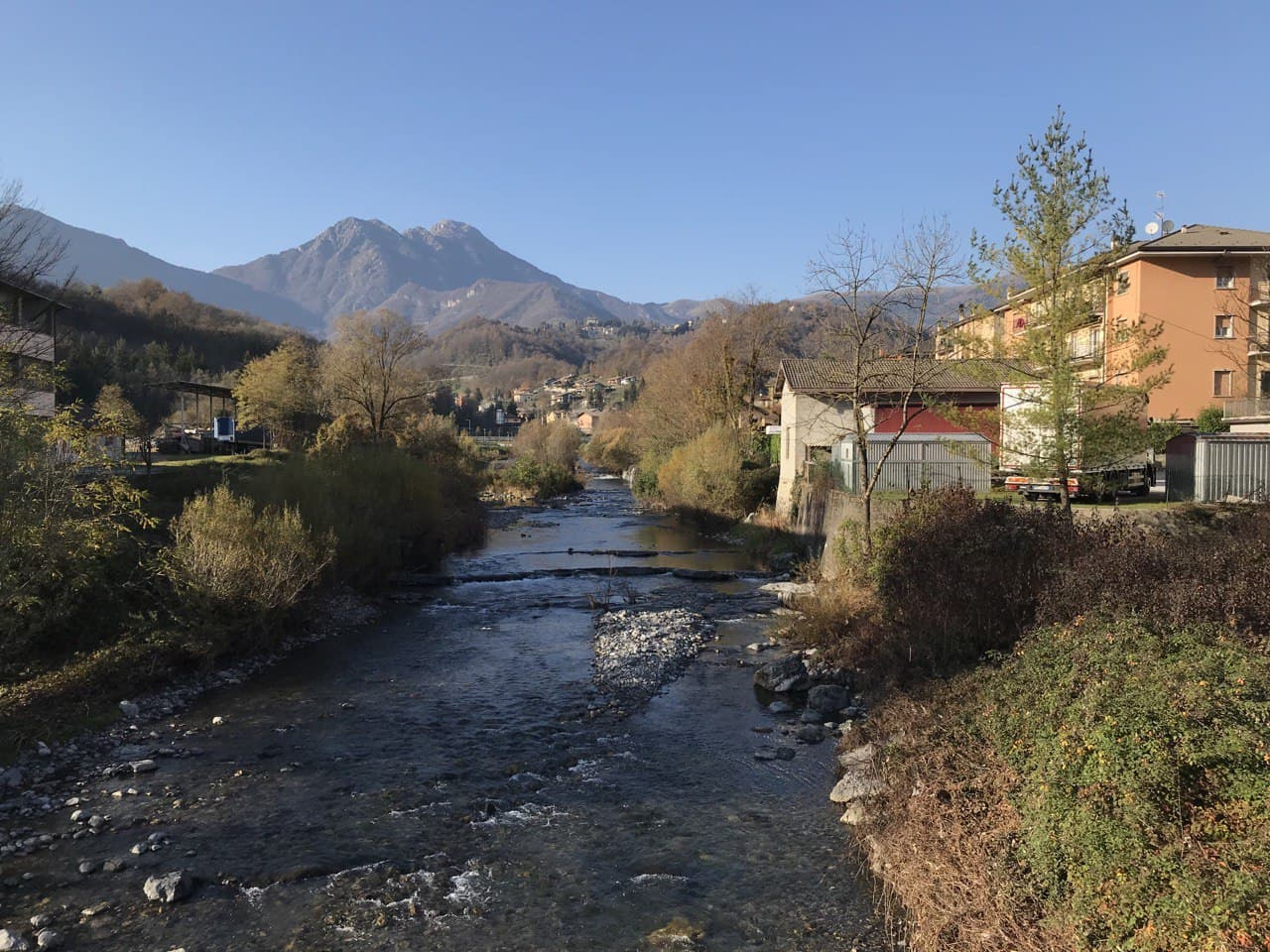
Autumn in Sant'Omobono Terme

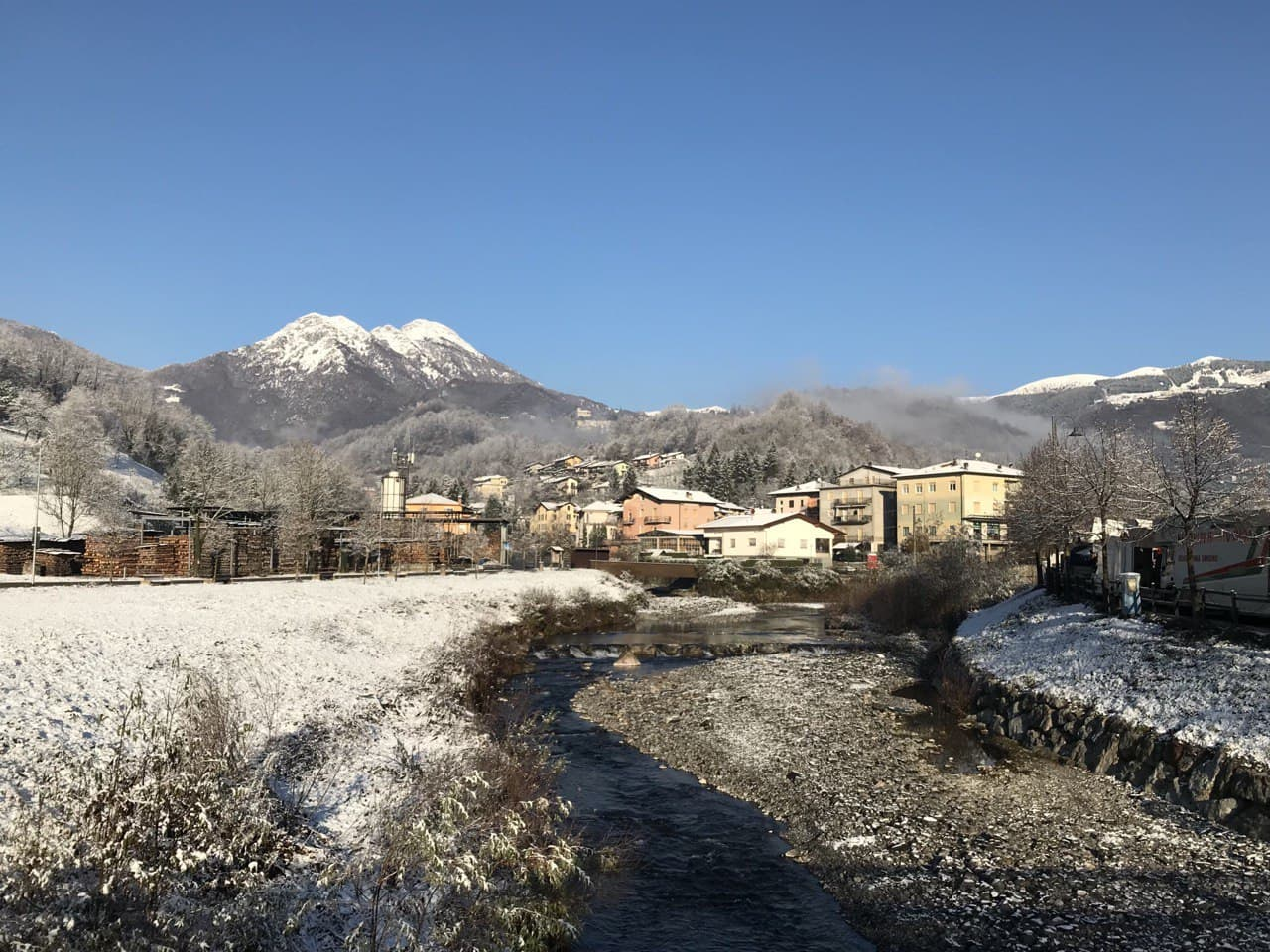
Sant'Omobono Terme, Winter
