= Bedulita =

- Comune
- Comune di Bedulita
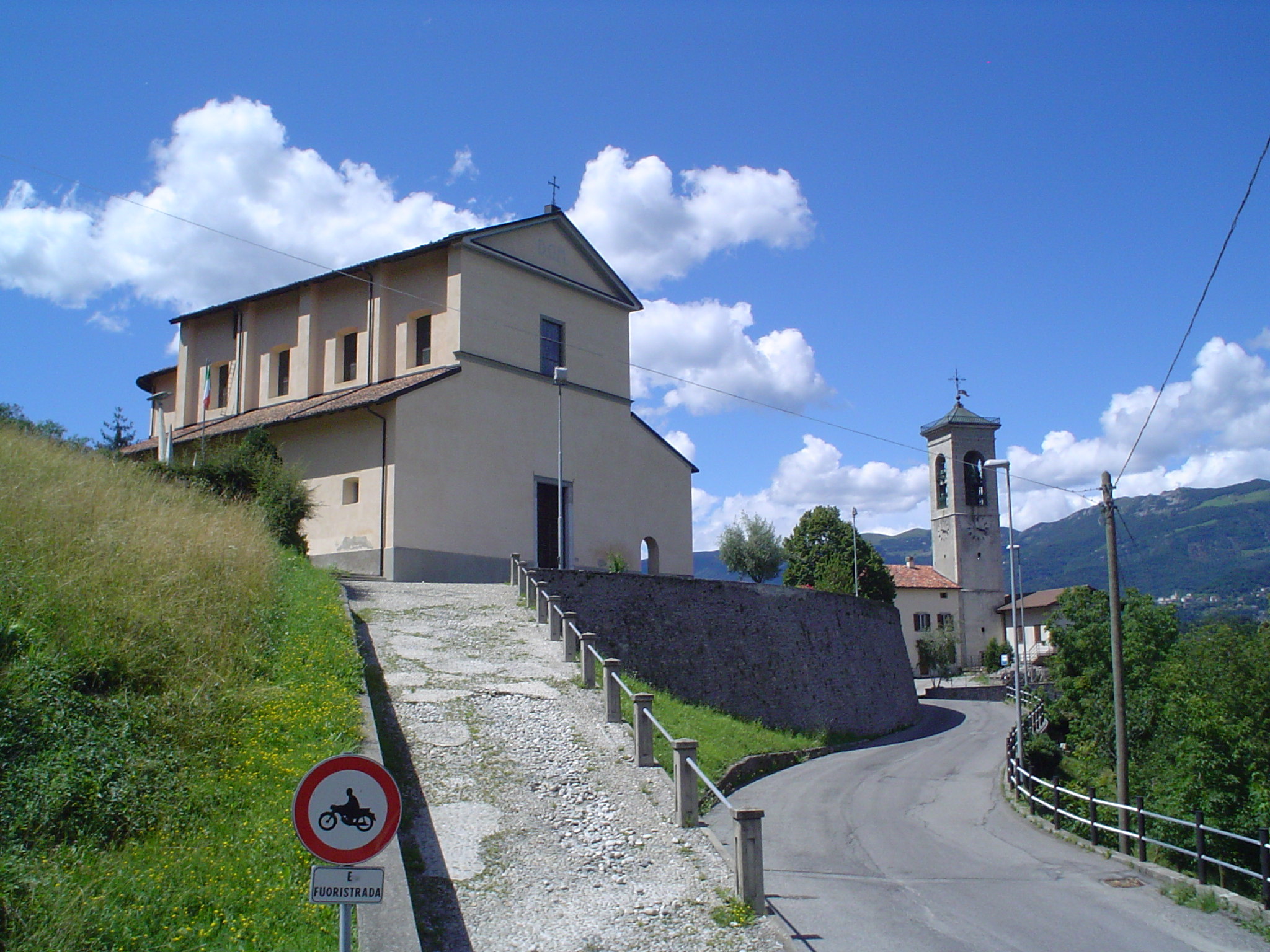
- View of Bedulita

- Coat of arms

- Location within Italy Location within Lombardy
- Coordinates: 45°47′N 9°33′E
- Country: Italy
- Region: Lombardy
- Province: Bergamo (BG)

Government
  - Mayor: Roberto Facchinetti

Area
  - Total: 4.1 km^{2} (1.6 sq mi)
- Elevation: 600 m (2,000 ft)

Population (31 December 2010)
  - Total: 734
  - Density: 180/km^{2} (460/sq mi)
- Demonym: Bedulitesi
- Time zone: UTC+1 (CET)
  - Summer (DST): UTC+2 (CEST)
- Postal code: 24030
- Dialing code: 035

Bedulita (Bergamasque: Bedülida) is a comune (municipality) in the Province of Bergamo in the Italian region of Lombardy, located about 45 kilometres (28 mi) northeast of Milan and about 13 kilometres (8 mi) northwest of Bergamo.

Bedulita borders the following municipalities: Berbenno, Capizzone, Costa Valle Imagna, Roncola, Sant'Omobono Imagna.
