= Palazzago =

- Comune
- Comune di Palazzago
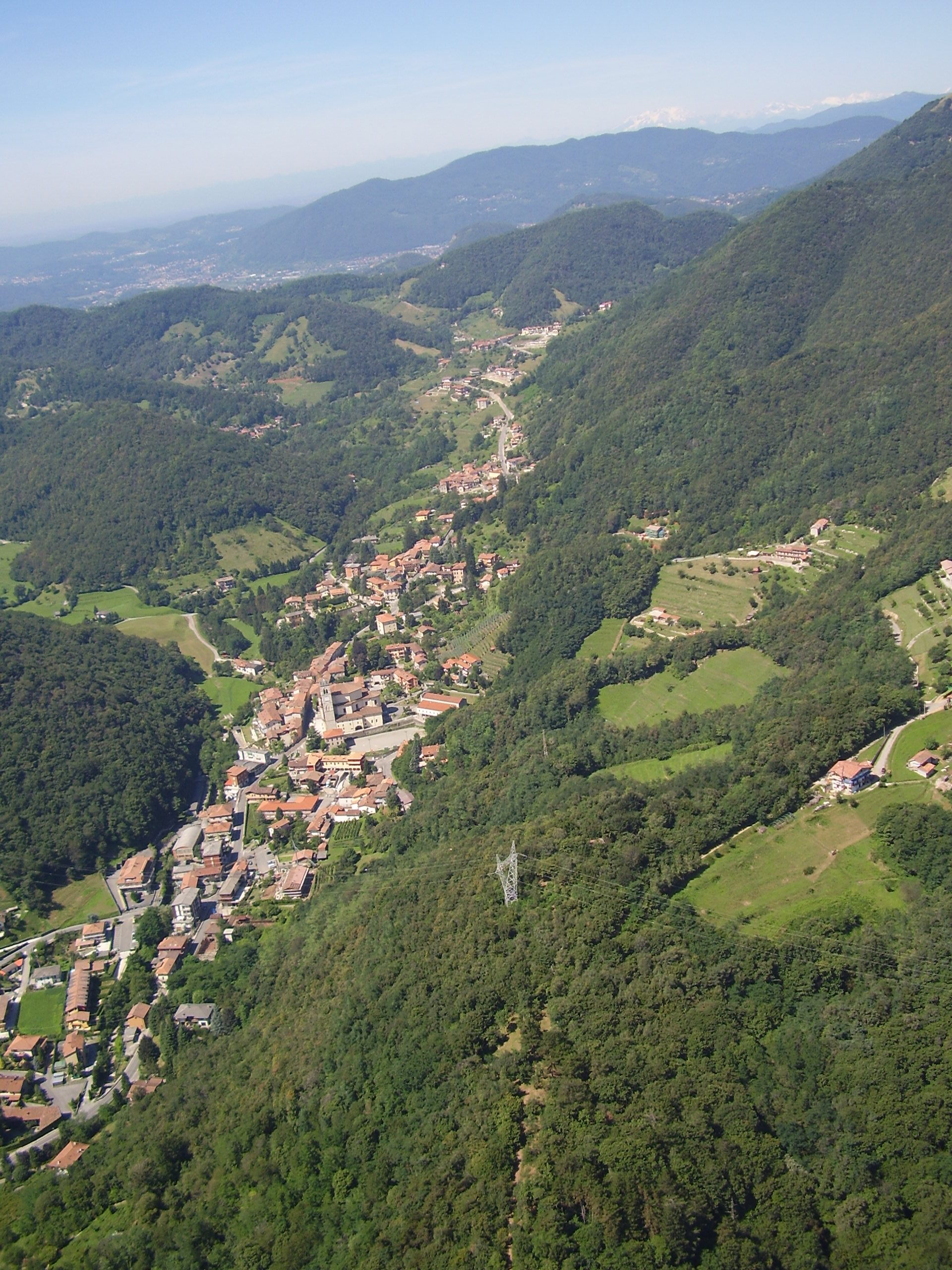
- Palazzago

- Location within Italy Location within Lombardy
- Coordinates: 45°45′N 9°32′E
- Country: Italy
- Region: Lombardy
- Province: Province of Bergamo (BG)

Area
  - Total: 14.0 km^{2} (5.4 sq mi)
- Elevation: 397 m (1,302 ft)

Population (Dec. 2004)
  - Total: 3,658
  - Density: 261/km^{2} (677/sq mi)
- Demonym: Palazzaghesi
- Time zone: UTC+1 (CET)
  - Summer (DST): UTC+2 (CEST)
- Postal code: 24030
- Dialing code: 035

Palazzago (Bergamasque: Palasàch) is a comune (municipality) in the Province of Bergamo in the Italian region of Lombardy, located about 45 kilometres (28 mi) northeast of Milan and about 12 kilometres (7 mi) northwest of Bergamo. As of 31 December 2004, it had a population of 3,658 and an area of 14.0 square kilometres (5.4 mi^{2}).

Palazzago borders the following municipalities: Almenno San Bartolomeo, Ambivere, Barzana, Caprino Bergamasco, Mapello, Pontida, Roncola.

== Demographic evolution ==
Historical population

Year	Pop.	±%
1861	1,781	—
1871	1,921	+7.9%
1881	2,034	+5.9%
1901	2,063	+1.4%
1911	2,374	+15.1%

Year	Pop.	±%
1921	2,634	+11.0%
1931	2,590	−1.7%
1936	2,477	−4.4%
1951	2,646	+6.8%
1961	2,564	−3.1%

Year	Pop.	±%
1971	2,496	−2.7%
1981	2,826	+13.2%
1991	3,081	+9.0%
2001	3,610	+17.2%

Source: Data from ISTAT
