= Barzana =

- Comune
- Comune di Barzana
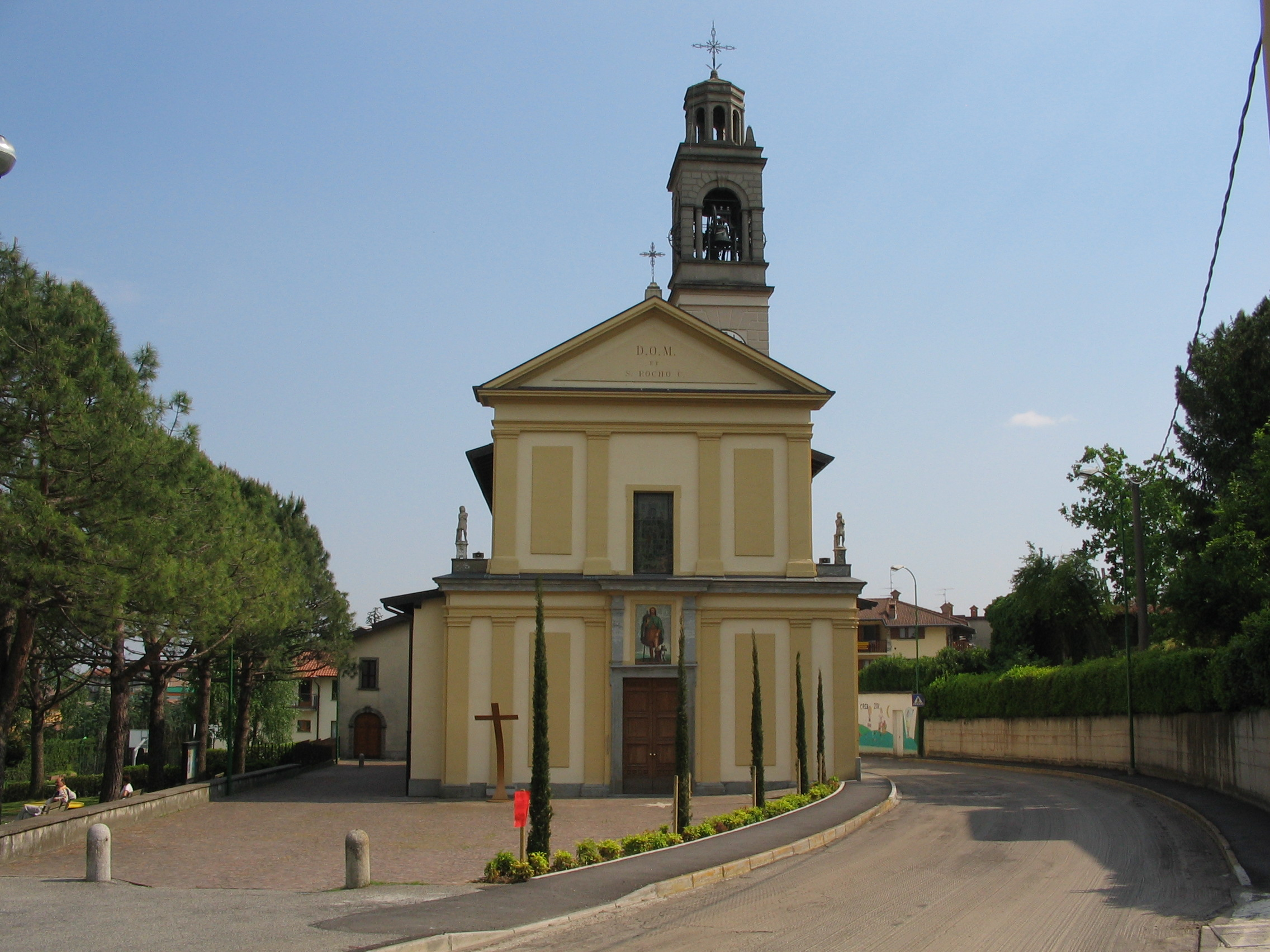
- San Rocco Church

- Coat of arms

- Location within Italy Location within Lombardy
- Coordinates: 45°44′N 9°34′E
- Country: Italy
- Region: Lombardy
- Province: Province of Bergamo (BG)

Area
  - Total: 2.1 km^{2} (0.81 sq mi)
- Elevation: 300 m (980 ft)

Population (Dec. 2004)
  - Total: 1,645
  - Density: 780/km^{2} (2,000/sq mi)
- Demonym: Barzanesi
- Time zone: UTC+1 (CET)
  - Summer (DST): UTC+2 (CEST)
- Postal code: 24030
- Dialing code: 035

Barzana (Bergamasque: Barsana) is a comune (municipality) in the Province of Bergamo in the Italian region of Lombardy, located about 45 kilometres (28 mi) northeast of Milan and about 9 kilometres (6 mi) northwest of Bergamo. As of 31 December 2004, it had a population of 1,645 and an area of 2.1 square kilometres (0.81 mi^{2}).

Barzana borders the following municipalities: Almenno San Bartolomeo, Brembate di Sopra, Mapello, Palazzago.

== Demographic evolution ==
Historical population

| Year | Pop. | ±% |
|---|---|---|
| 1861 | 414 | — |
| 1871 | 523 | +26.3% |
| 1881 | 411 | −21.4% |
| 1901 | 488 | +18.7% |
| 1911 | 581 | +19.1% |

| Year | Pop. | ±% |
|---|---|---|
| 1921 | 647 | +11.4% |
| 1931 | 620 | −4.2% |
| 1936 | 643 | +3.7% |
| 1951 | 624 | −3.0% |
| 1961 | 717 | +14.9% |

| Year | Pop. | ±% |
|---|---|---|
| 1971 | 908 | +26.6% |
| 1981 | 975 | +7.4% |
| 1991 | 1,066 | +9.3% |
| 2001 | 1,562 | +46.5% |

Source: Data from ISTAT
