= Ambivere =

- Comune
- Comune di Ambivere
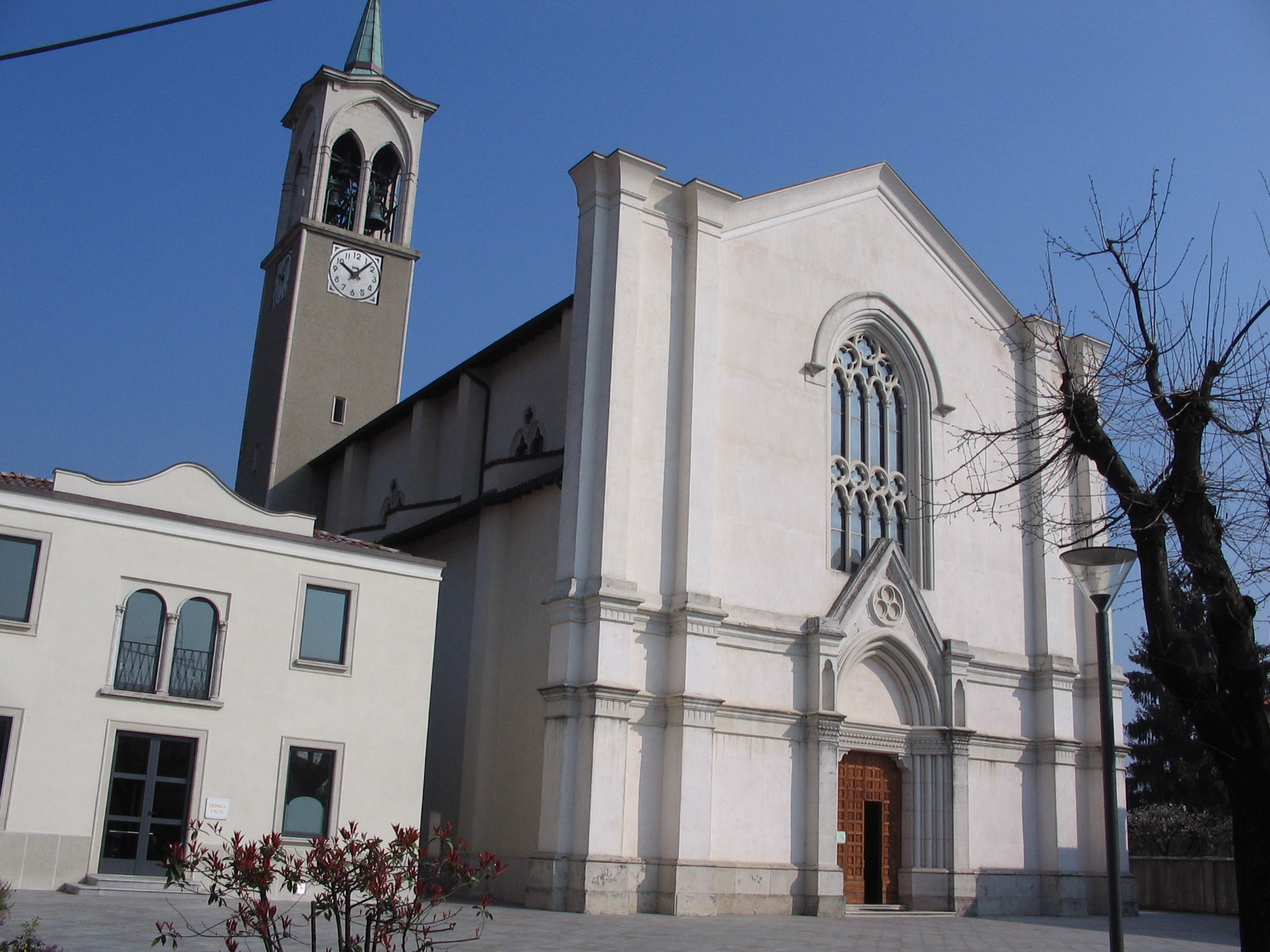
- The church of St. Zeno in Ambivere

- Coat of arms

- Location of Ambivere in Italy Ambivere (Lombardy)
- Coordinates: 45°43′N 9°33′E
- Country: Italy
- Region: Lombardy
- Province: Province of Bergamo (BG)

Government
  - Mayor: Vittorio Leoni

Area
  - Total: 3.2 km^{2} (1.2 sq mi)
- Elevation: 261 m (856 ft)

Population (Dec. 2004)
  - Total: 2,265
  - Density: 710/km^{2} (1,800/sq mi)
- Demonym: Ambiveresi
- Time zone: UTC+1 (CET)
  - Summer (DST): UTC+2 (CEST)
- Postal code: 24030
- Dialing code: 035
- Patron saint: Beata Vergine del Castello
- Saint day: Second Sunday in September
- Website: Official website

Ambivere (Bergamasque: Ambìer) is a comune (municipality) in the Province of Bergamo in the Italian region of Lombardy, located about 40 kilometres (25 mi) northeast of Milan and about 9 kilometres (6 mi) west of Bergamo. As of 31 December 2004, it had a population of 2,265 and an area of 3.2 square kilometres (1.2 mi^{2}).

Ambivere borders the following municipalities: Mapello, Palazzago, Pontida, Sotto il Monte Giovanni XXIII.

== Demographic evolution ==
Historical population

Year	Pop.	±%
1861	772	—
1871	798	+3.4%
1881	777	−2.6%
1901	769	−1.0%
1911	887	+15.3%

Year	Pop.	±%
1921	1,020	+15.0%
1931	1,009	−1.1%
1936	1,037	+2.8%
1951	1,169	+12.7%
1961	1,353	+15.7%

Year	Pop.	±%
1971	1,623	+20.0%
1981	1,751	+7.9%
1991	2,052	+17.2%
2001	2,250	+9.6%

Source: Data from ISTAT
