= Roncola =

- Comune
- Comune di Roncola
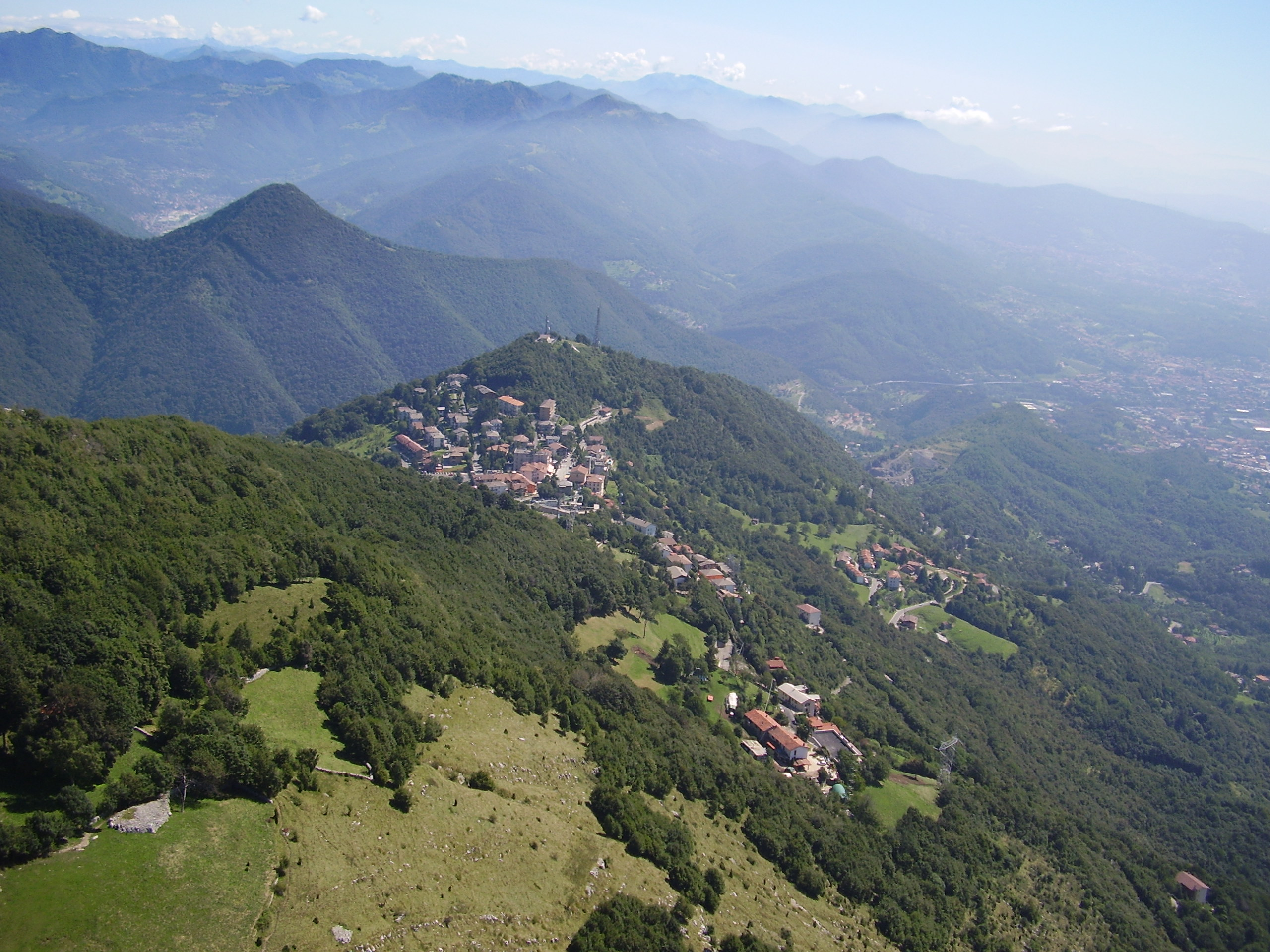
- Roncola

- Location within Italy Location within Lombardy
- Coordinates: 45°46′N 9°33′E
- Country: Italy
- Region: Lombardy
- Province: Bergamo (BG)

Government
  - Mayor: Marcellino Rota

Area
  - Total: 5.1 km^{2} (2.0 sq mi)
- Elevation: 854 m (2,802 ft)

Population (31 December 2011)
  - Total: 754
  - Density: 150/km^{2} (380/sq mi)
- Demonym: Roncolesi
- Time zone: UTC+1 (CET)
  - Summer (DST): UTC+2 (CEST)
- Postal code: 24030
- Dialing code: 035

Roncola (Bergamasque: Róncola) is a comune (municipality) in the Province of Bergamo in the Italian region of Lombardy, located about 45 kilometres (28 mi) northeast of Milan and about 12 kilometres (7 mi) northwest of Bergamo.

Roncola borders the following municipalities: Almenno San Bartolomeo, Bedulita, Capizzone, Caprino Bergamasco, Costa Valle Imagna, Palazzago, Sant'Omobono Terme, Strozza, Torre de' Busi.
