= Berbenno =

- Comune
- Comune di Berbenno
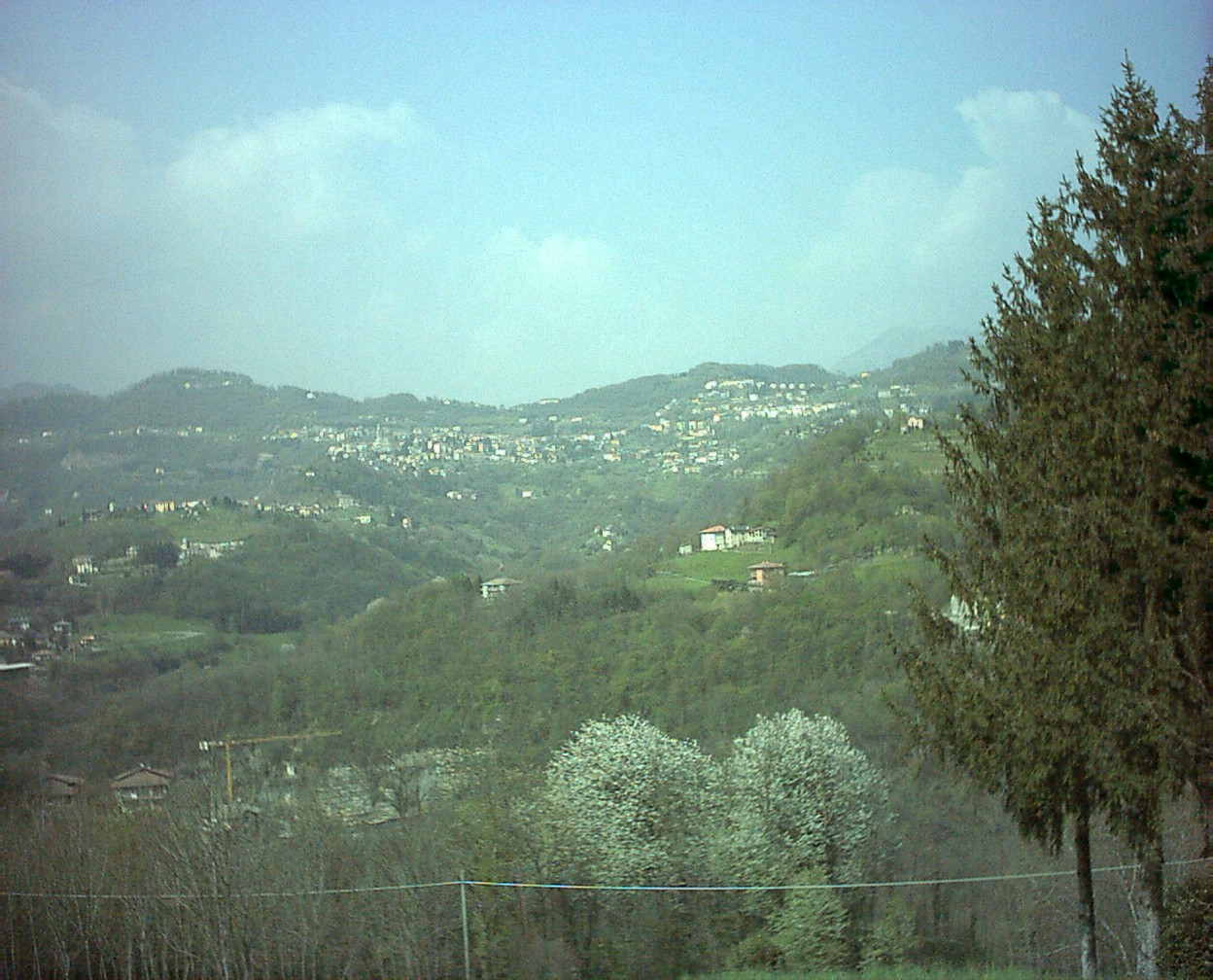
- View of Berbenno

- Location within Italy Location within Lombardy
- Coordinates: 45°49′N 9°34′E
- Country: Italy
- Region: Lombardy
- Province: Bergamo (BG)

Government
  - Mayor: Claudio Salvi

Area
  - Total: 6.3 km^{2} (2.4 sq mi)
- Elevation: 675 m (2,215 ft)

Population (31 December 2010)
  - Total: 2,492
  - Density: 400/km^{2} (1,000/sq mi)
- Demonym: Berbennesi
- Time zone: UTC+1 (CET)
  - Summer (DST): UTC+2 (CEST)
- Postal code: 24030
- Dialing code: 035
- Website: Official website

Berbenno (Bergamasque: Berbèn) is a comune (municipality) in the Province of Bergamo in the Italian region of Lombardy, located about 50 kilometres (31 mi) northeast of Milan and about 15 kilometres (9 mi) northwest of Bergamo.

Berbenno borders the following municipalities: Bedulita, Brembilla, Capizzone, Sant'Omobono Terme.

== Twin towns ==
Berbenno is twinned with:

- Saint-Laurent-du-Pont, France, since 1985
