= Almenno San Bartolomeo =

- Comune
- Comune di Almenno San Bartolomeo
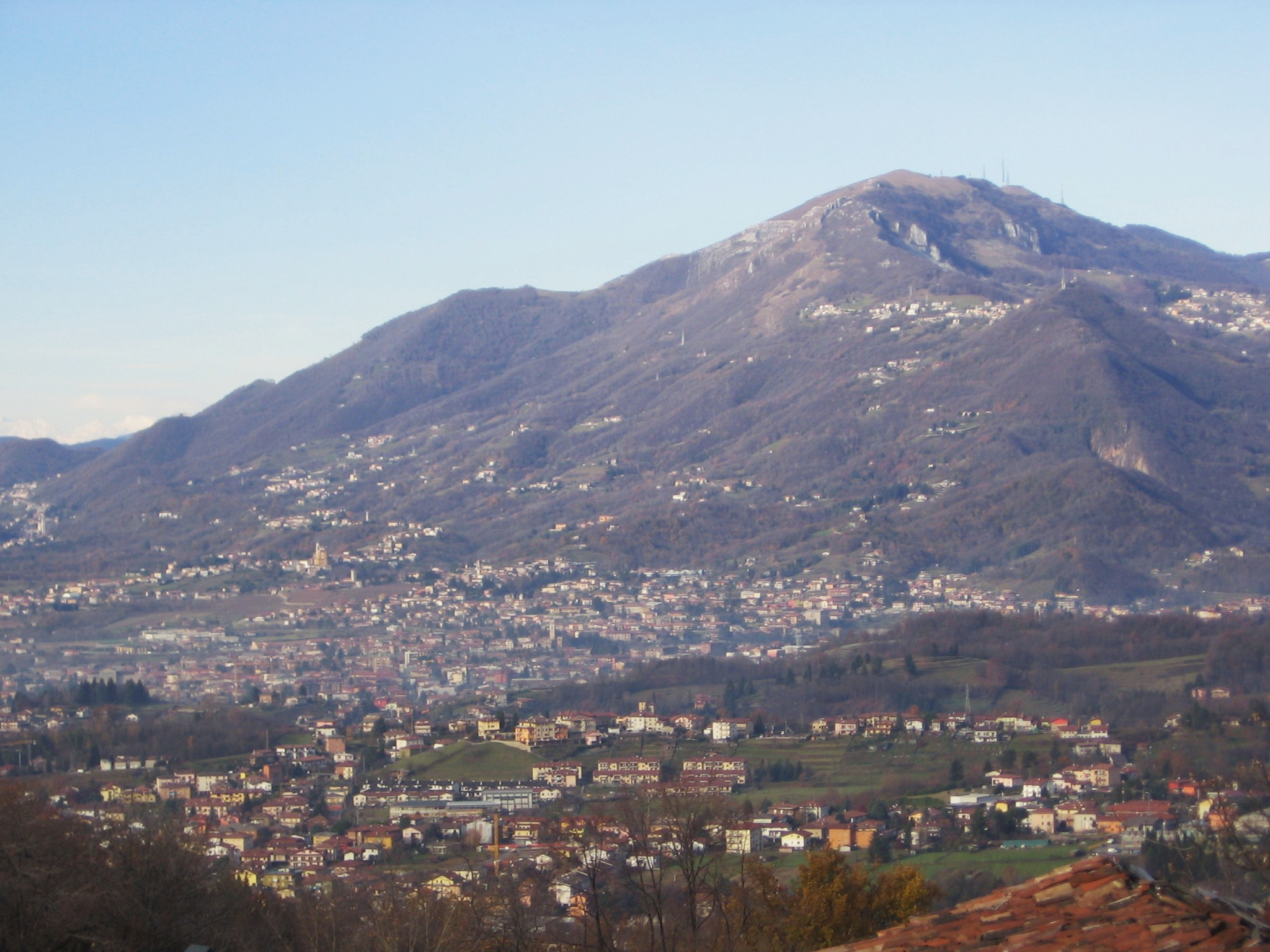
- View of Almenno San Bartolomeo

- Coat of arms

- Location of Almenno San Bartolomeo in Italy Almenno San Bartolomeo (Lombardy)
- Coordinates: 45°45′N 9°35′E
- Country: Italy
- Region: Lombardy
- Province: Bergamo (BG)

Government
  - Mayor: Alessandro Frigeni

Area
  - Total: 10.61 km^{2} (4.10 sq mi)
- Elevation: 352 m (1,155 ft)

Population (31 May 2021)
  - Total: 6,461
  - Density: 609.0/km^{2} (1,577/sq mi)
- Demonym: Almennesi
- Time zone: UTC+1 (CET)
  - Summer (DST): UTC+2 (CEST)
- Postal code: 24030
- Dialing code: 035
- Patron saint: St. Bartholomew and St. Timothy
- Saint day: August 24 and January 26
- Website: Official website

Almenno San Bartolomeo (Bergamasque: Almèn San Bartolomé or simply San Bartolomé) is a comune (municipality) in the Province of Bergamo in the Italian region Lombardy, located about 45 kilometres (28 mi) northeast of Milan and about 9 kilometres (6 mi) northwest of Bergamo.

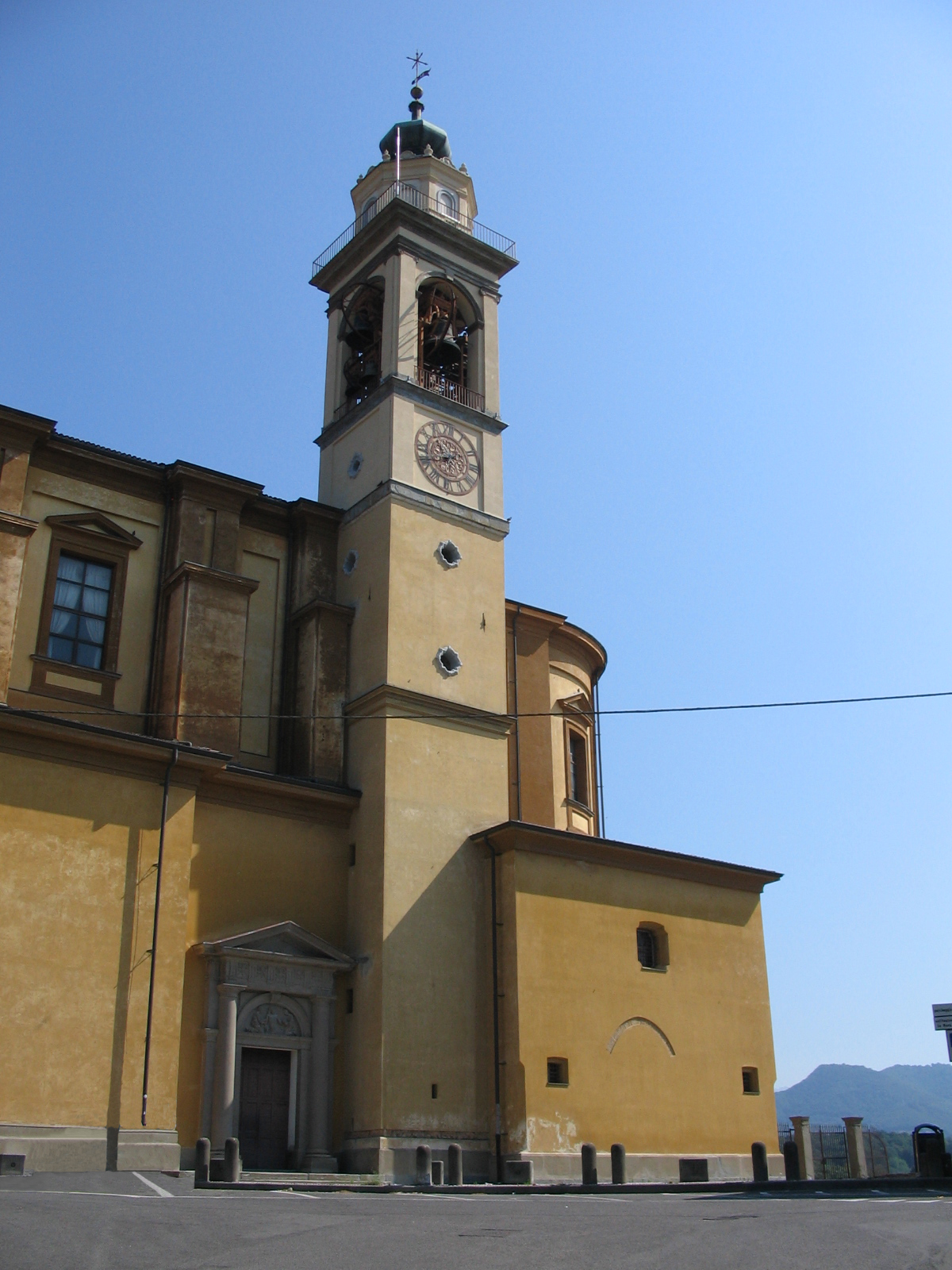
The church of San Bartolomeo di Tremozia

Almenno San Bartolomeo borders the following municipalities: Almè, Almenno San Salvatore, Barzana, Brembate di Sopra, Paladina, Palazzago, Roncola, Strozza, Valbrembo.

The main sight is the Rotonda of San Tomè.
