= Capizzone =

- Comune
- Comune di Capizzone
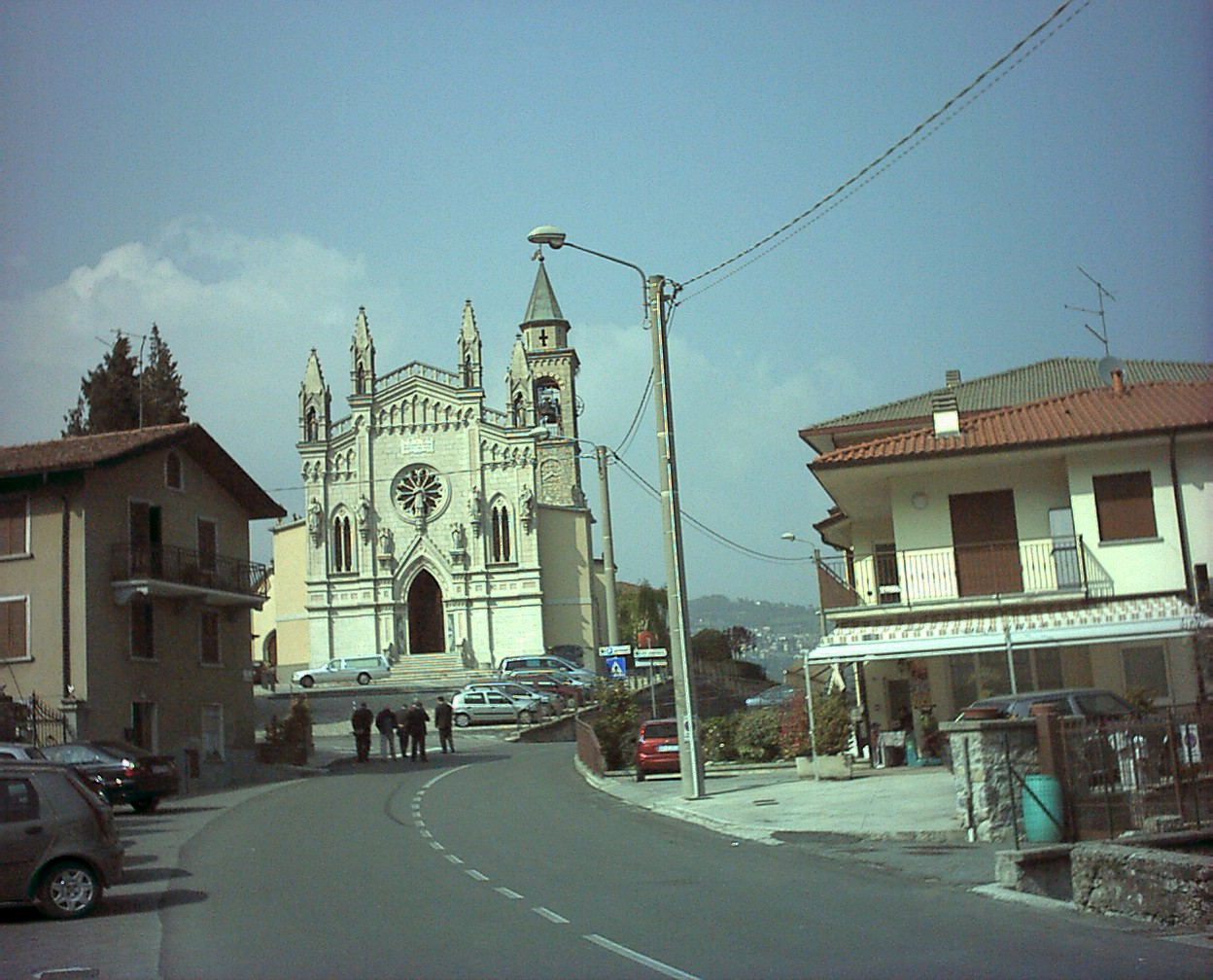
- Capizzone

- Coat of arms

- Location within Italy Location within Lombardy
- Coordinates: 45°47′08″N 9°34′00″E
- Country: Italy
- Region: Lombardy
- Province: Bergamo (BG)
- Frazioni: Cabasso, Cabignone, Caroli, Gallo, Medega, Capalio, Mortesina, La Grate, Piazza, Bagnago, Camoneomone, Caschiettino

Government
  - Mayor: Uberto Pellegrini

Area
  - Total: 4.6 km^{2} (1.8 sq mi)
- Elevation: 454 m (1,490 ft)

Population (31 December 2010)
  - Total: 1,347
  - Density: 290/km^{2} (760/sq mi)
- Demonym: Capizzonesi
- Time zone: UTC+1 (CET)
  - Summer (DST): UTC+2 (CEST)
- Postal code: 24030
- Dialing code: 035

Capizzone (Bergamasque: Capizzù) is a comune (municipality) in the Province of Bergamo in the Italian region of Lombardy, located about 45 kilometres (28 mi) northeast of Milan and about 12 kilometres (7 mi) northwest of Bergamo.

Capizzone borders the following municipalities: Bedulita, Berbenno, Brembilla, Roncola, Strozza, Ubiale Clanezzo.
