= Ubiale Clanezzo =

- Comune
- Comune di Ubiale Clanezzo
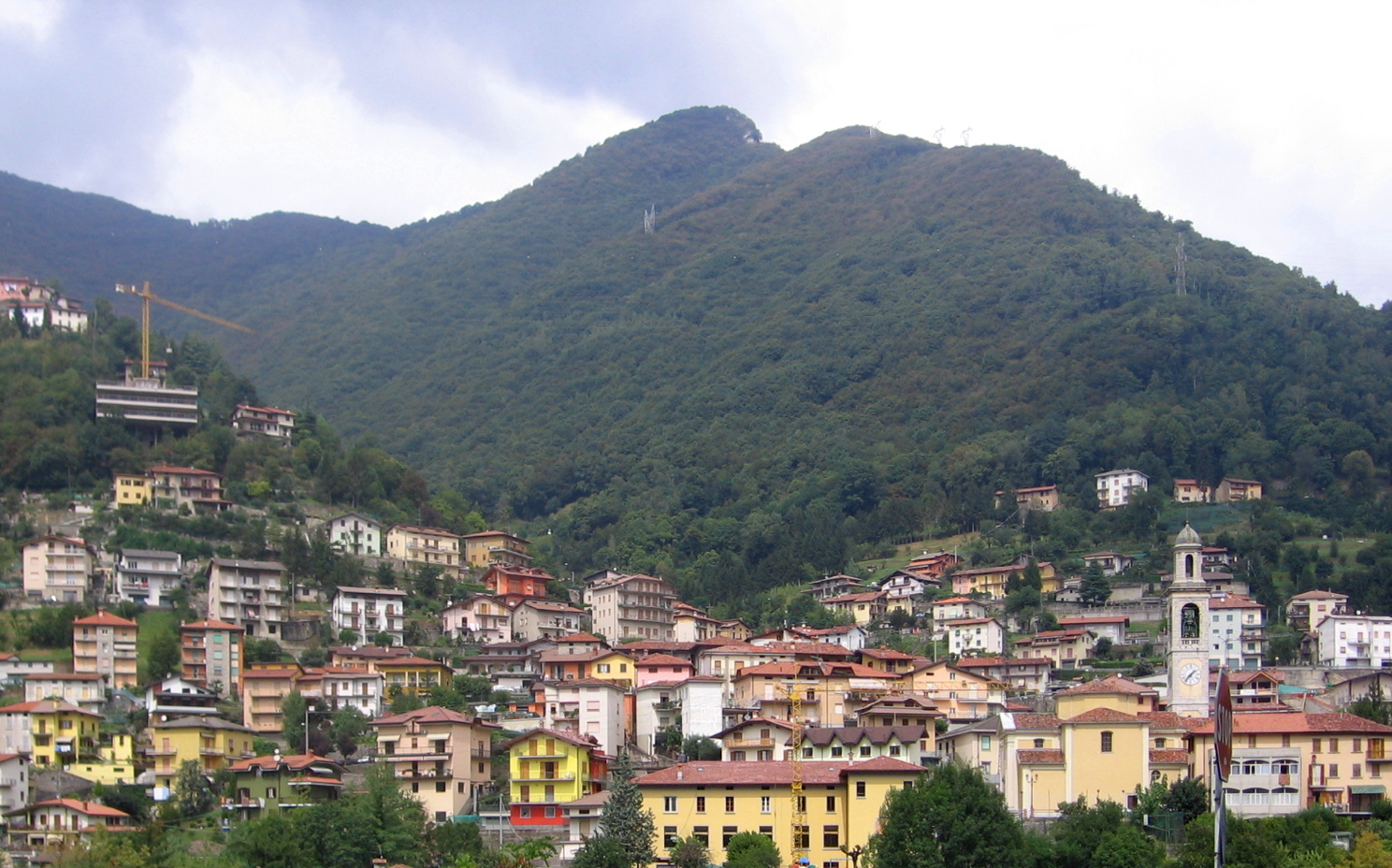
- Ubiale Clanezzo

- Coat of arms

- Location within Italy Location within Lombardy
- Coordinates: 45°47′N 9°37′E
- Country: Italy
- Region: Lombardy
- Province: Bergamo (BG)
- Frazioni: Clanezzo

Government
  - Mayor: Ersilio Gotti

Area
  - Total: 7.3 km^{2} (2.8 sq mi)
- Elevation: 336 m (1,102 ft)

Population (31 December 2010)
  - Total: 1,395
  - Density: 190/km^{2} (490/sq mi)
- Demonym: Ubialesi
- Time zone: UTC+1 (CET)
  - Summer (DST): UTC+2 (CEST)
- Postal code: 24010
- Dialing code: 0345

Ubiale Clanezzo (Bergamasque: Übiàl Clenèss) is a comune (municipality) in the Province of Bergamo in the Italian region of Lombardy, located about 50 kilometres (31 mi) northeast of Milan and about 10 kilometres (6 mi) northwest of Bergamo.

Ubiale Clanezzo borders the following municipalities: Almenno San Salvatore, Brembilla, Capizzone, Sedrina, Strozza, Villa d'Almè. Sights include the castle (rebuilt in the 18th century) and the Bridge of Attone, which spans the Imagna torrent.

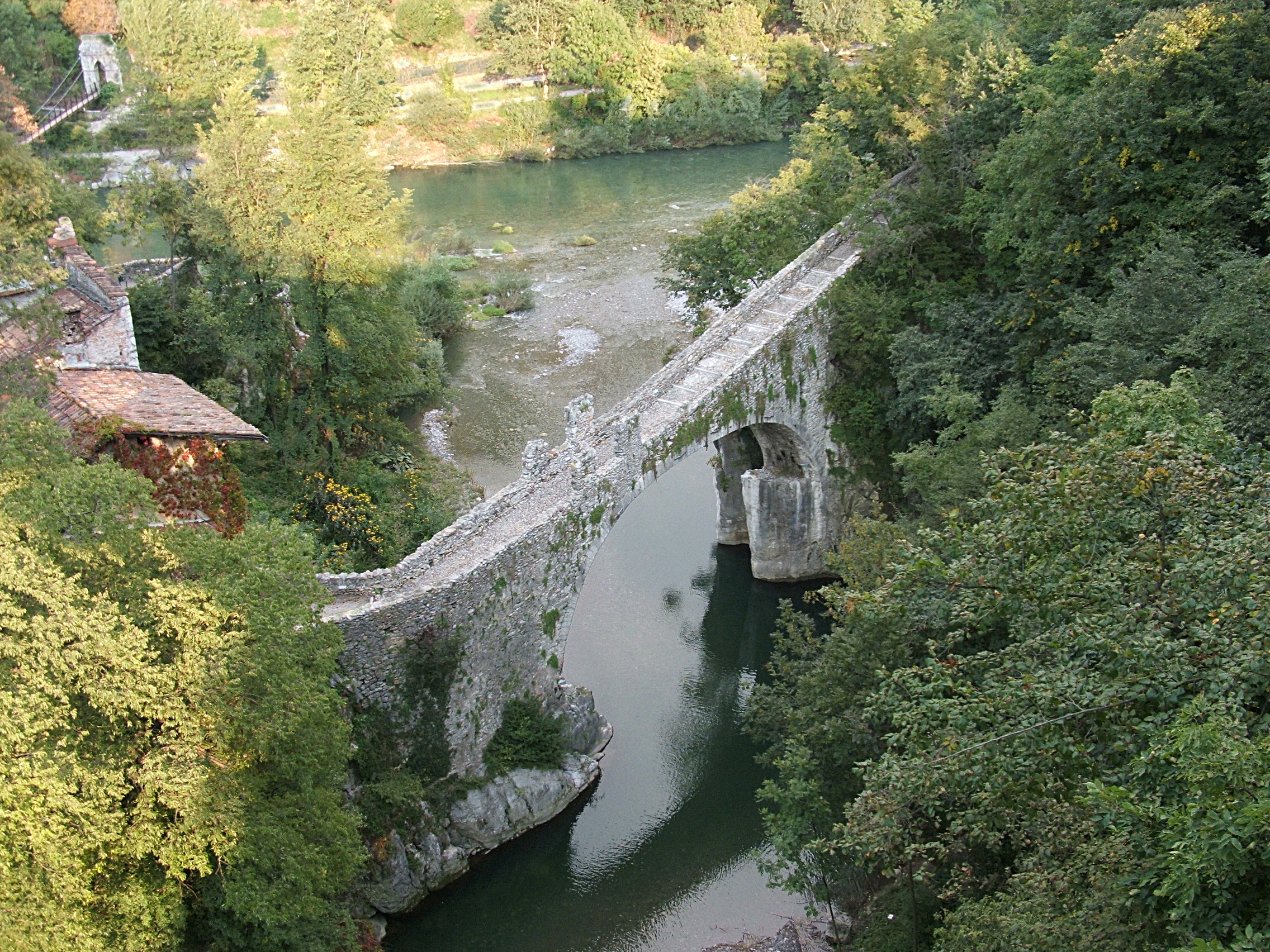
the bridge di Attone
