= Brembate di Sopra =

- Comune
- Comune di Brembate di Sopra
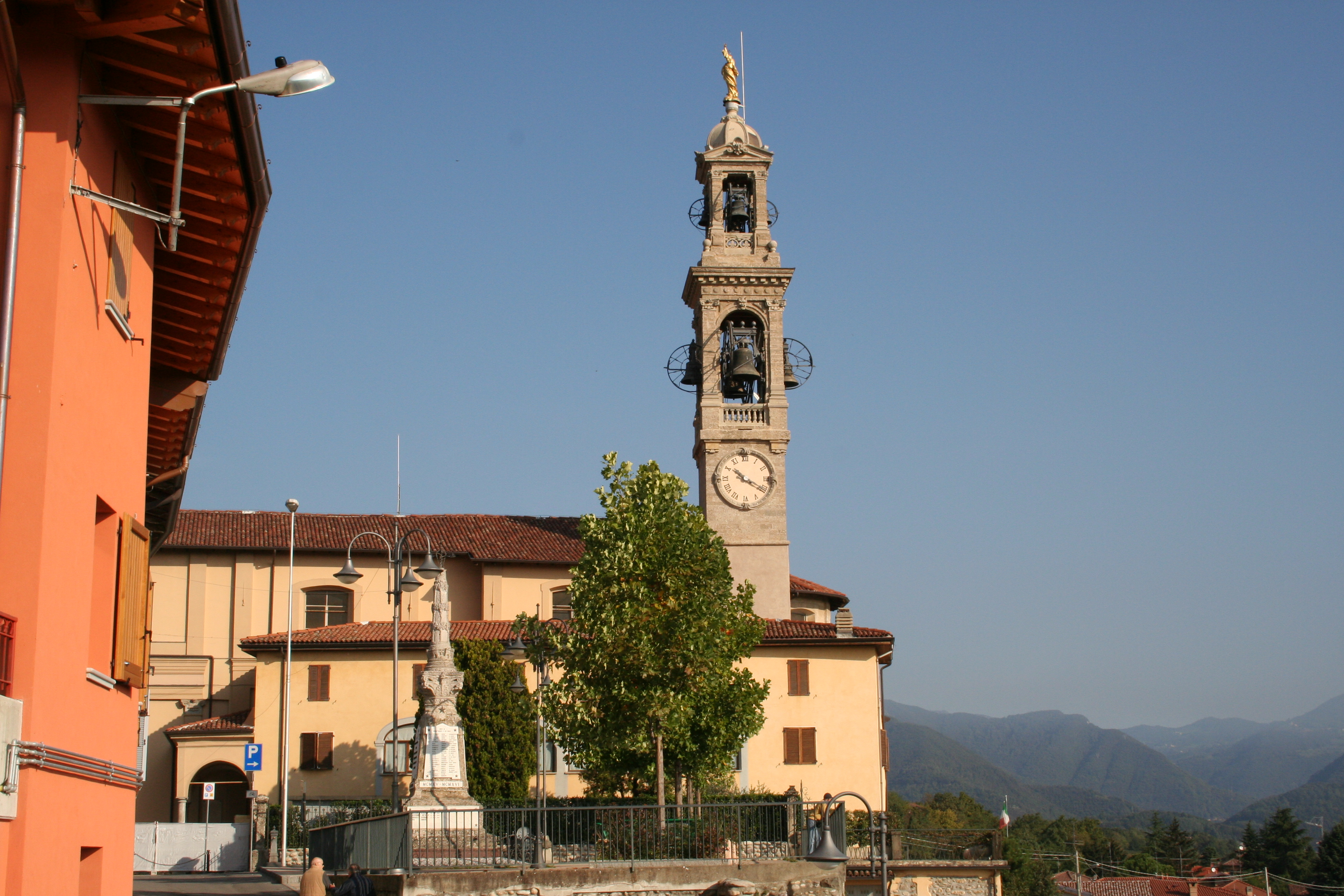
- Church in Brembate di Sopra

- Coat of arms

- Location within Italy Location within Lombardy
- Coordinates: 45°43′N 9°35′E
- Country: Italy
- Region: Lombardy
- Province: Bergamo (BG)

Government
  - Mayor: Emiliana Giussani

Area
  - Total: 4.3 km^{2} (1.7 sq mi)
- Elevation: 267 m (876 ft)

Population (31 May 2021)
  - Total: 7,906
  - Density: 1,800/km^{2} (4,800/sq mi)
- Demonym: Brembatesi
- Time zone: UTC+1 (CET)
  - Summer (DST): UTC+2 (CEST)
- Postal code: 24030
- Dialing code: 035

Brembate di Sopra (Bergamasque: Brembàt Sura) is a comune (municipality) in the Province of Bergamo in the Italian region of Lombardy, located about 45 kilometres (28 miles) northeast of Milan and about 7 km (4 mi) northwest of Bergamo. As of 31 December 2004, it had a population of 7,190 and an area of 4.3 square kilometres (2 square miles).

Brembate di Sopra borders the following municipalities: Almenno San Bartolomeo, Barzana, Mapello, Ponte San Pietro, Valbrembo.

== History ==
The first urbanization here was the work of the Romans, mindful of the strategic importance of the nearby road connecting Bergamo to Como. Archeological finds have confirmed the existence of Roman military camps in the area.

The region was subsequently dominated by the Lombards who included it within the Duchy of Bergamo. The district is often included as part of Lemine during this period.

The earliest written records of Brembate date back to 856. The village, which takes its name from its proximity to the river Brembo, began to be referred to as 'Brembate di Sopra' (Upper Brembate) to distinguish it from Brembate di Sotto (now known simply as Brembate) to the south.

In 2010, Brembate di Sopra resident Yara Gambirasio was murdered here.

== International relations ==
Brembate di Sopra is twinned with:

- Ostrów Mazowiecka, Poland
- Iziaslav, Ukraine
