= Carenno =

Carenno Carèn (Lombard)
- Comune
- Comune di Carenno
- Location of Carenno in Italy Carenno (Lombardy)
- Coordinates: 45°48′N 9°28′E
- Country: Italy
- Region: Lombardy
- Province: Province of Lecco (LC)

Area
  - Total: 7.9 km^{2} (3.1 sq mi)
- Elevation: 635 m (2,083 ft)

Population (Dec. 2004)
  - Total: 1,476
  - Density: 190/km^{2} (480/sq mi)
- Demonym: Carennesi
- Time zone: UTC+1 (CET)
  - Summer (DST): UTC+2 (CEST)
- Postal code: 23802
- Dialing code: 0341
- Website: Official website

Carenno (locally Carèn) is a comune (municipality) in the Province of Lecco in the Italian region Lombardy, located about 45 kilometres (28 mi) northeast of Milan and about 8 kilometres (5 mi) southeast of Lecco. As of 31 December 2004, it had a population of 1,476 and an area of 7.9 square kilometres (3.1 mi^{2}).

Carenno borders the following municipalities: Calolziocorte, Costa Valle Imagna, Erve, Torre de' Busi, Valsecca.

== Demographic evolution ==
Historical population

Year	Pop.	±%
1861	877	—
1871	944	+7.6%
1881	975	+3.3%
1901	1,172	+20.2%
1911	1,390	+18.6%

Year	Pop.	±%
1921	1,453	+4.5%
1931	1,475	+1.5%
1936	1,373	−6.9%
1951	1,436	+4.6%
1961	1,315	−8.4%

Year	Pop.	±%
1971	1,272	−3.3%
1981	1,283	+0.9%
1991	1,298	+1.2%
2001	1,459	+12.4%

Source: Data from ISTAT
