= Treasure Mountain =

Treasure Mountain may refer to:

- Treasure Mountain!, a computer game
- Treasure Mountain (Colorado), a mountain peak

== See also ==
- Monte Tesoro
- Treasure Hill
- Treasure Hill (White Pine County, Nevada)
