= Torre de' Busi =

- Comune
- Comune di Torre de' Busi

- Location within Italy Location within Lombardy
- Coordinates: 45°46′N 9°29′E
- Country: Italy
- Region: Lombardy
- Province: Bergamo (BG)
- Frazioni: Favirano, San Gottardo, San Marco, San Michele, Sogno, Valcava

Government
  - Mayor: Eleonora Ninkovic

Area
  - Total: 9.2 km^{2} (3.6 sq mi)
- Elevation: 472 m (1,549 ft)

Population (31 December 2010)
  - Total: 1,970
  - Density: 210/km^{2} (550/sq mi)
- Demonym: Torrebusini
- Time zone: UTC+1 (CET)
  - Summer (DST): UTC+2 (CEST)
- Postal code: 24032
- Dialing code: 035

Torre de' Busi (Bergamasque: Tór de Büs) is a comune (municipality) in the Province of Bergamo in the Italian region Lombardy, located about 40 kilometres (25 mi) northeast of Milan and about 27 kilometres (17 mi) northwest of Bergamo.

Torre de' Busi borders the following municipalities: Calolziocorte, Caprino Bergamasco, Carenno, Cisano Bergamasco, Costa Valle Imagna, Monte Marenzo, Roncola. The town returned under the Province of Bergamo on 1 January 2018, after 25 years under Lecco Province.
