= Strozza =

- Comune
- Comune di Strozza
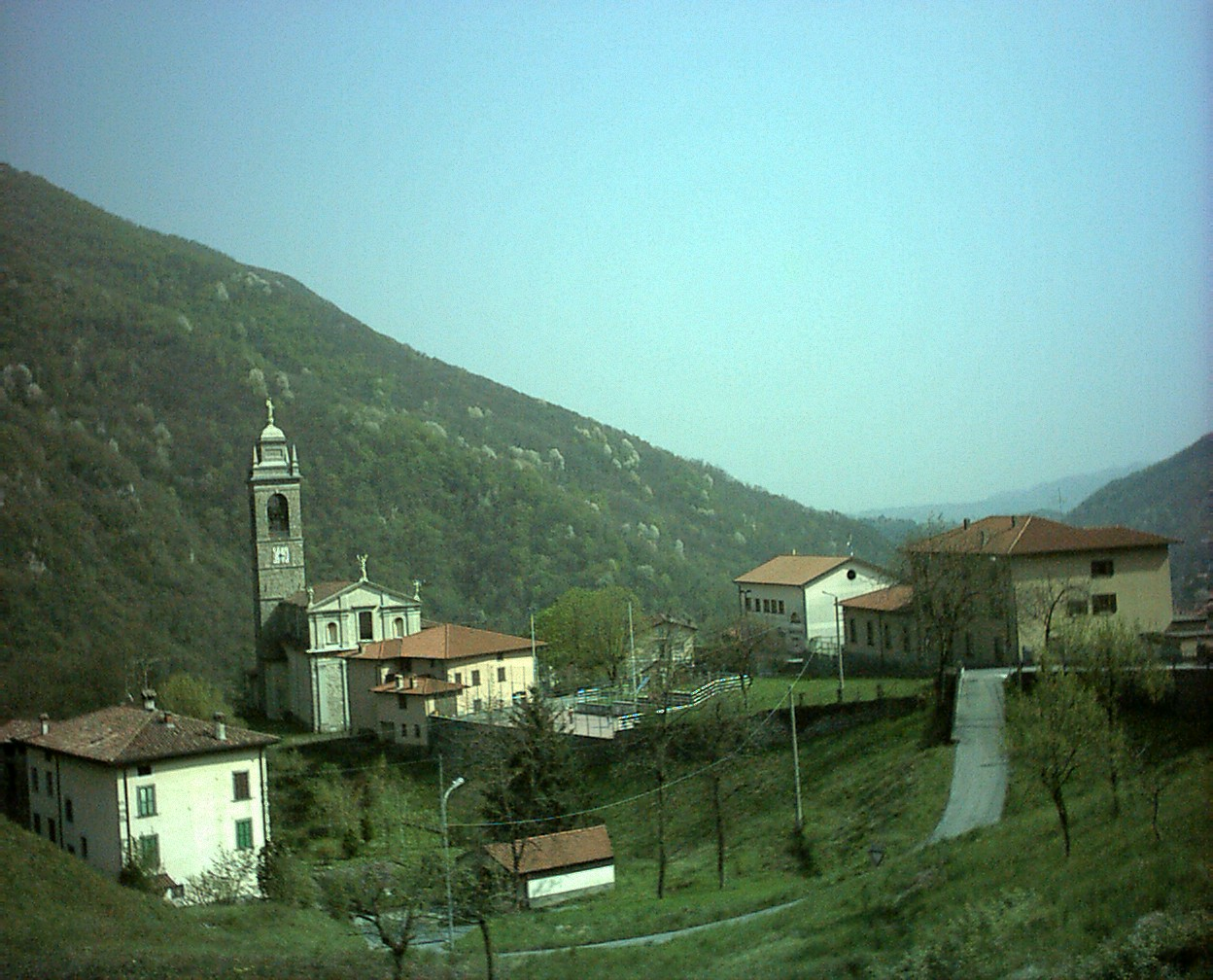
- Strozza

- Coat of arms

- Location within Italy Location within Lombardy
- Coordinates: 45°46′N 9°35′E
- Country: Italy
- Region: Lombardy
- Province: Bergamo (BG)
- Frazioni: Amagno, Ca' Brozzo, Ca' Cagnis, Ca' Campo, Ca' Ligieri, Mezzasc

Government
  - Mayor: Ruggero Persico

Area
  - Total: 3.8 km^{2} (1.5 sq mi)
- Elevation: 378 m (1,240 ft)

Population (31 December 2010)
  - Total: 1,075
  - Density: 280/km^{2} (730/sq mi)
- Demonym: Strozzensi
- Time zone: UTC+1 (CET)
  - Summer (DST): UTC+2 (CEST)
- Postal code: 24030
- Dialing code: 035

Strozza (Bergamasque: Strosa) is a comune (municipality) in the Province of Bergamo in the Italian region of Lombardy, located about 45 kilometres (28 mi) northeast of Milan and about 10 kilometres (6 mi) northwest of Bergamo.

Strozza borders the following municipalities: Almenno San Bartolomeo, Almenno San Salvatore, Capizzone, Roncola, Ubiale Clanezzo.
