= Mapello =

- Comune
- Comune di Mapello
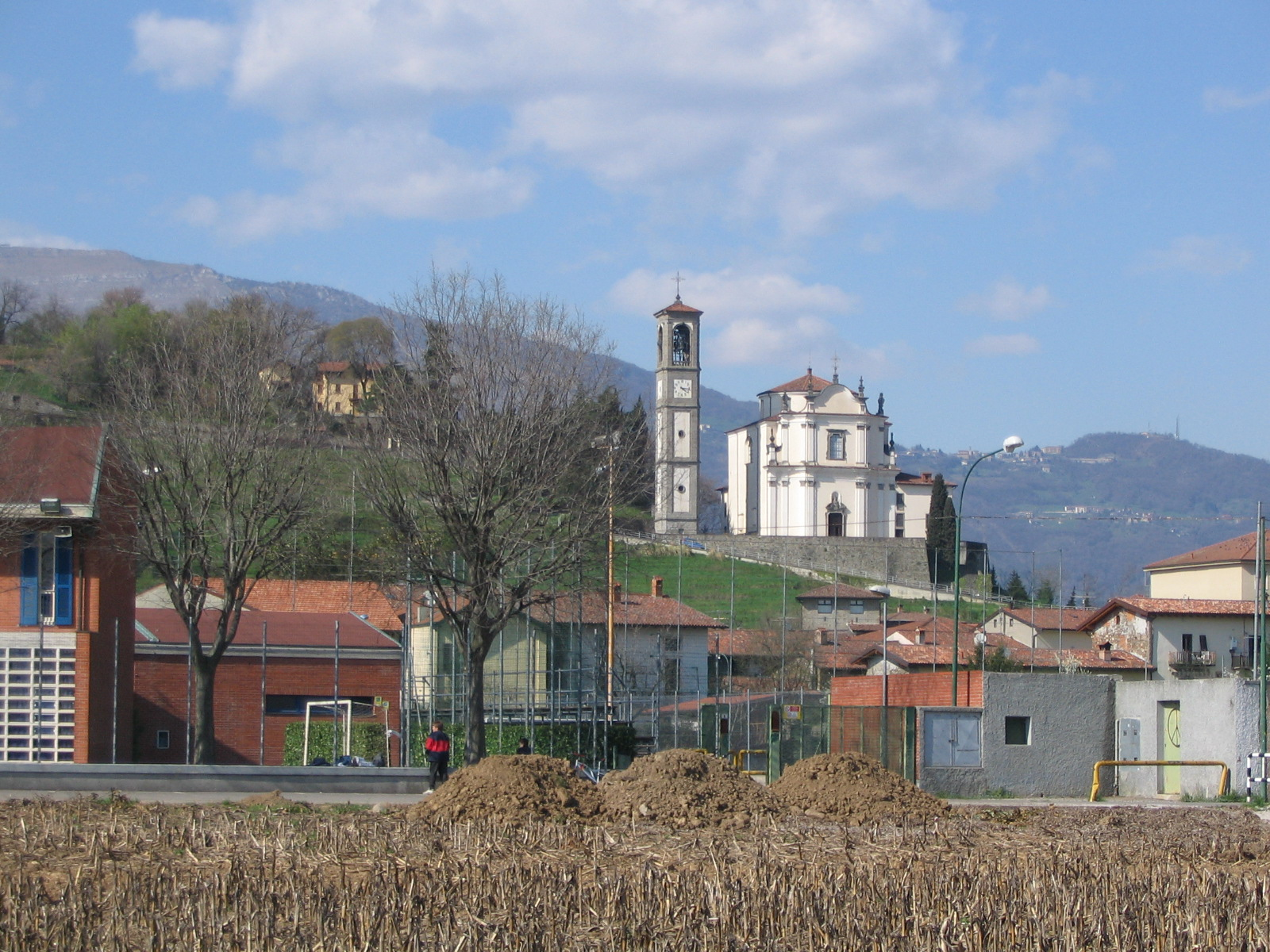
- Church of Saint Michael in Mapello

- Location within Italy Location within Lombardy
- Coordinates: 45°43′N 9°33′E
- Country: Italy
- Region: Lombardy
- Province: Province of Bergamo (BG)

Area
  - Total: 8.5 km^{2} (3.3 sq mi)
- Elevation: 255 m (837 ft)

Population (Dec. 2004)
  - Total: 5,806
  - Density: 680/km^{2} (1,800/sq mi)
- Demonym: Mapellesi
- Time zone: UTC+1 (CET)
  - Summer (DST): UTC+2 (CEST)
- Postal code: 24030
- Dialing code: 035

Mapello (Bergamasque: Mapèl) is a comune (municipality) in the Province of Bergamo in the Italian region of Lombardy, located about 40 kilometres (25 mi) northeast of Milan and about 9 kilometres (6 mi) west of Bergamo. As of 31 December 2004, it had a population of 5,806 and an area of 8.5 square kilometres (3.3 mi^{2}).

Mapello borders the following municipalities: Ambivere, Barzana, Bonate Sopra, Brembate di Sopra, Palazzago, Ponte San Pietro, Presezzo, Sotto il Monte Giovanni XXIII, Terno d'Isola.

== Demographic evolution ==
Historical population

Year	Pop.	±%
1861	1,946	—
1871	1,973	+1.4%
1881	2,003	+1.5%
1901	2,136	+6.6%
1911	2,487	+16.4%

Year	Pop.	±%
1921	2,588	+4.1%
1931	2,752	+6.3%
1936	2,765	+0.5%
1951	3,118	+12.8%
1961	3,201	+2.7%

Year	Pop.	±%
1971	3,657	+14.2%
1981	4,549	+24.4%
1991	5,005	+10.0%
2001	5,606	+12.0%

Source: Data from ISTAT
