= Costa Valle Imagna =

- Comune
- Comune di Costa Valle Imagna
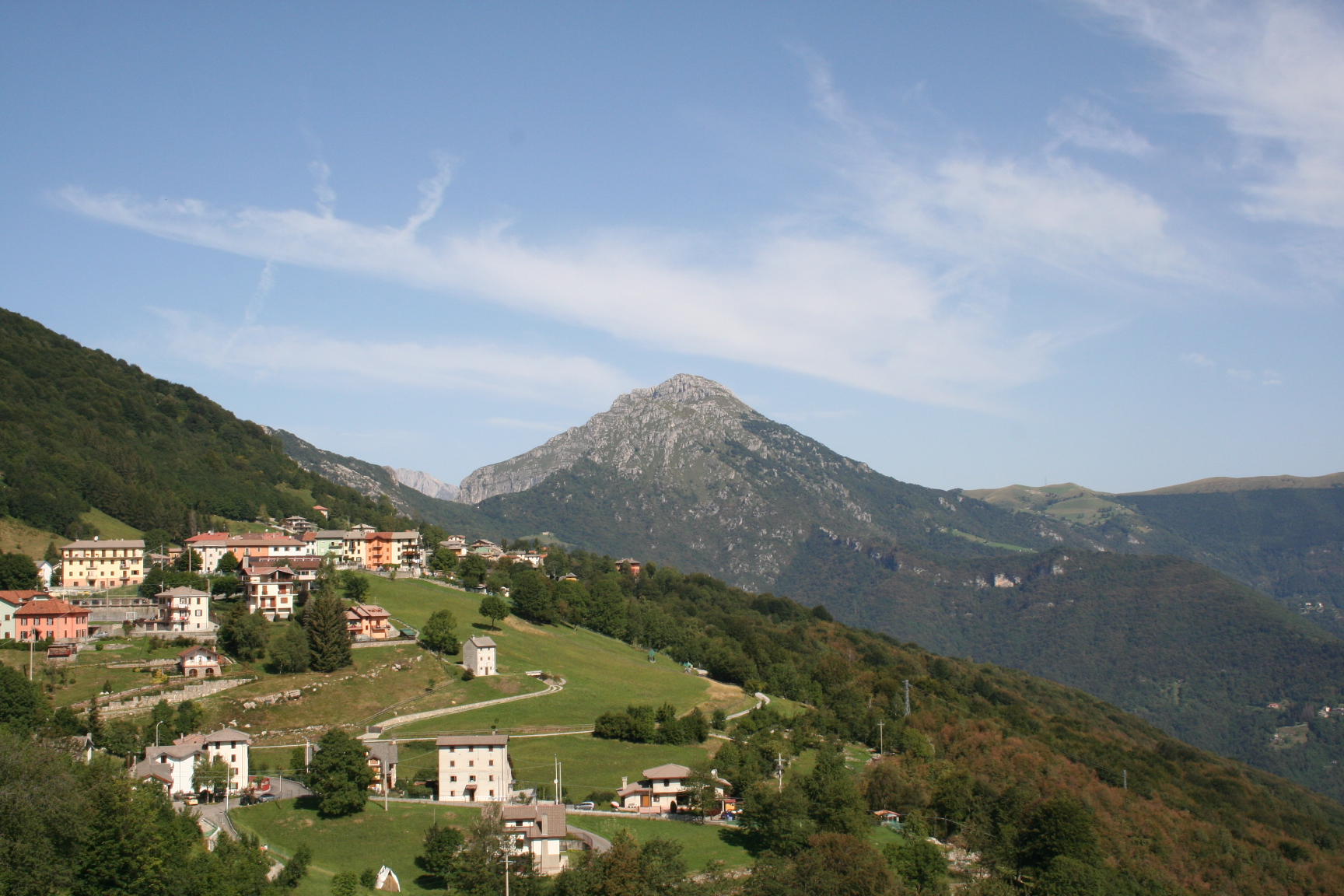
- View with Mount Resegone.

- Coat of arms

- Location within Italy Location within Lombardy
- Coordinates: 45°48′N 9°30′E
- Country: Italy
- Region: Lombardy
- Province: Province of Bergamo (BG)

Government
  - Mayor: Umberto Mazzoleni

Area
  - Total: 4 km^{2} (1.5 sq mi)
- Elevation: 1,014 m (3,327 ft)

Population (1 January 2015)
  - Total: 598
  - Density: 150/km^{2} (390/sq mi)
- Demonym: Costesi
- Time zone: UTC+1 (CET)
  - Summer (DST): UTC+2 (CEST)
- Postal code: 24030
- Dialing code: 035
- Patron saint: Visitation of Mary
- Saint day: 2 July

Costa Valle Imagna (Bergamasque: Còsta) is a comune counting c 600 inhabitants in the province of Bergamo, in Lombardy, northern Italy. Neighbouring communes are Bedulita, Carenno, Roncola, Sant'Omobono Terme and Torre de' Busi.

== Geography ==
Costa lies on a high slope above the Valle Imagna. The village has panoramic views of the Bergamo Alps, including Monte Resegone to the north. From the former ski resort of Forcella Alta and the Pertüs pass, elevation 1,186 to 1,193 metres (3,891 to 3,914 ft), the whole of the Brianza range is visible. For communication reasons the town has had closer links to the San Martino valley, Almenno San Salvatore and the plain, rather than to the rest of the Valle Imagna.

Parish church

== History ==
Originally the area seems to have been used for summer grazing, Costa seems to have been populated year-round only since 1300. The town faces northeast and gets very cold in winter; as a result Costa was known in local slang as "Valle Imagna's warehouse of snow" (la nevera della Valle imagna).

When the Republic of Venice annexed the province of Bergamo in 1428, the town found itself on the borders between Venice and the Duchy of Milan. This is reflected in the slang of the town, which refers to "foreigners" as bir, the equivalent of sbirri, a medieval police force. It has been suggested that this dates back to customs officials sent from Venice to patrol the borders of the republic.

In the Counter-Reformation, a bishop sent a dispatch deploring the state of the village's church that was a result of the poverty of the area. A plague pit is evidence of the 1630 epidemic described by Alessandro Manzoni.

Since the early 20th century, Costa Valle Imagna has grown in its role of summer resort.
