= Mazzoleni =

Mazzoleni is an Italian surname. Notable people with the surname include:

- Eddy Mazzoleni (born 1973), Italian bicycle racer
- Marc'Antonio Mazzoleni, Italian instrument maker
- Ester Mazzoleni (1883–1982), Italian soprano
- Ettore Mazzoleni (1905–1968), Canadian conductor
- Roberto Mazzoleni, Italian sprinter
