= Calolziocorte =

- Comune
- Città di Calolziocorte
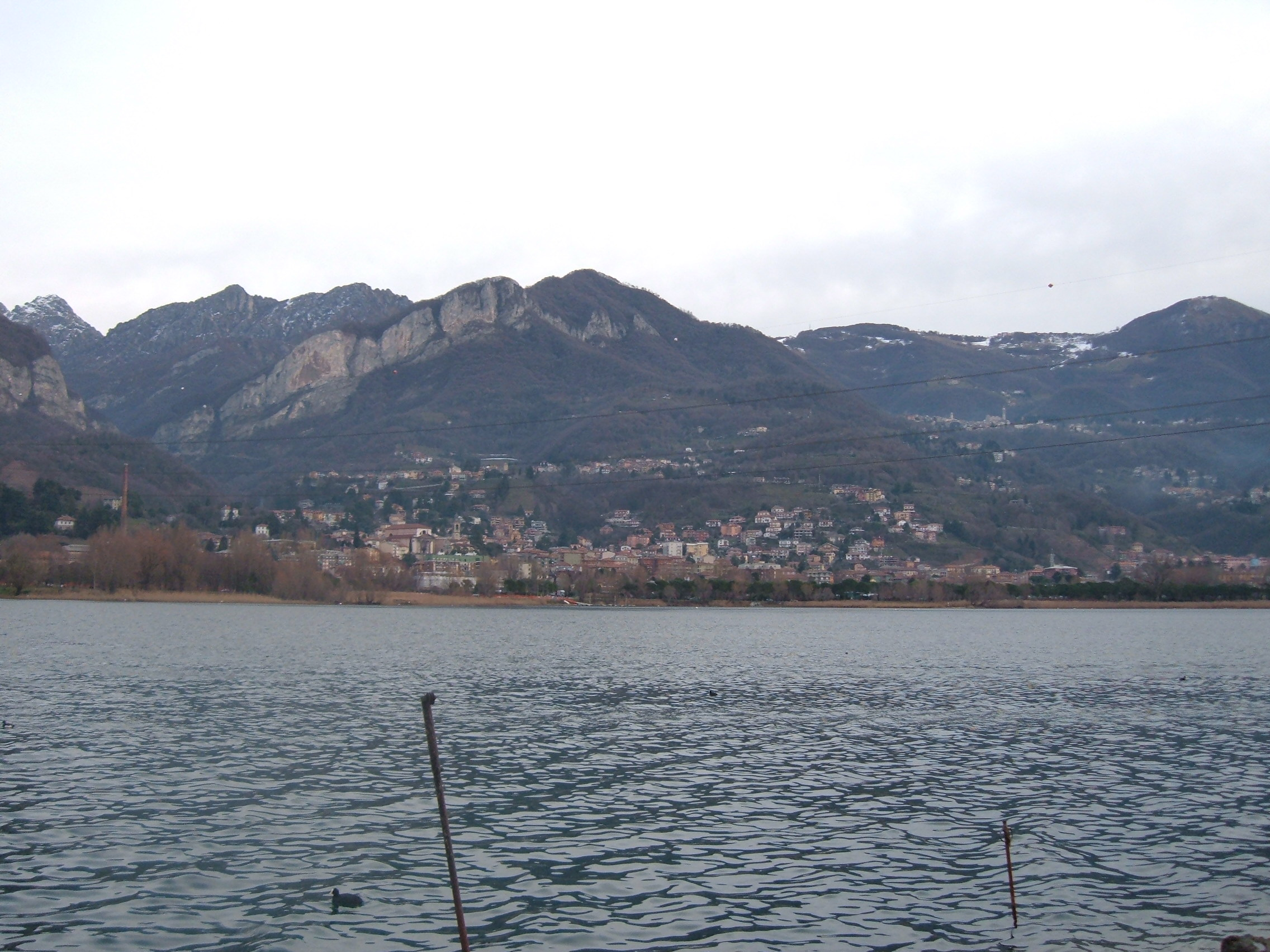
- Calolziocorte

- Location within Italy Location within Lombardy
- Coordinates: 45°48′N 9°26′E
- Country: Italy
- Region: Lombardy
- Province: Lecco (LC)
- Frazioni: Rossino, Lorentino, Sopracornola, Pascolo, Foppenico, Sala

Government
  - Mayor: Cesare Valsecchi

Area
  - Total: 9.0 km^{2} (3.5 sq mi)
- Elevation: 210 m (690 ft)

Population (1 January 2014)
  - Total: 14,162
  - Density: 1,600/km^{2} (4,100/sq mi)
- Demonym: Calolziesi
- Time zone: UTC+1 (CET)
  - Summer (DST): UTC+2 (CEST)
- Postal code: 23801
- Dialing code: 0341
- Website: Official website

Calolziocorte (locally Calòls) is a comune (municipality) in the Province of Lecco in the Italian region Lombardy, located about 40 kilometres (25 mi) northeast of Milan and about 6 kilometres (4 mi) southeast of Lecco. Until 1992, it was part of the province of Bergamo.

Calolziocorte borders the following municipalities: Brivio, Carenno, Erve, Monte Marenzo, Olginate, Torre de' Busi, Vercurago.

Calolziocorte received the honorary title of city with a presidential decree on December 10, 2002.

It is served by Calolziocorte-Olginate railway station.

== People ==
- Baby Gang, Rapper
- Michela Vittoria Brambilla, politician
- Aureliano Brandolini, agronomist and development cooperation scholar
