= Valsecca =

Italian municipality

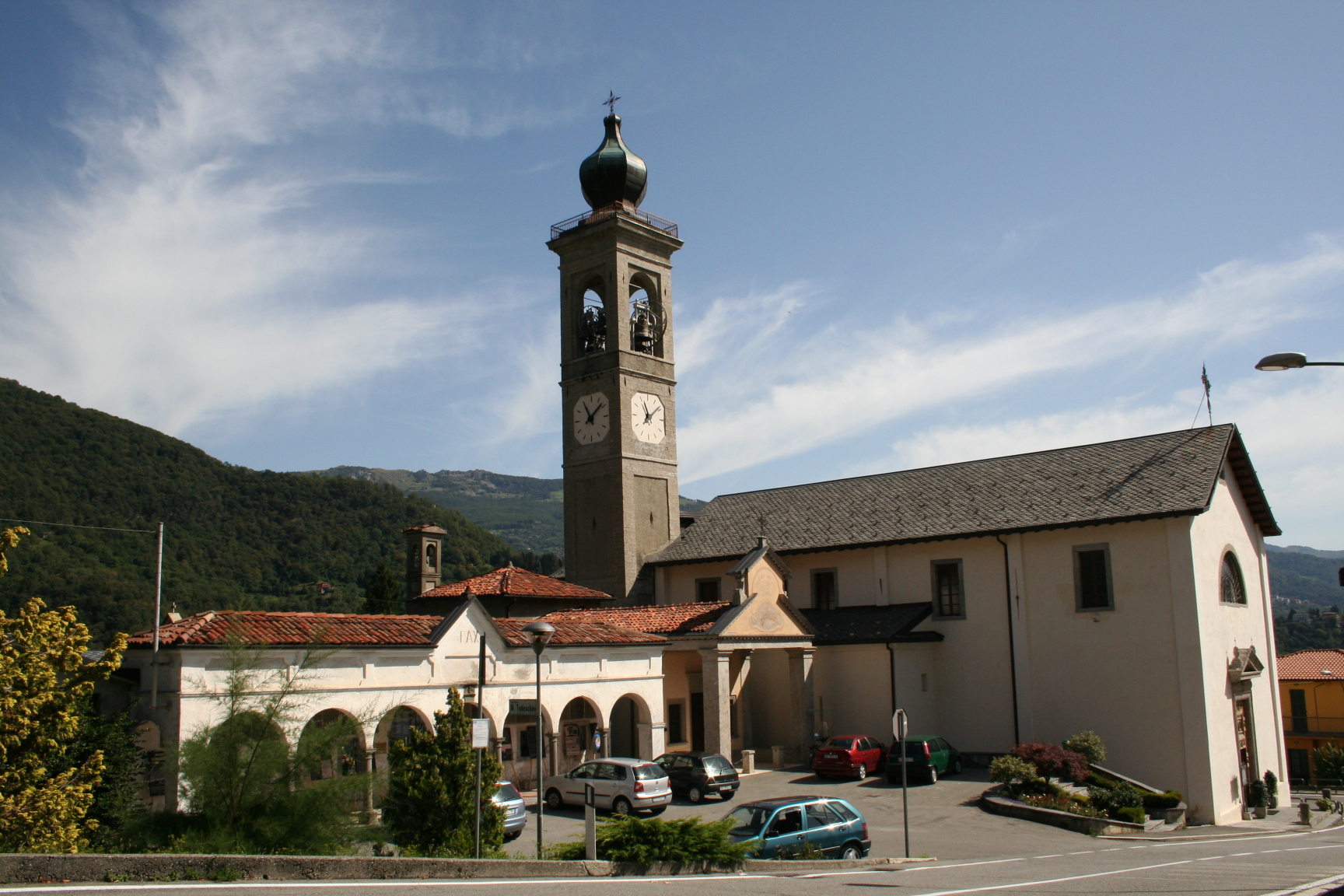
View of Valsecca.

Valsecca was a comune (municipality) in the Province of Bergamo in the Italian region of Lombardy, located about 50 kilometres (31 mi) northeast of Milan and about 20 kilometres (12 mi) northwest of Bergamo. As of 31 December 2004, it had a population of 411 and an area of 5.2 square kilometres (2.0 mi^{2}). In 2014 it was merged into the comune of Sant'Omobono Terme.
