= Cisano Bergamasco =

- Comune
- Comune di Cisano Bergamasco
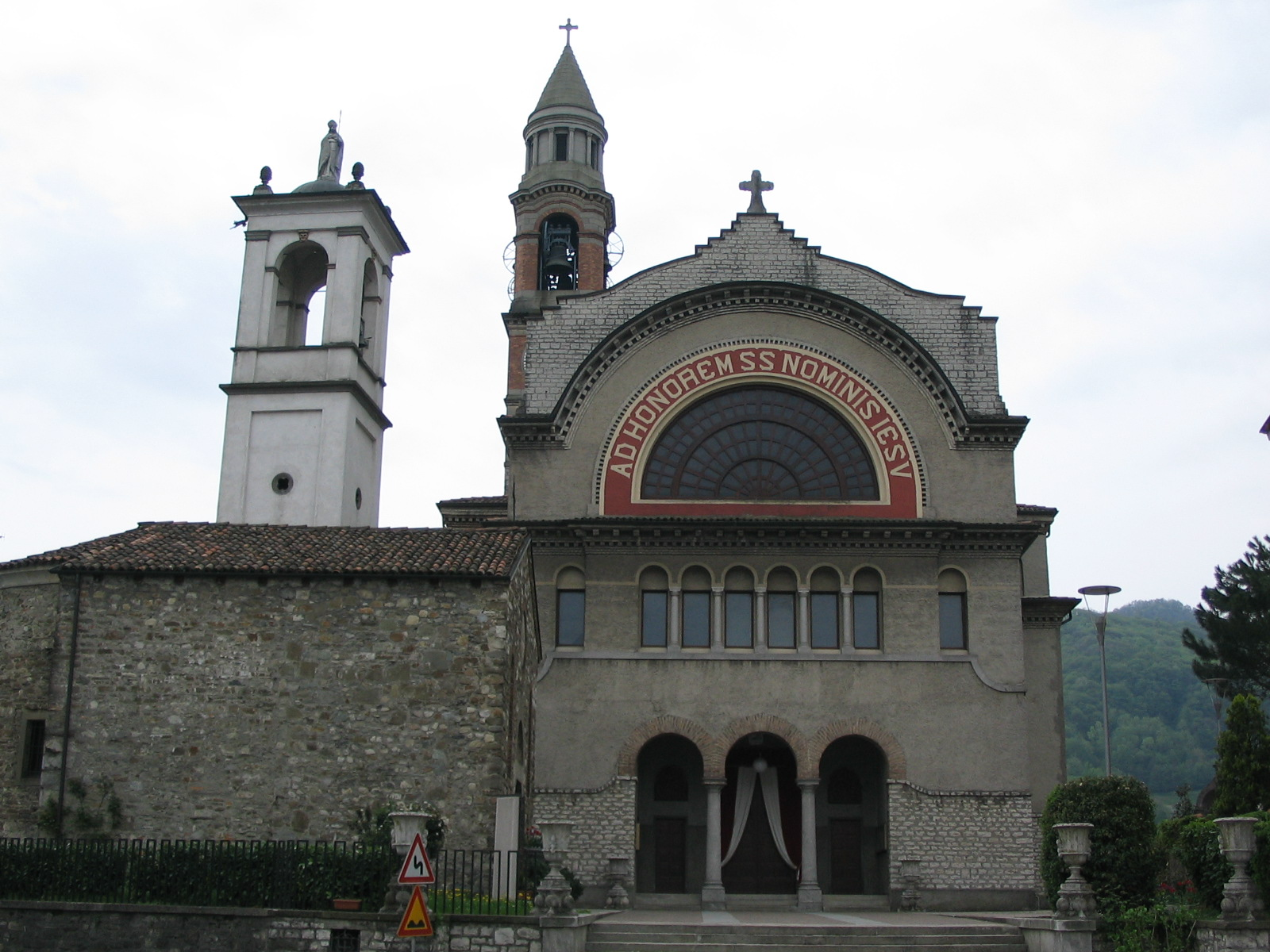
- The Parrocchiale of Cisano Bergamasco

- Coat of arms

- Location within Italy Location within Lombardy
- Coordinates: 45°43′N 9°29′E
- Country: Italy
- Region: Lombardy
- Province: Bergamo (BG)
- Frazioni: La Sosta, Bondì, Bisone, Villasola, San Gregorio, Valbonaga

Government
  - Mayor: Andrea Previtali

Area
  - Total: 7.54 km^{2} (2.91 sq mi)
- Elevation: 268 m (879 ft)

Population (30 November 2016)
  - Total: 6,385
  - Density: 847/km^{2} (2,190/sq mi)
- Demonym: Cisanesi
- Time zone: UTC+1 (CET)
  - Summer (DST): UTC+2 (CEST)
- Postal code: 24034
- Dialing code: 035
- Patron saint: St. Zeno
- Saint day: 12 April

Cisano Bergamasco (Bergamasque: Cisà or Sisà; Brianzöö: Cisàn) is a town and comune in the province of Bergamo, Lombardy, northern Italy.

== See also ==
- Northern Italy
