= Treviglio =

Treviglio Treì (Lombard)
- Comune
- Città di Treviglio
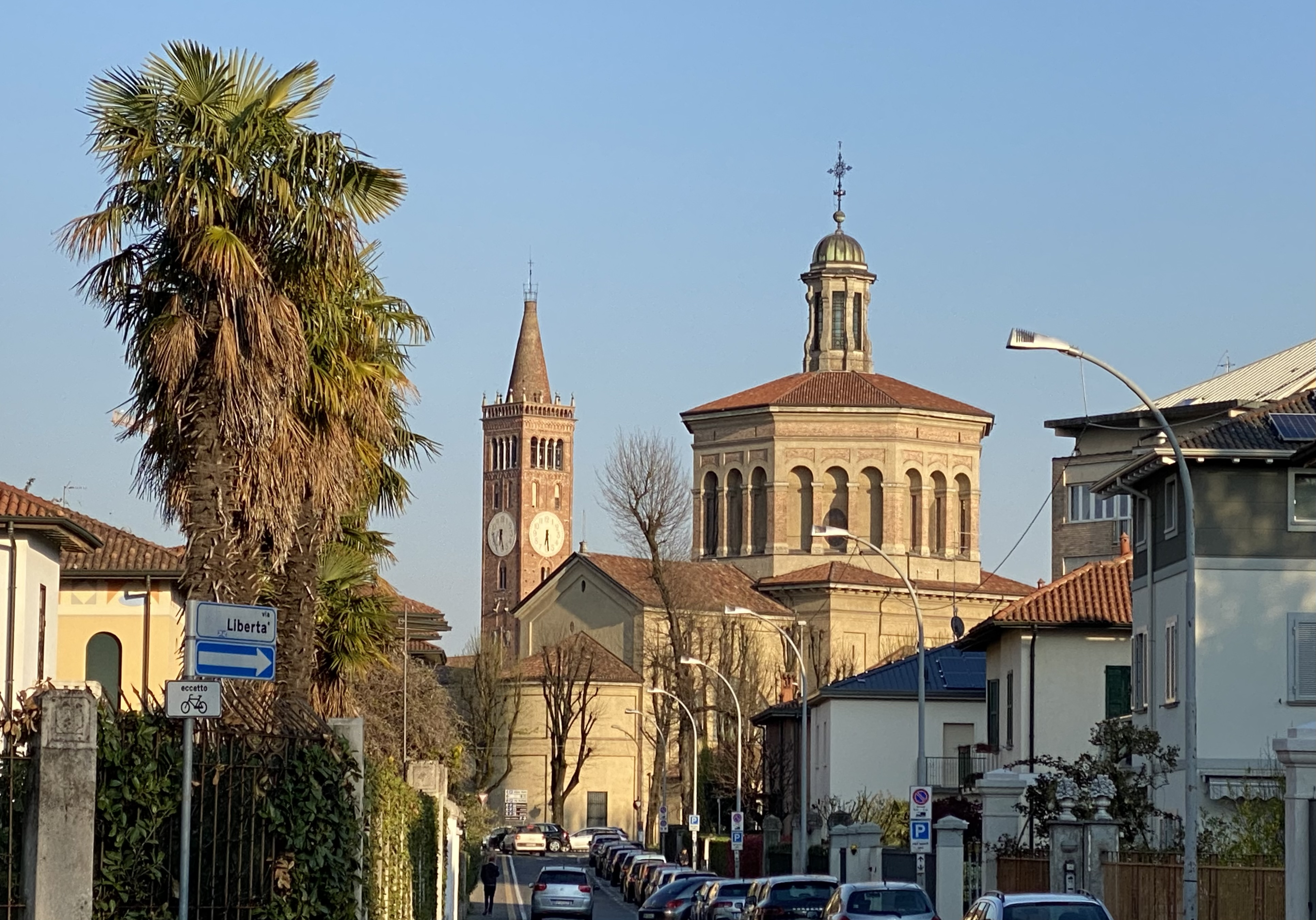
- View of the city

- Coat of arms

- Location within Italy Location within Lombardy
- Coordinates: 45°31′N 09°36′E
- Country: Italy
- Region: Lombardy
- Province: Bergamo (BG)
- Frazioni: Battaglie, Castel Cerreto, Geromina, Pezzoli

Government
  - Mayor: Juri Imeri

Area
  - Total: 32.22 km^{2} (12.44 sq mi)
- Elevation: 125 m (410 ft)

Population (2026)
  - Total: 31,604
  - Density: 980.9/km^{2} (2,540/sq mi)
- Demonym: Trevigliesi
- Time zone: UTC+1 (CET)
  - Summer (DST): UTC+2 (CEST)
- Postal code: 24047
- Dialing code: 0363
- Patron saint: Saint Martin and the Holy Virgin
- Saint day: Last day of February
- Website: Official website

Treviglio (Italian: [treˈviʎʎo]; Bergamasque: Treì) is a town and comune (municipality) in the Province of Bergamo in the region of Lombardy in Italy. It is situated in the heart of the Po Valley, approximately 22 km (14 mi) south of the provincial capital, Bergamo. With a population of 31,604, it is the 2nd-largest comune in the province.

Founded during the Early Middle Ages through the unification of three settlements for defensive purposes, Treviglio serves as the main hub of the Gera d'Adda region. Its strategic location is underscored by its position at the crossroads of roads and railways connecting it to Bergamo, Brescia, Cremona, Lodi, and Milan.

== Etymology ==
The name Treviglio derives from Trevillae, referring to three rural communities that merged for defensive purposes. Portoli, Pisgnano, and Cusarola united to form a fortified center called Trivillium.

The village's prosperity was later denoted by the addition of the term Grassum.

A less likely theory suggests the name comes from the Latin Trivium, meaning a crossroads of three roads, known as a trivium. This hypothesis is plausible, as the original castrum vetus (old fort) was built at the intersection of three roads leading to the three original settlements.

Throughout history, the city has been known by various names, including Trivilio, Trevì, Trevino, and Trevilio, before ultimately adopting Treviglio as its official name.

== Geography ==
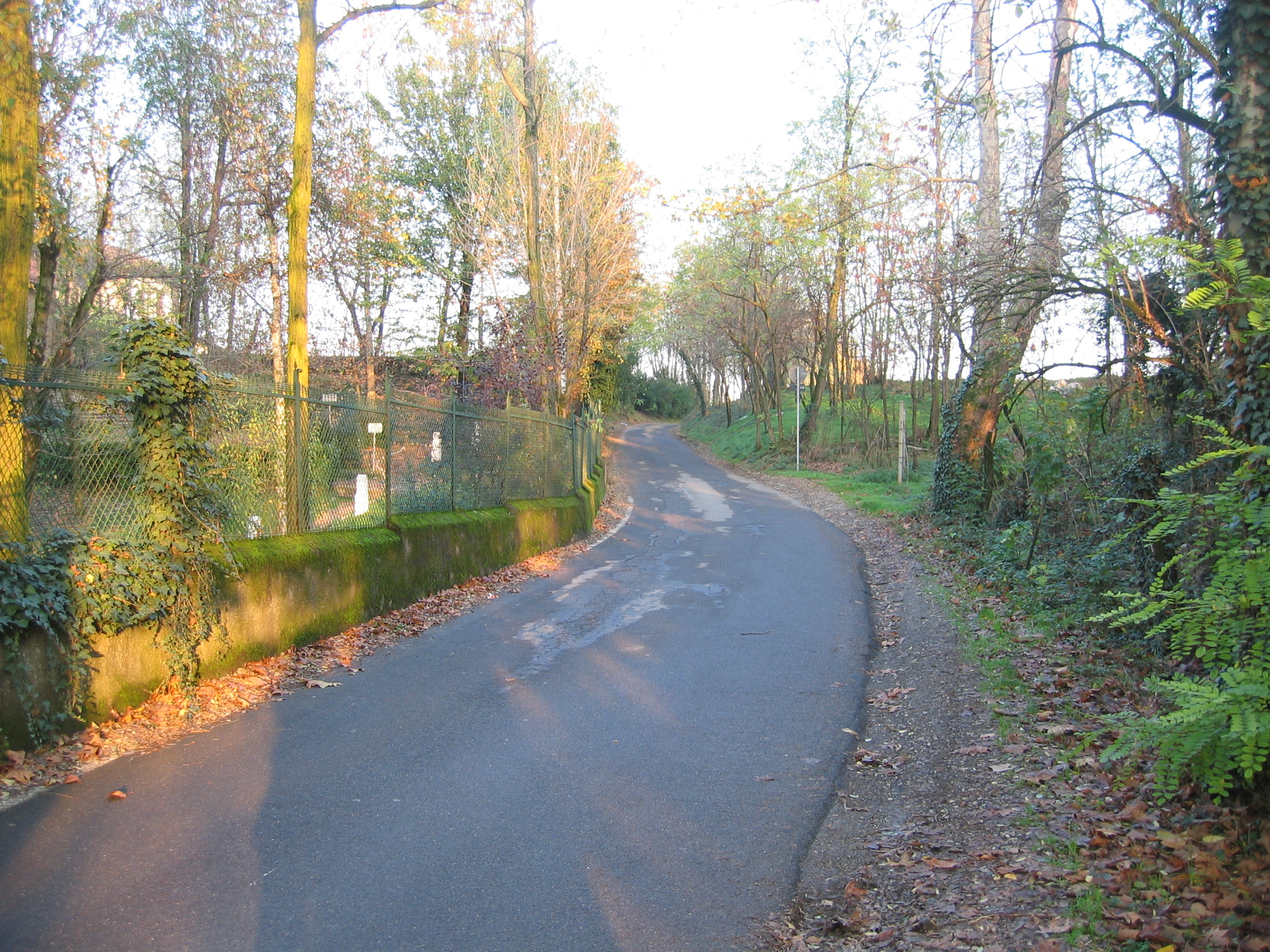
Descent near the Adda River

Treviglio's territory spans 32.22 km², located within the Gera d'Adda, a region largely within the lower Bergamasque area between the Adda and Serio Rivers, approximately 2 km from the former. It borders the municipalities of Arcene, Brignano Gera d'Adda, Calvenzano, Caravaggio, Casirate d'Adda, Cassano d'Adda (MI), Castel Rozzone, Fara Gera d'Adda, and Pontirolo Nuovo.

Although situated in the Po Valley, the terrain features elevation changes of up to 15 metres near the Adda River (Note: See File:Discesa Gera d'Adda.jpg below.) due to a morphological terrace known as the Treviglio Coast. The city's central core lies at 125 metres above sea level, with the altitude varying by 35 metres, gradually decreasing from the northeast to the southwest.

=== Geology and morphology ===
Treviglio's soil is of alluvial origin, consisting primarily of layers of gravel, sand, and, at greater depths, sandstone. Beneath the alluvial layer, the terrain includes strata from the Quaternary, marine deposits, Pliocene, Langhian, Aquitanian, and Holocene periods.

The western part of the municipal territory is crossed by a morphological terrace called the Treviglio Coast, dividing the municipality into two distinct zones: the eastern area, encompassing the city center, most of Geromina, and all of Battaglie and Castel Cerreto, dates to the Pleistocene, while a smaller western portion, including the Pezzoli farmstead and the Treviza lake, belongs to the Holocene.

Additionally, there are two quarries: one near the road to Badalasco and another close to the road to Casirate d'Adda. In the past, such quarries were transformed into lakes, with the Treviza lake near the Roccolo being a prime example. Another former lake, now the Vailata quarry, was formed due to erosion processes.

=== Hydrology ===
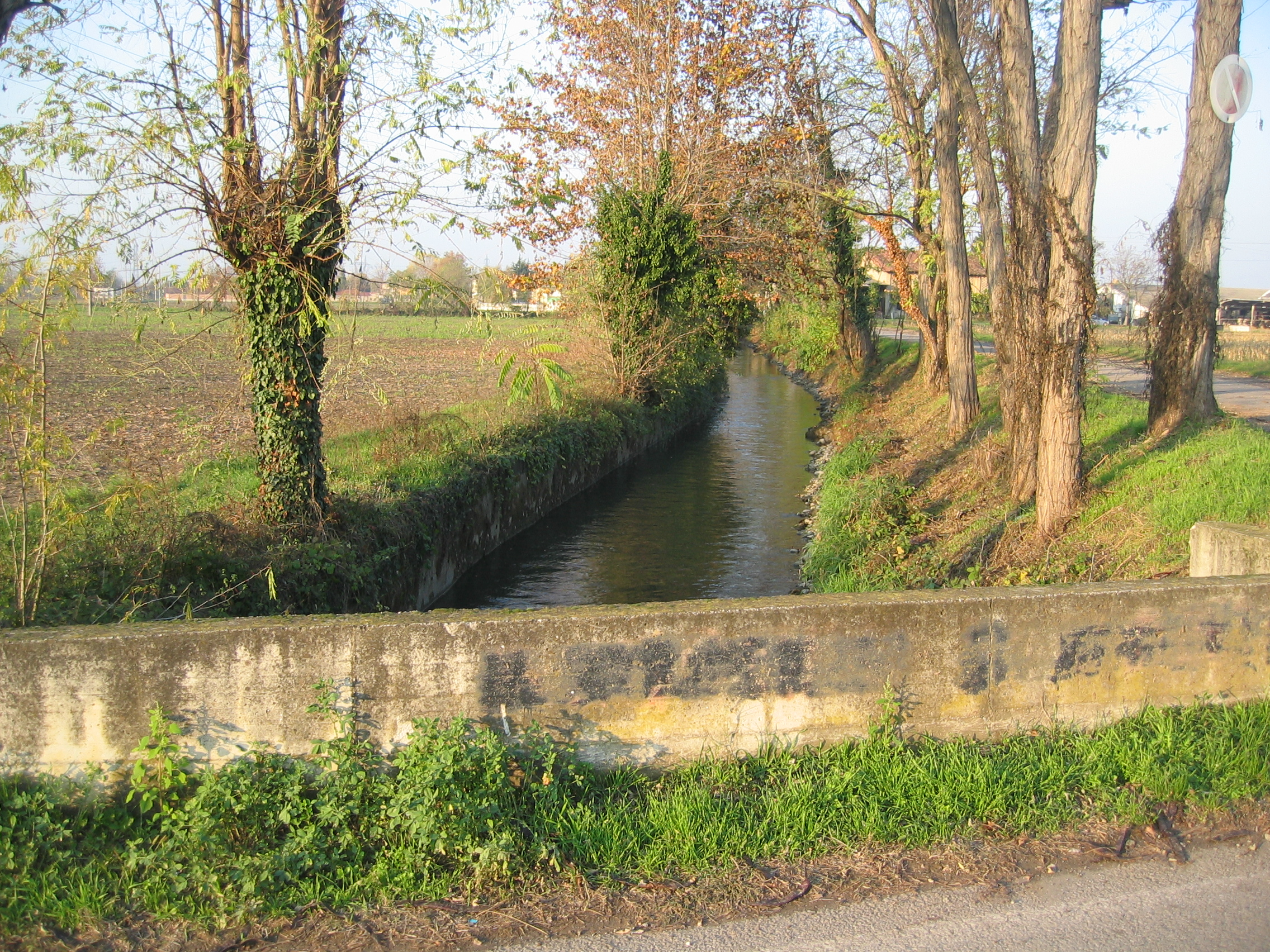
The Vailata canal flowing through the countryside west of Treviglio

==== Rivers ====
The city of Treviglio is situated around 5 kilometers from the Adda River, though the river itself does not flow directly through the city, as the municipal territory of Cassano d'Adda, including its frazioni of Cascate, Cascine San Pietro, and Taranta, extends to the opposite bank. In ancient times, when the Adda was wider and formed the so-called Lake Gerundo, the western part of the comune was likely submerged, situated beyond the morphological terrace of the Treviglio Coast.

==== Canals, ditches, and wells ====
The territory is intersected by multiple ditches, one of which, derived from the Brembo River, skirts the historic center via the Mulina canal along Via Cavallotti. Since medieval times, this canal supplied water to the moat of the village, located beneath the inner ring road. Historical models in the civic museum show that the moat originally consisted of three smaller channels, later merged into a single one. The moat's covering began in the 19th century and was completed in the first half of the 20th century.

From a hydrogeological perspective, while the area does not exhibit severe signs of soil degradation, it remains partially at risk of flooding.

The municipality also has four wells for water supply: three near the historic center with depths of 132.5, 67, and 76 meters, and one near the frazione of Castel Cerreto at 48 meters. Additionally, two wells for hydrocarbon exploration, with depths of 850 and 1,009.5 meters, are located in the northern part of the territory.

=== Seismology ===
From a seismic perspective, Treviglio has a low and uniformly distributed seismic risk. It is classified as Zone 3 (low seismicity) by the Protezione Civile.

=== Climate ===
Treviglio's climate is characterized by hot summers and cold winters, often accompanied by fog and one or more snowfalls annually. Autumn and spring bring extended periods of rain.

Like the rest of the Po Valley, Treviglio experiences minimal wind activity at ground level due to the region's geographical configuration. Wind speeds typically remain below 0.5 m/s, decreasing further in winter.

According to the Italian climate classification system, Treviglio is in Zone E with 2,237 DD.

The climate is monitored by the local Protezione Civile's weather station.

== History ==
Wolf hunting

At the start of the 19th century, wolves were so prevalent in the woods around Treviglio, particularly in the Valle del Lupo area, that bounties were established: 8 lire for a pup, 12 for a male, and 18 for a female. Wolves have been extinct in the area since 1830.

Treviglio's origins trace back to the Early Middle Ages, with evidence of earlier settlements, formed by the unification of three pre-existing villae from which the name derives: Cusarola, of Gallic origin to the north; Pisgnano, of Roman origin to the south; and Portoli, of Lombard origin to the west, a port near the Adda River.

This unification was gradual, making it impossible to pinpoint an exact founding date. The initial settlement was enclosed by defensive walls, with three distinct gates oriented toward the original settlements. The merger aimed to enhance defense and share agricultural resources.

The earliest official document (Note: Preserved in the chapter archive of Bergamo Cathedral.) mentioning the new village dates to November 964, a land swap contract between Odelrico, the Bishop of Bergamo, and Garibaldo of Stagiano. It involved the sale of several pertiche (Note: The Bergamasque unit of surface area referenced equals 662.31 square meters.) of land.

Treviglio's early administrative structure involved the direct election of twenty consuls from each of the three original villages, totaling 60 consuls. (Note: Statutes are still preserved in Treviglio's historical archive at the civic museum.) These consuls served six-month terms, ensuring all citizens had a turn in governance.

=== Middle Ages ===
Around the year 1000, Treviglio's population grew with the arrival of residents from Oriano, a municipality near Brescia destroyed during conflicts between Arduin of Ivrea and Henry II over the Italian crown. These newcomers settled in the southeast, prompting an expansion of the walls and the addition of a fourth gate, named Oriano.

After a period of dependence on the San Simpliciano Monastery in Milan, Treviglio gained autonomy from the Empire and later the Visconti family, becoming directly dependent on the Imperial Chamber and subsequently the Milan Senate. From 1395 to 1789, it was a "separate territory of the Duchy of Milan," except for brief periods of Venetian control (1431–1433, 1448–1453, and 1499 to 1509 (Note: Following the Venetian defeat at the Battle of Agnadello.)), when Venice had conquered most of Bergamo's territory.

The final Venetian occupation ended on 8 May 1509, with the sacking and burning of Treviglio, then home to over 13,000 inhabitants. This event shocked Louis XII, who, observing the flames from across the Adda in Cassano, crossed the river and decisively defeated the Venetians at Agnadello. From then on, the Gera d'Adda was firmly tied to Milan, and Venice halted its mainland expansion.

In 1522, during the war between Francis I of France and Emperor Charles V for European dominance, Treviglio faced another threat of sacking but was spared. Chronicles attribute the town's salvation to the miraculous weeping of a Madonna fresco in the Augustinian monastery. French general Odet de Foix, Viscount of Lautrec, reportedly laid down his helmet and sword (still preserved in the Sanctuary) at the Virgin's feet on 27 February, ordering his troops to withdraw.

During the Spanish period, Treviglio was declared a fief and put up for auction, but its fiercely independent citizens opposed the measure. After losing a legal battle against the Milan Senate, they raised 14,000 lire between 1612 and 1664 to buy back their village.

In 1758, reforms by Empress Maria Theresa replaced Treviglio's democratic system with an oligarchy of landowners. The old consulate was replaced by a 16-member Regency, with routine administration handled by a five-member Property Assessment Board composed of the wealthiest landowners.

Its current location in the province of Bergamo dates back to 1798 when the Jacobin revolutionaries established it.

=== Symbols ===
==== Municipal coat of arms and banner ====
The coat of arms of the city of Treviglio

The symbol of the municipality is its coat of arms, officially recognized by a decree of the Head of Government, Prime Minister, and Secretary of State on 4 December 1932. The coat of arms features three animals: two lions symbolizing the citizens, an eagle representing the Ghibelline imperial past, and a pig denoting prosperity. Other elements include a tower representing the city and silver, another symbol of prosperity.

Blazon of the coat of arms:

Argent, a tower open, embattled in the Ghibelline style, flanked by two lions rampant, each resting one forepaw and one hindpaw on the tower, surmounted by an eagle holding an inverted pig in its talons.

— D.C.G. 4 December 1932

The symbol appears above the main entrance of the municipal palace and traces of it remain on the bell tower, where it was once displayed below the clock face. The two lions rampant beneath the tower are still visible there.

The civic banner, granted by a Presidential Decree on 22 April 1980, is a "white cloth"; previously, a tricolour banner of green, red, and white was used.

==== Symbol of the Three Crosses ====
The symbol of three crosses represents Treviglio's origins, when the Roman settlements of Portoli, Pisgnano, and Cusarola merged to form a single center. The crosses symbolize the respective churches of Saint Maurice, Saint Eutropius, and Saint Zeno. This symbol is displayed on the facade of Simone Della Piazza's house overlooking Piazza Manara.

=== Honors ===
Treviglio has held the title of city since 8 January 1860, granted by a royal decree of Victor Emmanuel II, signed by Urbano Rattazzi. Due to its participation in the Cisalpine Republic in 1815 and the 1848 uprisings, the Kingdom of Lombardy-Venetia revoked the city title. It was restored on 8 January 1860 by Victor Emmanuel II, during the Risorgimento.

Among the most significant municipal honors are the Saint Martin Gold Award and the Madonna of Tears Award.

== Demographics ==
Historical population
Year	Pop.	±%
1600	6,000	—
1700	5,000	−16.7%
1780	5,000	+0.0%
1800	5,000	+0.0%
1805	6,185	+23.7%
1810	8,573	+38.6%
1816	7,109	−17.1%
1856	9,692	+36.3%

Historical population
Year	Pop.	±%
1861	11,163	—
1871	11,981	+7.3%
1881	14,083	+17.5%
1901	14,897	+5.8%
1911	17,481	+17.3%
1921	17,825	+2.0%
1931	19,144	+7.4%
1936	19,164	+0.1%
1951	21,555	+12.5%
1961	23,413	+8.6%
1971	25,989	+11.0%
1981	26,132	+0.6%
1991	25,299	−3.2%
2001	25,736	+1.7%
2011	28,410	+10.4%
2021	30,567	+7.6%
Source: ISTAT

In 1501, the population of Treviglio exceeded 6,000 inhabitants.

Between 1805 and 1810, the population grew from 6,185 to 8,573 inhabitants due to the temporary Napoleonic annexation of Calvenzano and Casirate, which were later separated during the Conservative Order. Consequently, by 1816, the population had decreased to 7,109 inhabitants.

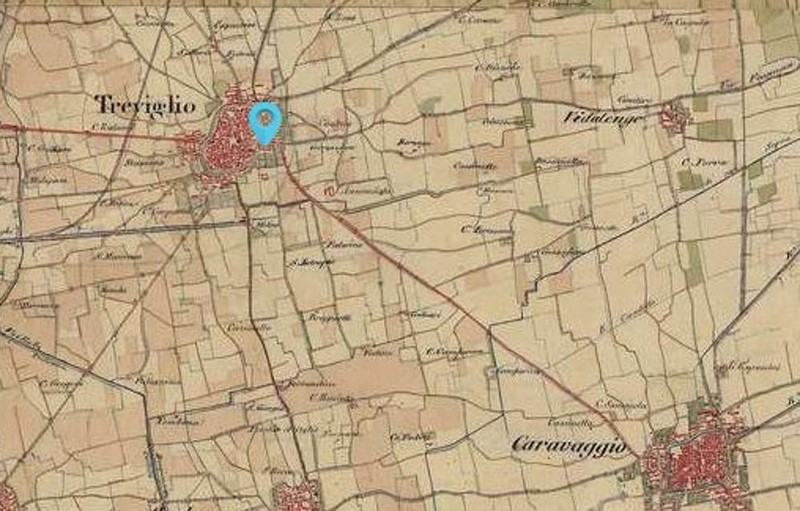
Treviglio and its surroundings in the 1820s

At the time of the Unification of Italy, Treviglio had 11,163 inhabitants, making it the second most populous municipality in the Province of Bergamo. (Note: After the provincial capital, Bergamo.)

=== Immigration ===
As of 2025, of the known countries of birth of 30,911 residents, the most numerous are: Italy (26,136 – 84.6%), Egypt (1,148 – 3.7%), Albania (867 – 2.8%), Morocco (608 – 2%), Pakistan (322 – 1%), Romania (308 – 1%), Senegal (175 – 0.6%).

Foreign population by country of birth (2025)
Country of birth	Population
Egypt	1,148
Albania	867
Morocco	608
Pakistan	322
Romania	308
Ukraine	237
Senegal	175
Brazil	103
China	101
Peru	98
Moldova	90
India	73
Ecuador	72
Russia	58
Poland	54

=== Languages and dialects ===
The Treviglio dialect belongs to the group of Eastern Lombard or Orobic dialects. It differs significantly from the dialect spoken in the city of Bergamo, the Bergamasque valleys, and the dialects of the lower Bergamasque municipalities beyond the Gera d'Adda region.

The Treviglio dialect features softer sounds compared to the Bergamasque dialects spoken in the north of the province, as it is more influenced by surrounding dialects, such as the Cremish dialect and, in particular, the Milanese dialect.

The sounds are less aspirated than in nearby dialects where the "s" is aspirated (e.g., in Cologno al Serio), and there is a tendency to replace the "s" with an "h" in words like sura (above) or hura.

Reflecting its historical ties to Milan, the dialect includes many terms of clear Milanese origin, such as: cardiga (chair), cicinì (a little), and furcheta (fork).

Words are typically truncated: prestinèr (baker), legnamèr (carpenter), sindèch (mayor), francès (French), inglès (English). For terms related to professions, the suffix -èr is commonly used.

With the exception of the number "one," the numbering system follows the Milanese dialect.

=== Religion ===
The predominant religion in Treviglio is Catholicism. Although located in the Province of Bergamo, the municipality is part of the Archdiocese of Milan, specifically within the VI pastoral zone of Melegnano. Treviglio is the seat of a deanery and has a dean, who also holds the title of provost.

The Treviglio deanery includes a total of nine parishes, comprising the five within the city and those in the neighboring municipalities of Canonica d'Adda, Castel Rozzone, Fara Gera d'Adda, and Pontirolo Nuovo.

Despite its affiliation with the Milanese archdiocese, Treviglio has never adopted the Ambrosian Rite and, unusually for the diocese, (Note: The only other municipalities in the archdiocese are Trezzo sull'Adda, Monza, Brugherio, and Villasanta.) retains the Roman Rite. Over the centuries, this has been a significant point of contention between senior Milanese prelates, including Charles Borromeo, and the Treviglio clergy, who, with the support of the local population, ensured the Roman Rite was maintained.

The municipality is home to the Daughters of the Church, a female religious institute. Until 2015, the Sisters of Maria Bambina were present at the Collegio degli Angeli, along with the male religious institutes of the Montfort Missionaries and the Salesians, as well as the male apostolic life society of the White Fathers.

In addition to Catholicism, Islam (primarily Sunni) is practiced, with a place of worship located near the central station.

=== Quality of life ===
==== Environmental monitoring ====
Air quality in Treviglio is poor, consistent with the rest of the Po Valley, one of Europe's most polluted areas. However, a slight improvement trend has been observed. In 2023, the number of days exceeding the legal limit for average PM10 levels was 28, an improvement from the 35 days recorded the previous year.

Through resolution no. 94 of 12 June 2007, the Treviglio municipal council established an agreement with the ARPA for environmental monitoring within its territory. This decision was ratified on 4 October 2007 through a formal agreement. The activities include:

- Thirty samples of industrial water discharges into surface watercourses;
- Monitoring of atmospheric emissions from five companies located in the municipality, with five separate air quality monitoring campaigns using passive activated carbon detectors;
- Twelve inspections of diesel vehicle exhaust gases using an opacimeter;
- Ten soil inspections following the spreading of sludge and livestock waste in agriculture;
- Five noise level measurements at businesses designated by the municipality.

Analytical data on water samples, despite detecting high concentrations of hexavalent chromium, were found to comply with current regulations.

Following the 2008 assessments, the council decided to include monitoring of electromagnetic pollution and a census of asbestos in 2009, the latter in accordance with the regional asbestos plan established by the Region of Lombardy.

== Institutions ==
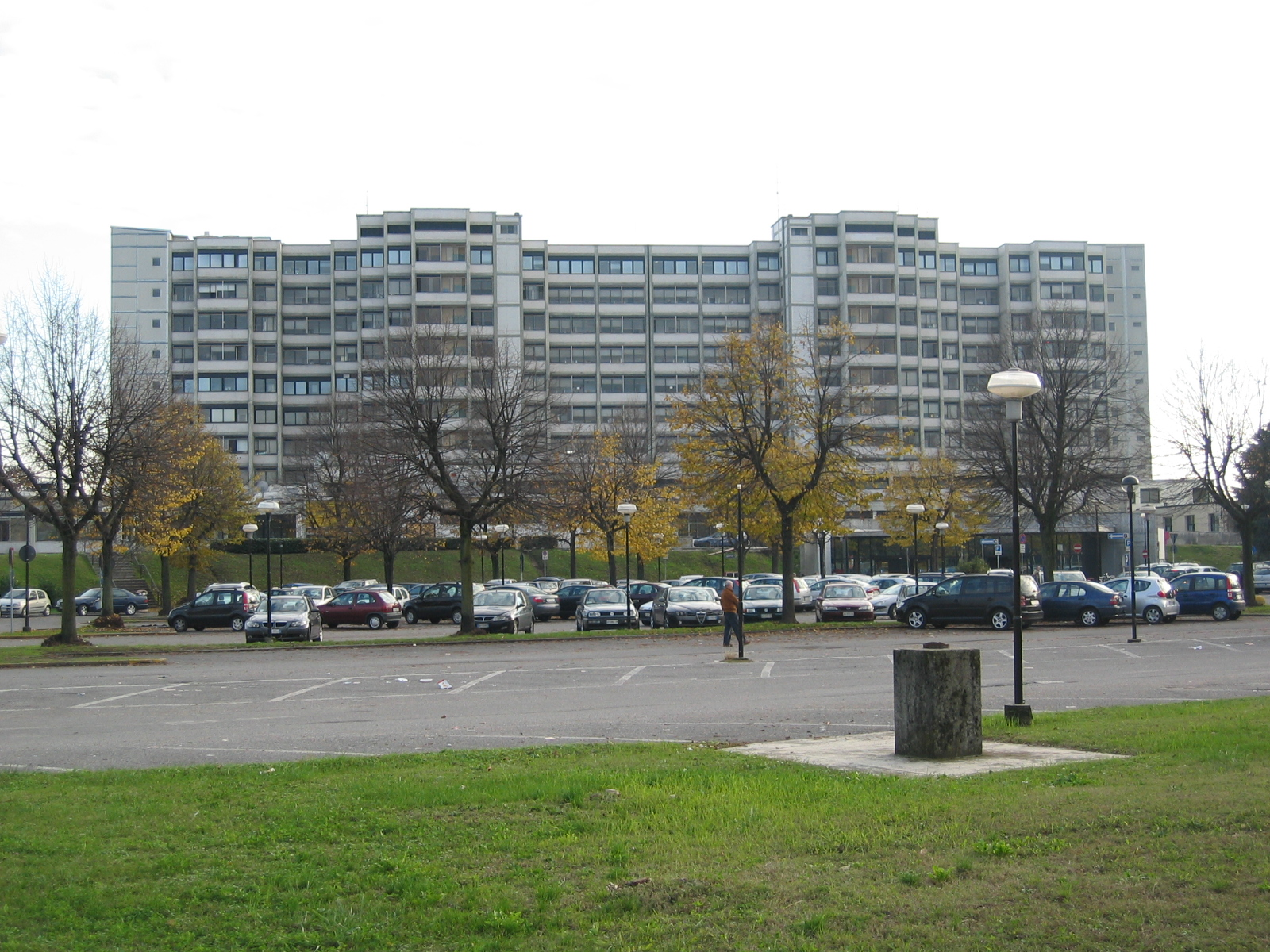
Treviglio-Caravaggio Hospital

The Treviglio-Caravaggio Hospital, built in 1971 by the municipalities of Treviglio and Caravaggio following the closure of two hospitals, is the largest hospital in the area. The facility, expanded in the early 21st century, heads the ASST Bergamo West. The hospital is served by a helipad.

A branch of the Bergamo court had previously been located in the municipality, but it closed in 2013.

== Culture ==
=== Traditions and folklore ===
Among the main traditional events held in the municipality are:

- Patronal feast of Our Lady of Tears: Held on the last day of February with a solemn Mass led by the Cardinal of Milan at the sanctuary in the presence of civil authorities. The celebration marks the town's deliverance from destruction, attributed to the intervention of the Virgin Mary.
- Patronal feast of Saint Martin: Celebrated on 11 November.
- The medieval dinner is held at the end of June in the cloister of the library, which was formerly a hospital and, earlier, a monastery. The dinner is served by participants in historical costumes, and food is consumed strictly by hand. Guests may participate in historical attire upon request.
- The Festival of Saint Anne has been held since 2001 during the last weekend of July in Garibaldi Square.
- Historical parade "Miracol si grida": Held on the first Sunday of March (or the second in case of bad weather) in the historic center, starting from the main square with four processions heading toward the four city gates, then reuniting in the square and proceeding to the sanctuary square. The processions conclude with a performance by flag throwers and a return to Garibaldi Square.

== Sights ==
=== Religious architecture ===
==== Basilica of Saint Martin and Saint Mary of the Assumption ====
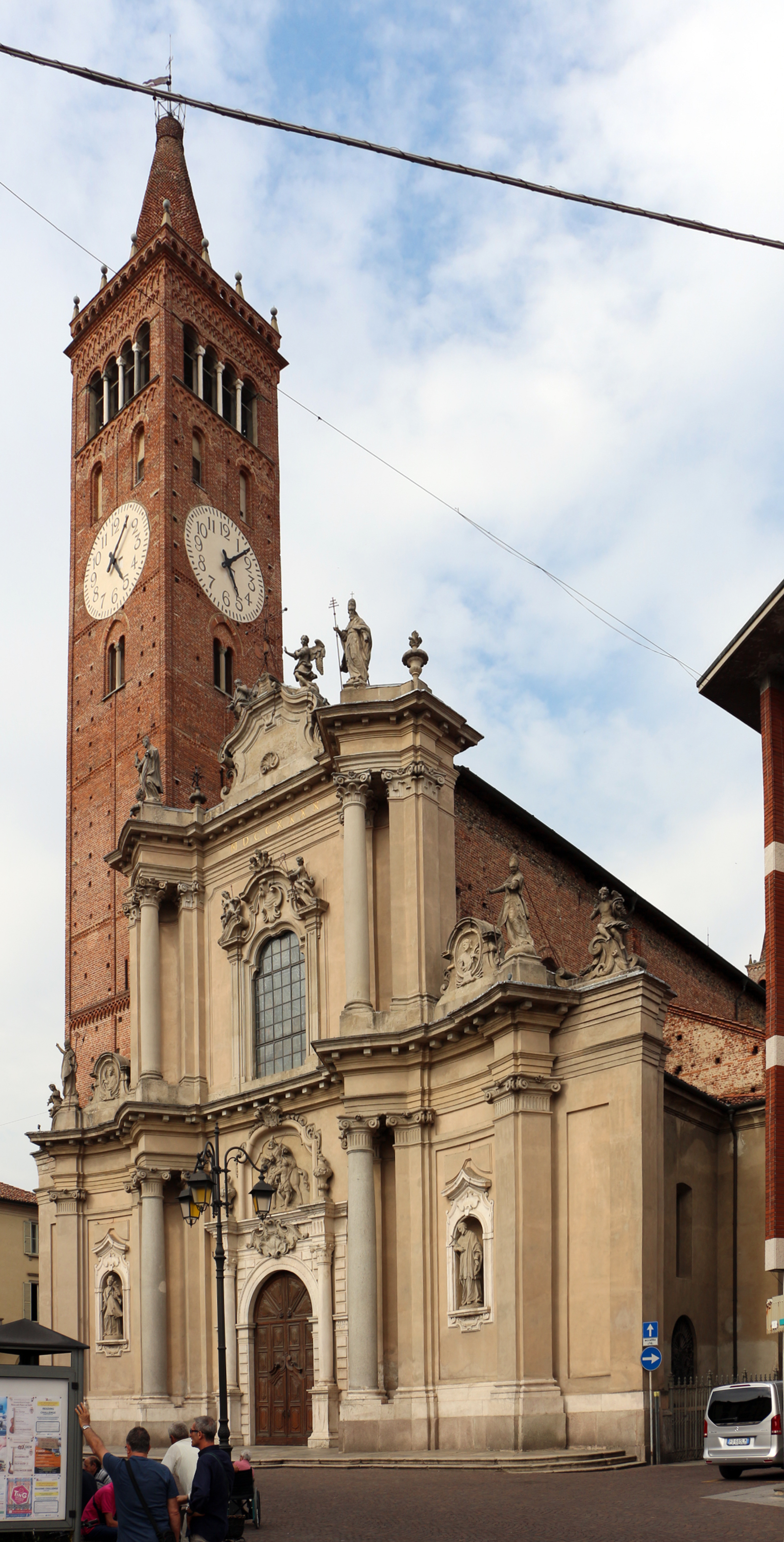
The Basilica of Saint Martin and the bell tower

Constructed in 1008 on the site of a pre-Romanesque church dedicated to the Assumption of Mary, the basilica underwent several expansions over the centuries. In 1482, it was enlarged and remodeled in the Lombard Gothic style, and in the 1500s, it was enriched with works by Gian Paolo Cavagna. The current Baroque facade, designed by architect Giovanni Ruggeri, dates to 1740.

The interior, with three naves and five side chapels, houses frescoes and paintings by Nicola Moietta, the Galliari brothers, Gian Paolo Cavagna, Camillo Procaccini, the Danedi de' Montalti, Molinari, and Manetta. The most renowned work is the polyptych of Saint Martin by Bernardo Zenale and Bernardino Butinone, created between 1485 and 1490, considered a masterpiece of 15th-century Lombard art.

Adjacent to the basilica is the civic tower, a Lombard Gothic bell tower built around 1008. Standing 60 meters tall, it is the quintessential symbol of the city, visible from kilometers away. Shared by the church and the municipality after years of dispute due to its dual civic and religious roles, it was originally separate from the basilica but later connected. Historically, it served military purposes, signaling dangers to neighboring municipalities.

On August 30, 2008, Poste Italiane issued a postage stamp commemorating the millennium of the bell tower, featuring an image of it.

==== Sanctuary of the Madonna of Tears ====
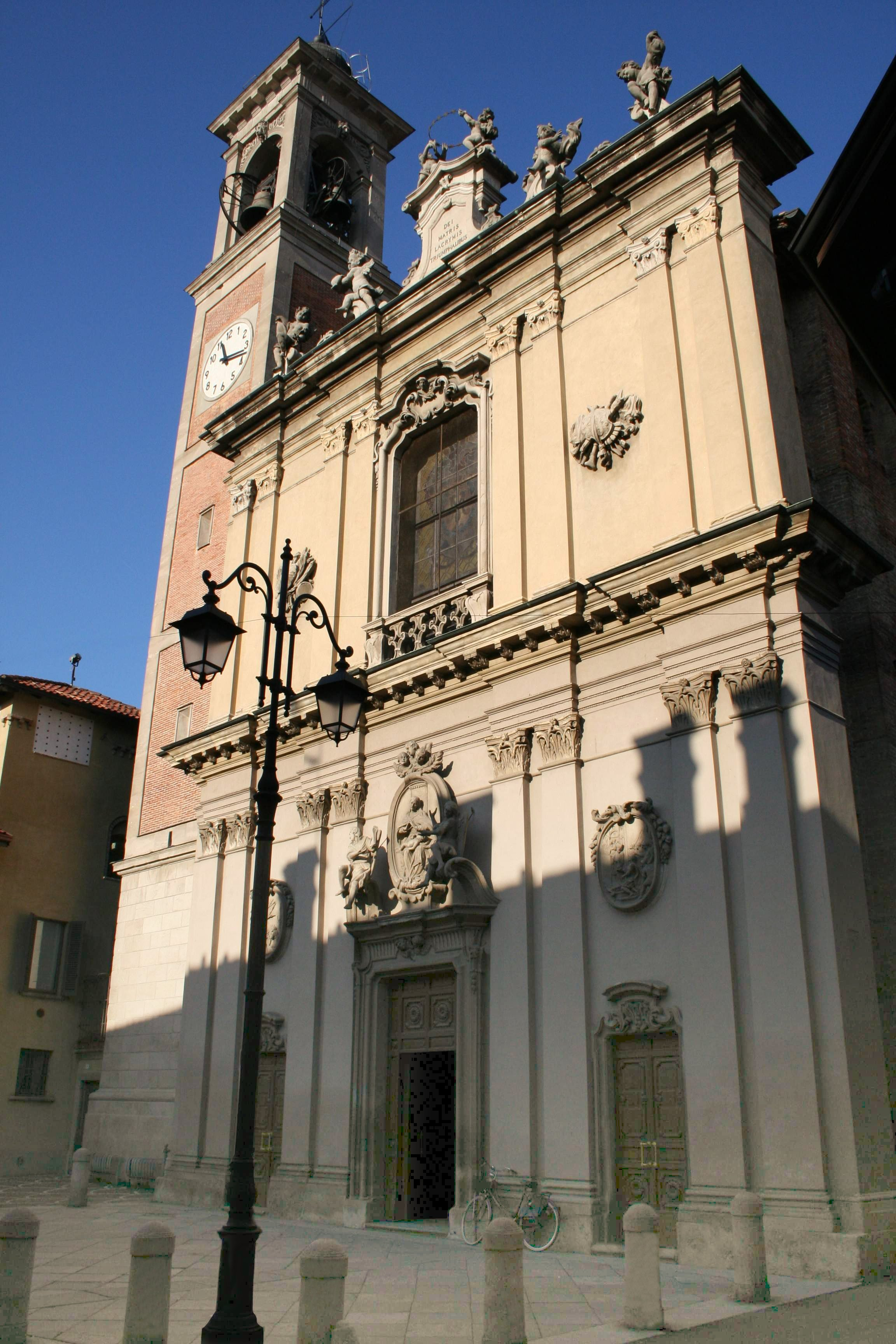
The facade of the Sanctuary of the Madonna of Tears

The Sanctuary of the Madonna of Tears opened for worship on 19 June 1619, when the image of the Madonna of Tears was transferred from the Augustinian monastery, where the miracle occurred, to the main altar, designed by the Caravaggian architect Fabio Mangone. The sword and helmet of the viscount of Lautrec are still preserved beneath the image. The sanctuary houses frescoes and paintings by Molinari, the Galliari brothers, Cresseri, Montalti, and Bernardino Butinone.

On 14 January 1912, Cardinal Andrea Carlo Ferrari consecrated Monsignor Pompeo Ghezzi as bishop of Sansepolcro in the sanctuary. Ghezzi, previously a canon curate in Treviglio, was noted for his significant religious and social apostolate.

==== Church of St. Charles of the Dead ====
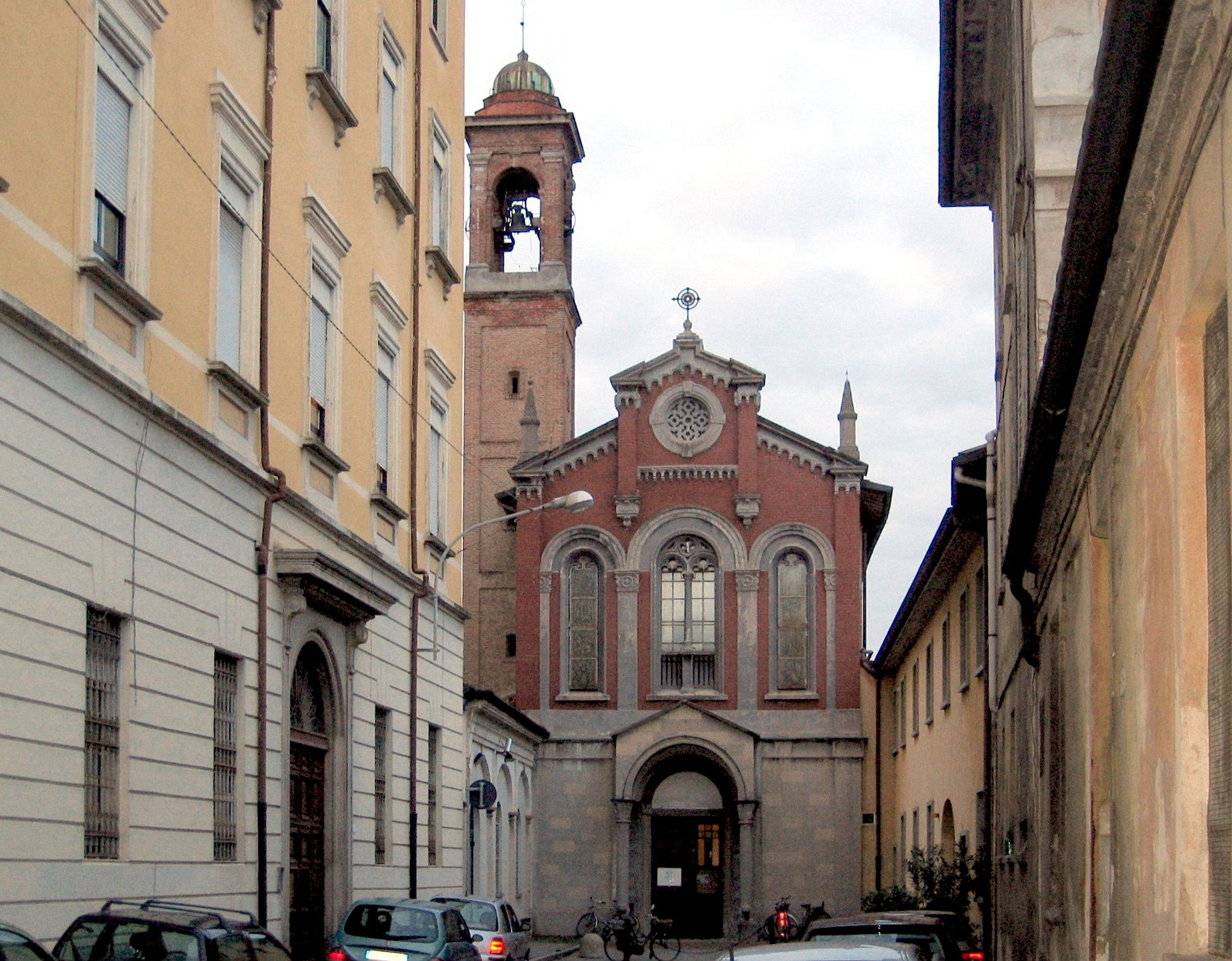
The facade of the Church of Saint Charles of the Dead

Located near the Salesian institute, this church was built in the 17th century on a site known as Gemone, the main cemetery for plague victims in 1630, by Giuseppe Locatelli. In 1668, it was expanded with a chapel dedicated to Saint Francis Xavier. In the 19th century, the building was further modified, including its facade, interior, and the addition of a bell tower.

The church houses the Maria Rossa, previously kept in the former convent church of the Capuchin Friars. The central nave contains two paintings by Giacomo Manetta, the Via Crucis by Nani, stained glass by Carminati, and the Ausiliatrice by Trento Longaretti.

==== Church of Saint Roch ====
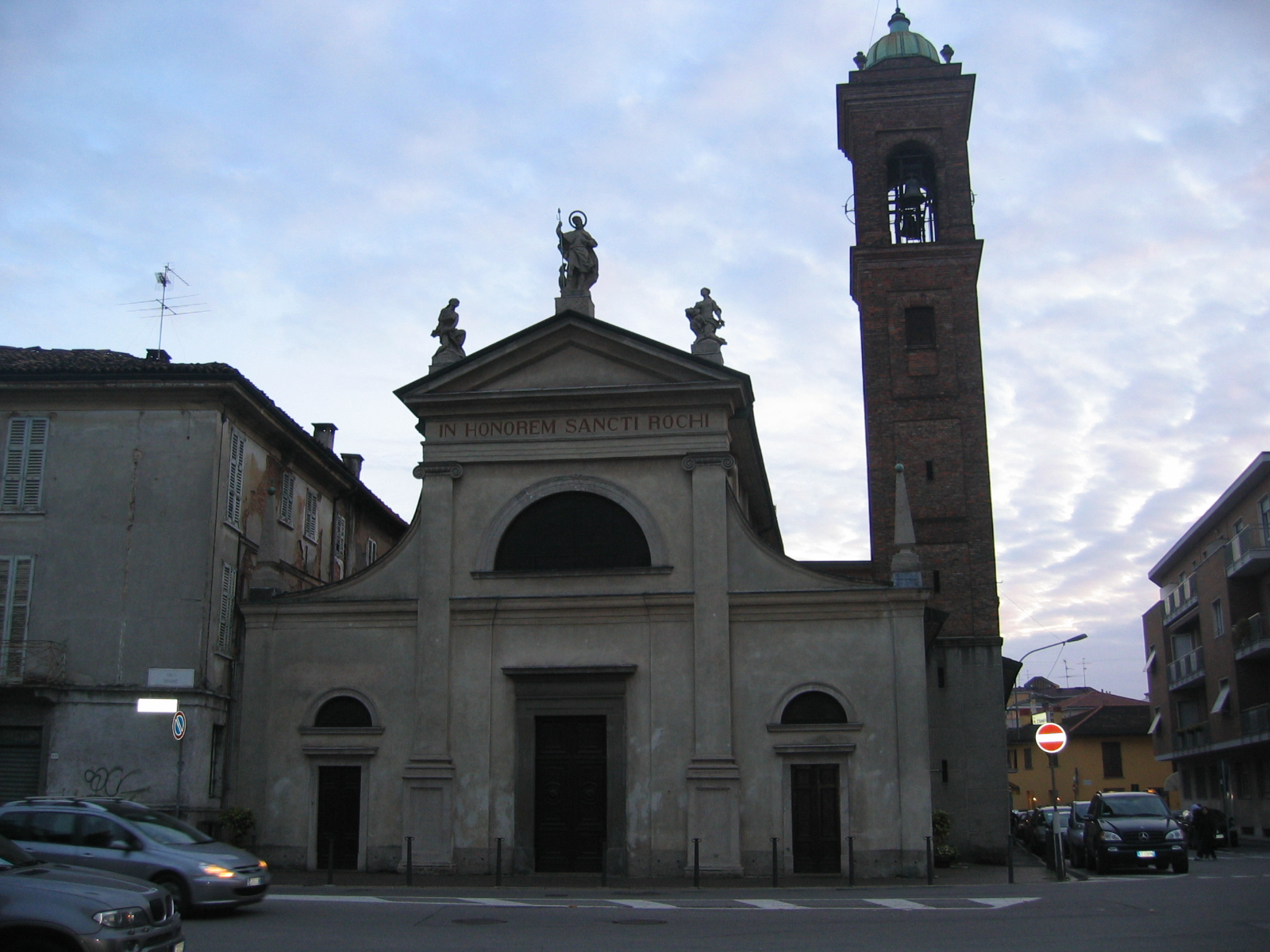
The facade and bell tower of the Church of Saint Roch

Located in Piazza Insurrezione, the Church of Saint Roch is dedicated to the saint, widely venerated in the lower Bergamasque area. Built after the 1529 plague, it honors the saint traditionally invoked against the plague.

==== Church of Saint Peter the Apostle ====
The Church of Saint Peter the Apostle is located in the northern part of the city, an area that transitioned from agricultural to residential use starting in the 1960s. A chapel dedicated to Saint Peter was inaugurated in 1971 and is now used as an oratory hall. However, due to population growth, a larger structure was deemed necessary. The new church, designed in 1989 and completed in 1993, features a square plan with an east-west orientation. It has three naves, with the central nave being taller than the lateral ones. The gabled facade includes a pronaos-like structure with a pitched roof supported by two pillars. The western wall curves symmetrically with the apse, adorned with a large mosaic depicting the calling of St. Peter, created in 1997 by Italo Peresson based on a design by Trento Longaretti.

The church overlooks the modern Piazza Paolo VI and is accompanied by parish facilities and a bell tower.

==== Church of Saint Zeno ====
The Church of Saint Zeno, located northeast of the historic center, is named after the ancient church of Saint Zeno in the village of Cusarola, one of the three villae that formed Treviglio. Housed in a renovated warehouse, the modern structure is surrounded by olive trees. Light enters through colorful stained glass windows by Tito Toneguzzo and sons, based on sketches by Trento Longaretti, depicting biblical scenes. The building, featuring a portico at the front, was constructed in the 1970s as the surrounding area developed into a new neighborhood. It was consecrated on Sunday, 18 October 1981, by Cardinal Carlo Maria Martini.

==== Cemetery ====
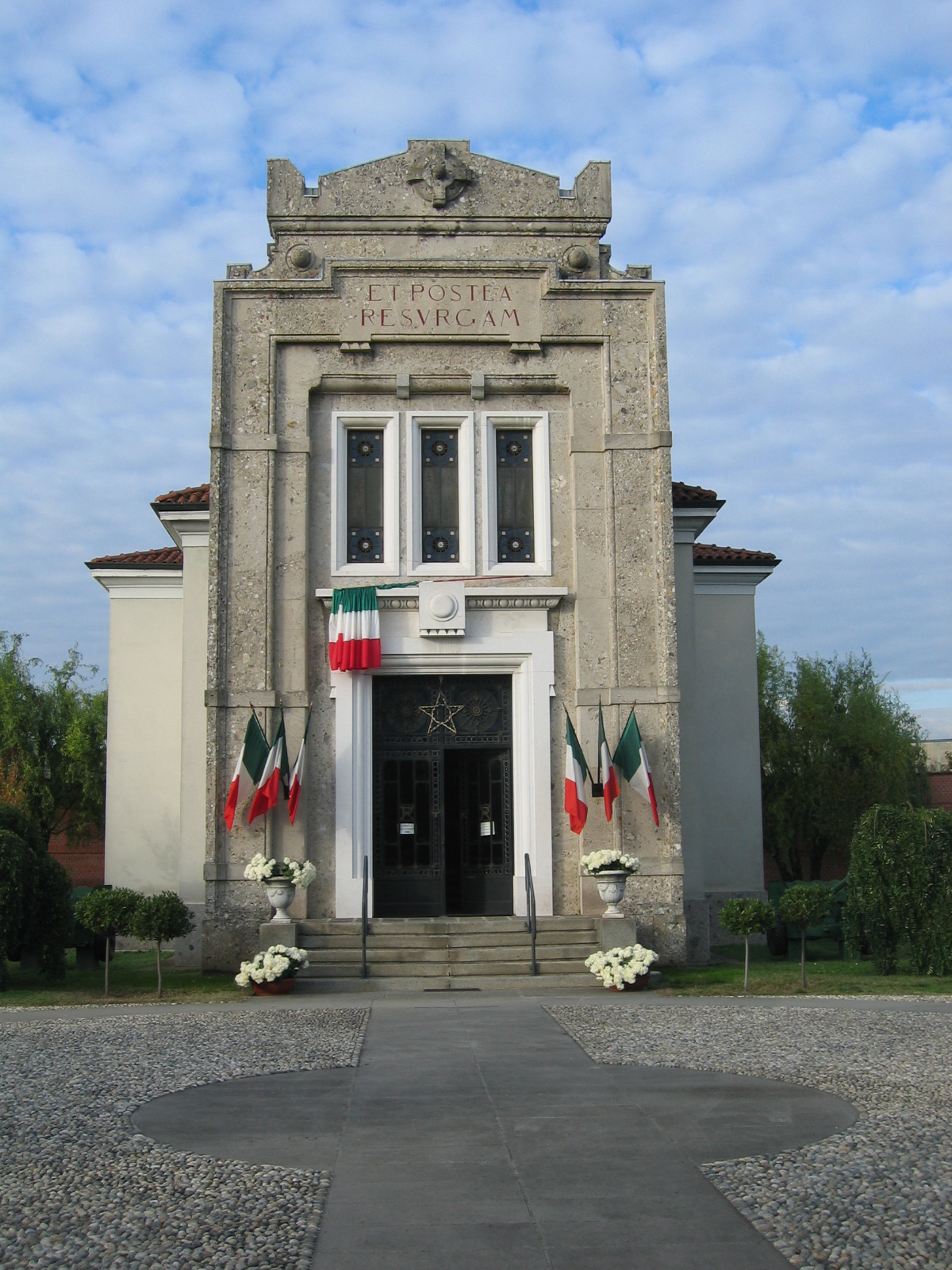
The chapel of the fallen in Treviglio's cemetery

The municipal cemetery, located in the eastern part of the municipality on Via Abate Crippa, has a roughly rectangular layout along an east-west axis. Its entrance is on the southern side, with a semicircular mortuary chapel dedicated to the fallen on the northern side.

Beyond standard tombs and columbaria, the cemetery features examples of Art Nouveau-style funerary art, including family chapels and sculptures adorning certain tombs. Notable burials include those of Giacinto Facchetti and Ambrogio Portaluppi.

==== Former Church of Saint Maurice ====
Recently uncovered, the Church of Saint Maurice was incorporated into a cascina in the 19th century. Along with the churches of Saint Zeno and Saint Eutropius, it is among the city's oldest, tied to the Roman-era villages that formed the village in the Early Middle Ages. Specifically, Saint Maurice corresponds to the Lombard village of Portoli.

Located between the PIP 1 and 2 industrial zones in a field near the railway overpass and the Milan-Venice railway, the church stands where the Roman villa of Portoli once existed, yielding archaeological finds. Historian Emanuele Lodi dates its founding to 725; Baroque features were added to the structure during renovations that took place in the 17th century.

==== Other churches ====
Other churches include:

- The Chapel of the Miracle, part of the Augustinian convent until 1900;
- Church of the Sacred Heart of Jesus in Battaglie;
- Church of the Most Holy Redeemer;
- Church of the Holy Name of Mary, the parish church of Geromina;
- Church of the Transfiguration;
- Church of Saint Francis, the main church of the western neighborhood, built in the 1980s;
- Church of Saint Jerome and Saint Francis in Castel Cerreto;
- Church of Saint Joseph, within the orphanage complex on Via Casnida;
- Church of the Saint Mary of the Annunciation, the parish church of the convent;
- Church of the Infant Mary, within the Collegio degli Angeli;
- Chapel of the Madonna of the Alpini, located in the Roccolo Park;
- Former Church of Saint Martha, now in ruins in the northern zone.

=== Civil architecture ===
Palazzo Pirovano

A building of significant artistic value, located in the city's heart opposite the Sanctuary of the Madonna of Tears. Renowned for its striking beauty and historical prestige, it once housed the Galliari brothers. The palace, protected by cultural heritage organizations, features a grand Baroque-style entrance hall leading to a garden with an elegant fountain, reminiscent of a Roman domus. Its rooms are adorned with frescoes and intricate ancient decorations.

Casa Della Piazza

Known as the pilgrims' hospice, Casa Della Piazza faces Piazza Manara, situated between the basilica and the municipal palace. Its facade displays coats of arms and traces of ancient openings framed by brickwork. It was named after Simone Della Piazza, who lived there in the 16th century. Upon his death without heirs in 1529, he willed it to serve as a hospice for pilgrims.

Casa Bacchetta

Located on the southern side of the street, this house features a courtyard frescoed by the Galliari brothers, preserving its original appearance.

Casa Semenza

This house boasts a painted facade and frescoes in its interior rooms.

Palazzo Silva

A distinguished palace on Via Galliari, valued for both its architecture and interior frescoes. Built in the 14th century and originally owned by the Donati family, it now houses the Proloco Treviglio and the Gera d'Adda tourist information office. Its Baroque-style entrance leads to a spacious courtyard surrounded by a ground-floor portico and a first-floor loggia with columns. The interior features large fireplaces with stucco decorations and coffered wooden ceilings with traces of 17th-century polychrome paintings. The central hall on the ground floor is notable for its mythological and allegorical frescoes on the ceiling. Two first-floor rooms in the western wing are entirely frescoed with sacred themes from the Old and New Testament and allegories of virtue and the liberal arts, painted on finely crafted wooden ceilings. A church dedicated to Saint Christopher, once located at the rear (on Via Sant'Agostino), was restored and embellished in the 17th century by the Donati family.

Workers' Houses

The upper part of Via Portaluppi is occupied by workers' houses, two stories high with gardens at the rear, designed to keep workers occupied and curb social issues such as alcoholism. The street is named after Monsignor Ambrogio Portaluppi, who, through the future rural bank, supported public works aligned with Rerum Novarum. A cascina called Santissimo is also located at the rear, built in the early 20th century.

Former monastery of Benedictine nuns

The former Monastery of the Benedictine nuns was built around the Church of St. Peter, constructed in 1037. In 1499, it became a convent of the Poor Clares. From the end of the 18th century until the present day, it has housed the Hospital of Santa Maria.

Municipal Palace

The core of the current municipal palace, documented as the pallatium novum communitatis in 1269, was completed in 1300. Initially featuring a balcony and two stories, it was fully renovated in 1582. In the 1700s, it was joined to the adjacent Church of Saint Joseph, built by the confraternity in 1509, preserving its elegant portico. The building was raised by one floor in 1873 and has undergone several restorations, particularly after the post-war period, without structural changes. Traces of the confraternity's church remain, notably the dome with its original frescoes.

=== Military architecture ===
Former Military District

Treviglio once had a military district, now repurposed for social activities, though its courtyard layout remains recognizable.

Walls and moat

The walls built during Venetian rule were demolished between the 19th and 20th century as the city expanded, though they shaped the urban layout of the historic center. Only a height difference near the sanctuary remains visible. The moat skirting the historic center, once fed by the Mulina canal, lies buried beneath the inner ring road.

=== Other ===
Votive shrines

Numerous votive shrines, significant places of worship with deep-rooted traditions, dot the city. Historically, they served as landmarks for identifying zones and streets before formal toponymy was established.

Madonna of Milk

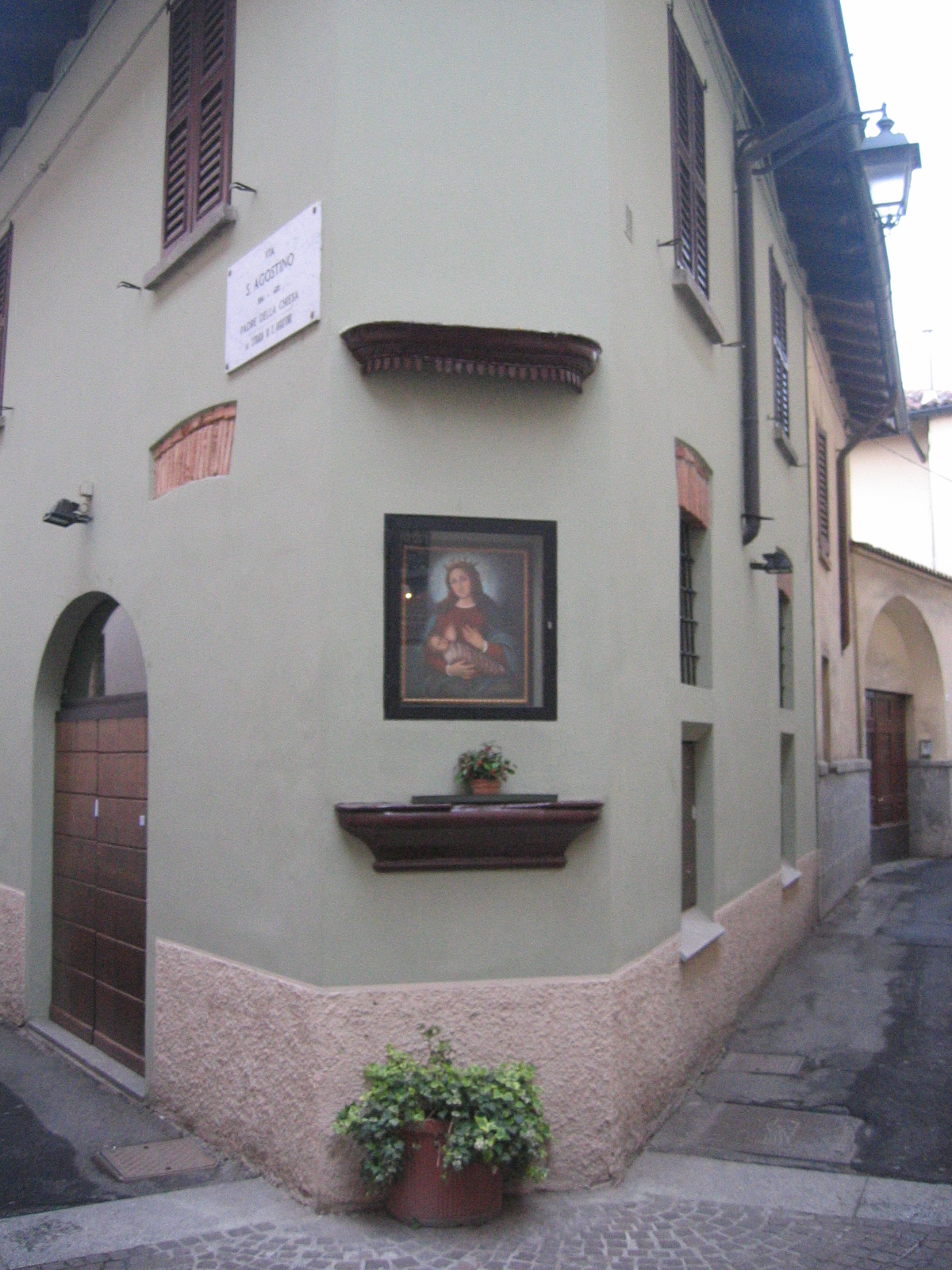
The Madonna of Milk

At the intersection of Via Municipio and Via Sant'Agostino, a votive shrine depicting the Madonna of Milk, painted by Giacomo Manetta, stands. According to local tradition, new mothers visited the shrine to pray for abundant milk for their newborns, giving rise to its name. Since 1987, the original canvas painting has been removed for safekeeping and replaced with a faithful reproduction.

The Gatta and the Dispute with Caravaggio

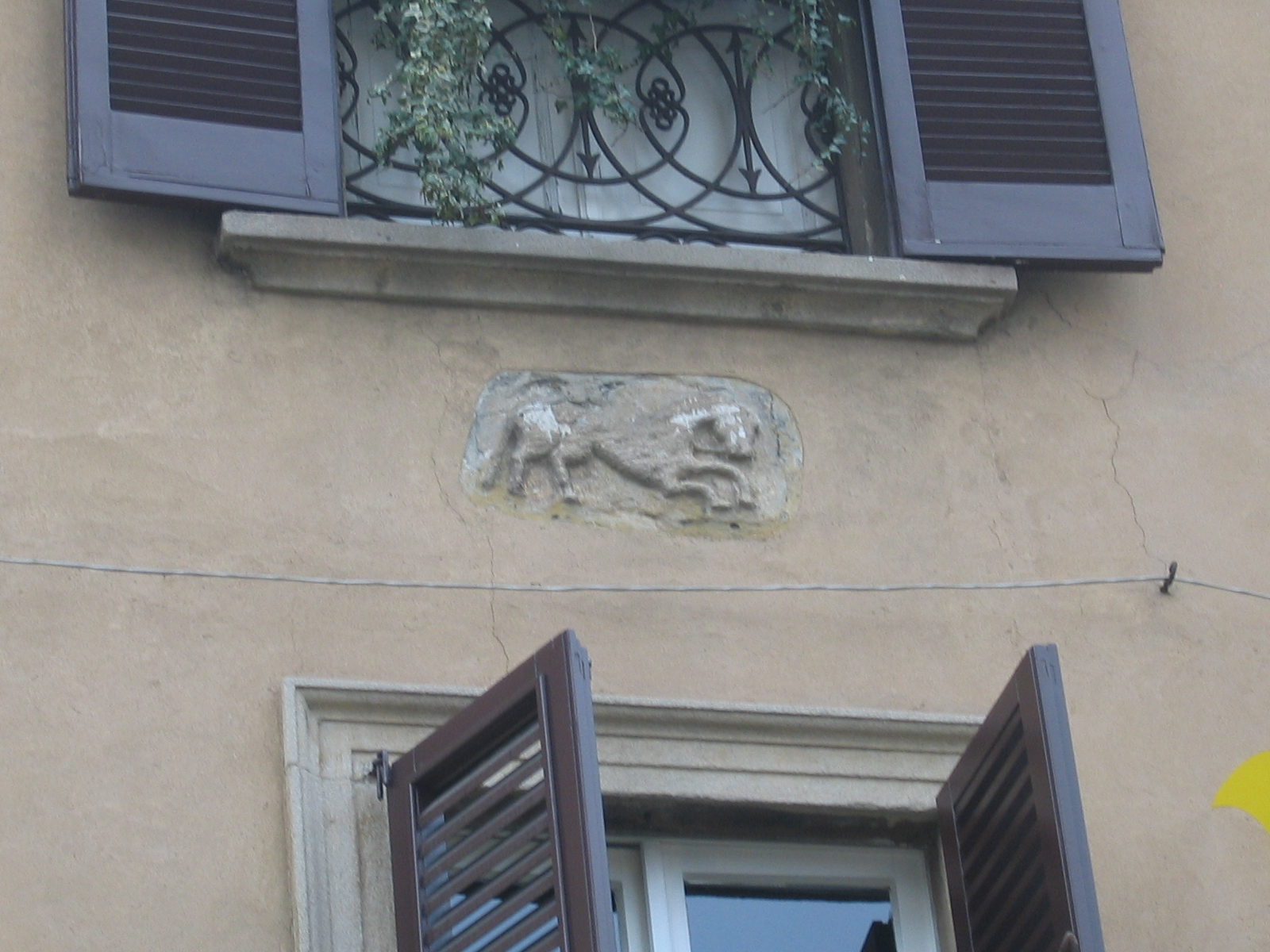
The Gatta, symbol of the dispute between Treviglio and Caravaggio

Piazza Manara is also known for the Gatta, a small stone bas-relief, originally a boundary marker. The bas-relief depicts a horse, which is known in the Bergamasque dialect as a gatèl, hence the name.

The Gatta was long a source of contention with neighboring Caravaggio, discovered at their border in 1393. This sparked a rivalry so intense that Saint Bernardino of Siena intervened to preach peace. The Gatta became a source of pride for Treviglio, with the original, once embedded in an alley of Via Messaggi, now preserved in the civic museum. A copy is displayed on the palace facade opposite the Basilica of Saint Martin and Saint Mary of the Assumption.

In 1953, residents of Caravaggio playfully stole the copy, mistaking it for the original. Treviglio reclaimed it after an amusing aerial bombardment of candy, toilet paper rolls, and chickens suspended by parachute, which delighted both sides. The rivalry between Caravaggio's Purselì and Treviglio's Biligòt continues, taking the form of a bocce match in Caravaggio's sports center in the 21st century.

Piazza Manara

Piazza Manara, the city's central square, is dedicated to Milanese patriot Luciano Manara, who stayed in a building facing the square. It is flanked by the Basilica of Saint Martin and Saint Mary of the Assumption and the municipal palace. To the southwest, it opens onto the larger, elongated Piazza Garibaldi. Named after Manara in the mid-19th century, it was previously called Piazza San Martino and, in medieval times before the basilica's construction, Piazza della Comunità.

The L-shaped square connects to four streets leading to the city's historic gates: Via Roma, Via Fratelli Galliari, Via Verga, and Via San Martino. Other adjacent streets include Vicolo Teatro, a closed alley once behind the social theater, and Via Municipio, which runs alongside the municipal palace for half its length. Nearby stands the Gothic house, built around 1300 with smooth, rounded stones from the Adda River bed, recently restored.

Sanctuary Square

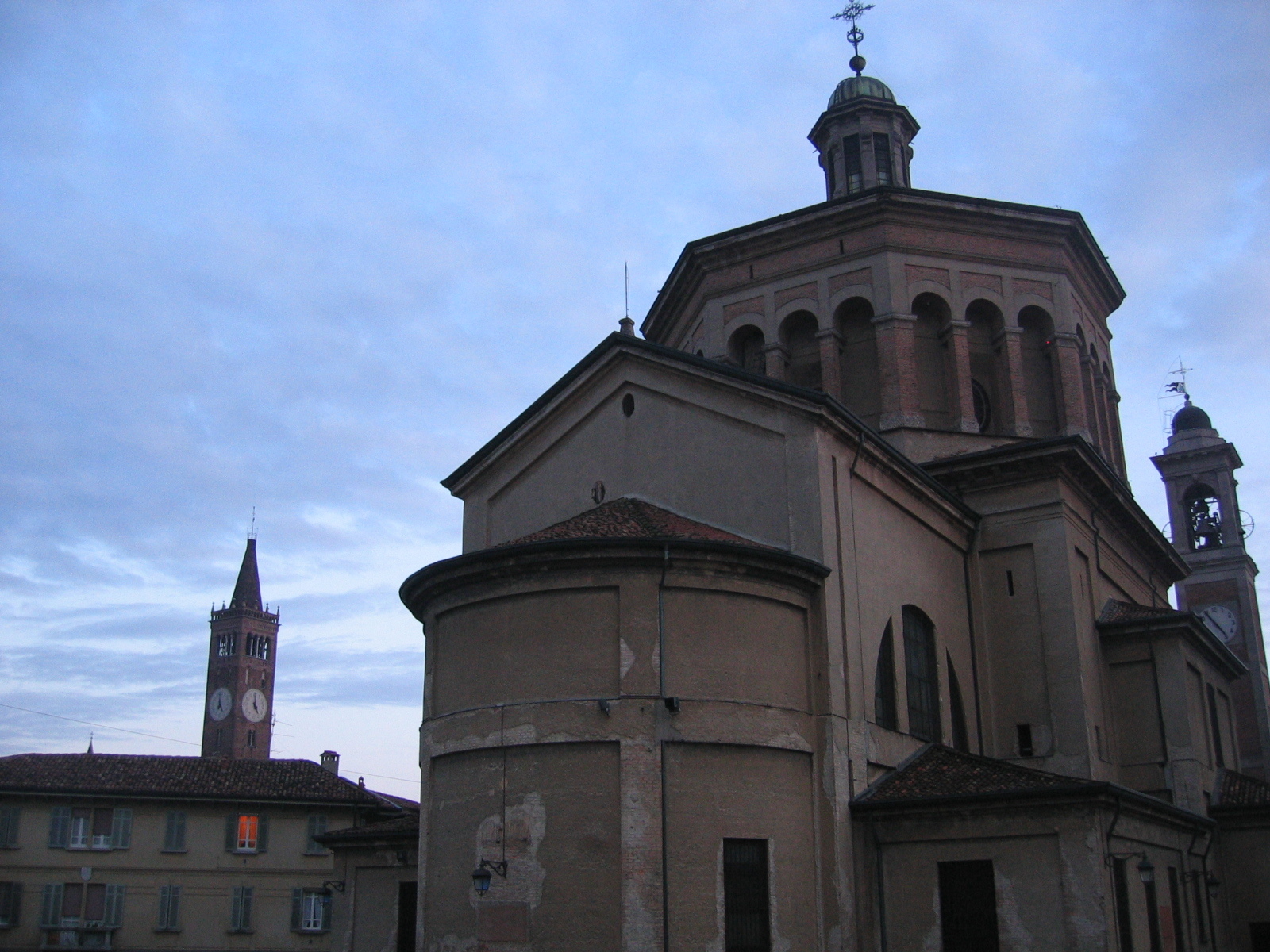
The rear of the Sanctuary and the Treviglio bell tower

The square is home to one of the three obelisks erected in the city in memory of the victims of the plague of 1630. This obelisk was previously located at the end of the Mulina canal on Felice Cavallotti street.

It is also the site of the Filodrammatici Theatre, characterized by its Art Nouveau style, the convent of the Daughters of the Church, and the remaining part of the Augustinian monastery, dating back to the 11th century. According to Catholic tradition, the miracle of the weeping Madonna took place in its church on February 28, 1522.

The Augustinian monastery no longer houses any religious order, as it was suppressed with the arrival of Napoleonic revolutionaries. The portico connecting to the Sanctuary and the Ecce Homo church were removed in the early 20th century during the expansion of the sanctuary, which led to the creation of the square itself.

=== Archaeological sites ===
Sites in the historic center

Some artifacts have also been found in the historic center, particularly at the base of the Basilica of San Martino and Santa Maria Assunta.

In Via Verga, artifacts from the Diocletian era were discovered, including an amphora containing 30 kilograms of coins. These coins were likely hidden underground to evade the tax increases imposed by the emperor.

San Maurizio Church Field

Among the main archaeological sites is the field surrounding the San Maurizio Church, where numerous archaeological artifacts have been found.

Other sites

Other artifacts have been found in the fields around the city, particularly near the frazioni of Castel Cerreto and Pezzoli and the cascine of Peliza and San Zeno.

=== Museums ===
The city is home to the SAME Museum, dedicated to narrating the history of agricultural mechanization in Italy and Europe through the display of items related to the SAME Deutz-Fahr group, including tractors and various mechanical components. The institution shares its space with the SDF Historical Archive and is part of the Lombardy Design Museums Circuit.

=== Natural areas ===
Chestnut Forest

The chestnut forest near the hamlet of Castel Cerreto is one of the few remaining forests from the ancient era of deforestation for wood and cultivated land. The forest features various plant species, including chestnut trees, with information panels.

Parco del Roccolo

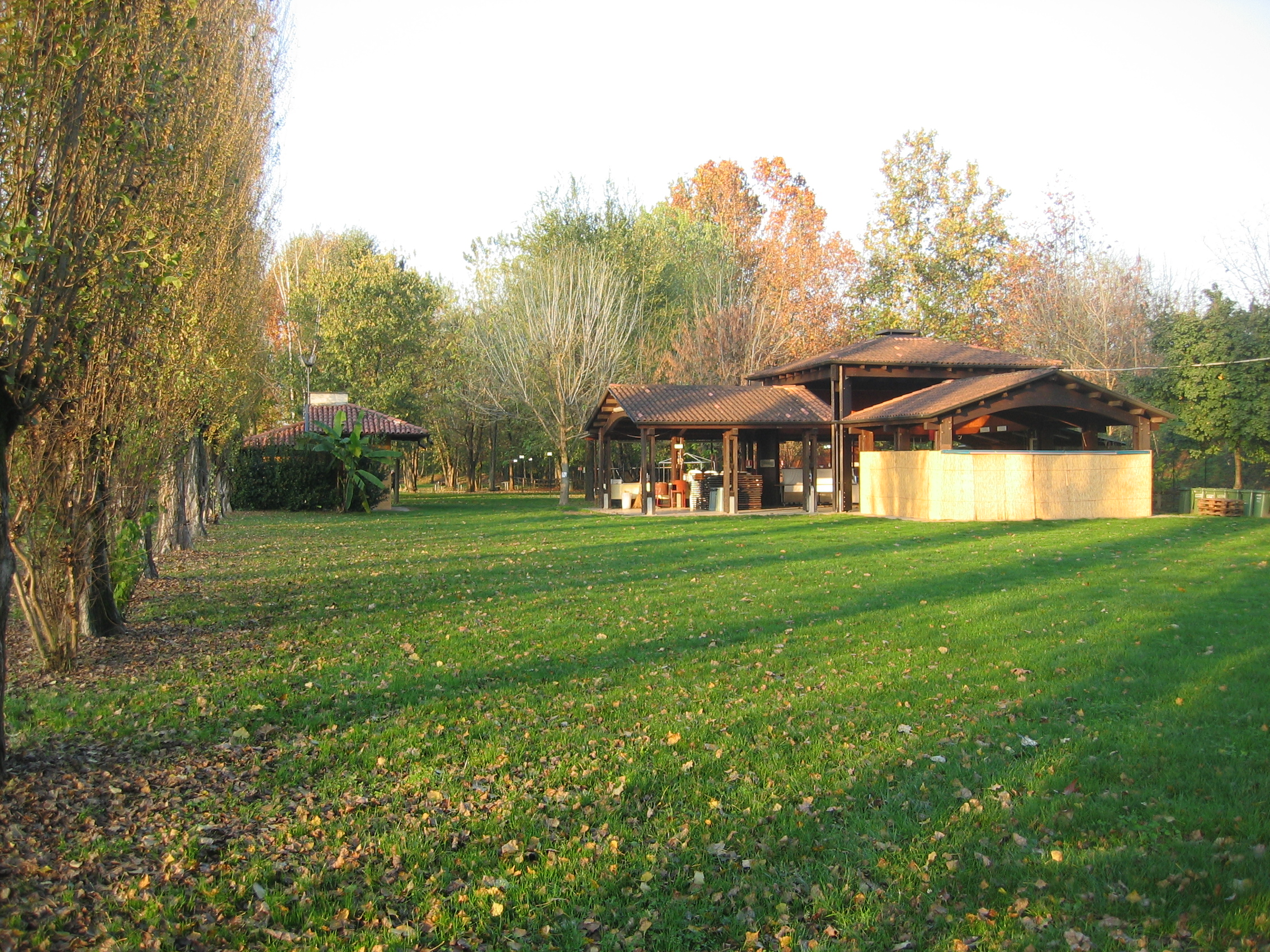
The Roccolo seen from the main entrance

The Parco del Roccolo is a wildlife garden of approximately 43,000 m² located in the southwest area of Treviglio, along Via del Bosco, dedicated to recreational and sports activities, as well as occasional liturgical activities. It is also possible to take educational-naturalistic tours in the summer.

The park is home to numerous species of trees and a canal crossed by several small bridges. The canal originates from a trough and flows at the foot of the picturesque Chapel of the Madonna of the Alpini. The chapel is open occasionally and is used only for the most important liturgical celebrations.

The Treviglio Alpini group and the Friends of the Parco del Roccolo Association manage the area. They have planted trees and created artificial nests to attract birdlife. These plants will eventually cover the portions of the park that are still uncovered and were acquired from adjacent fields.

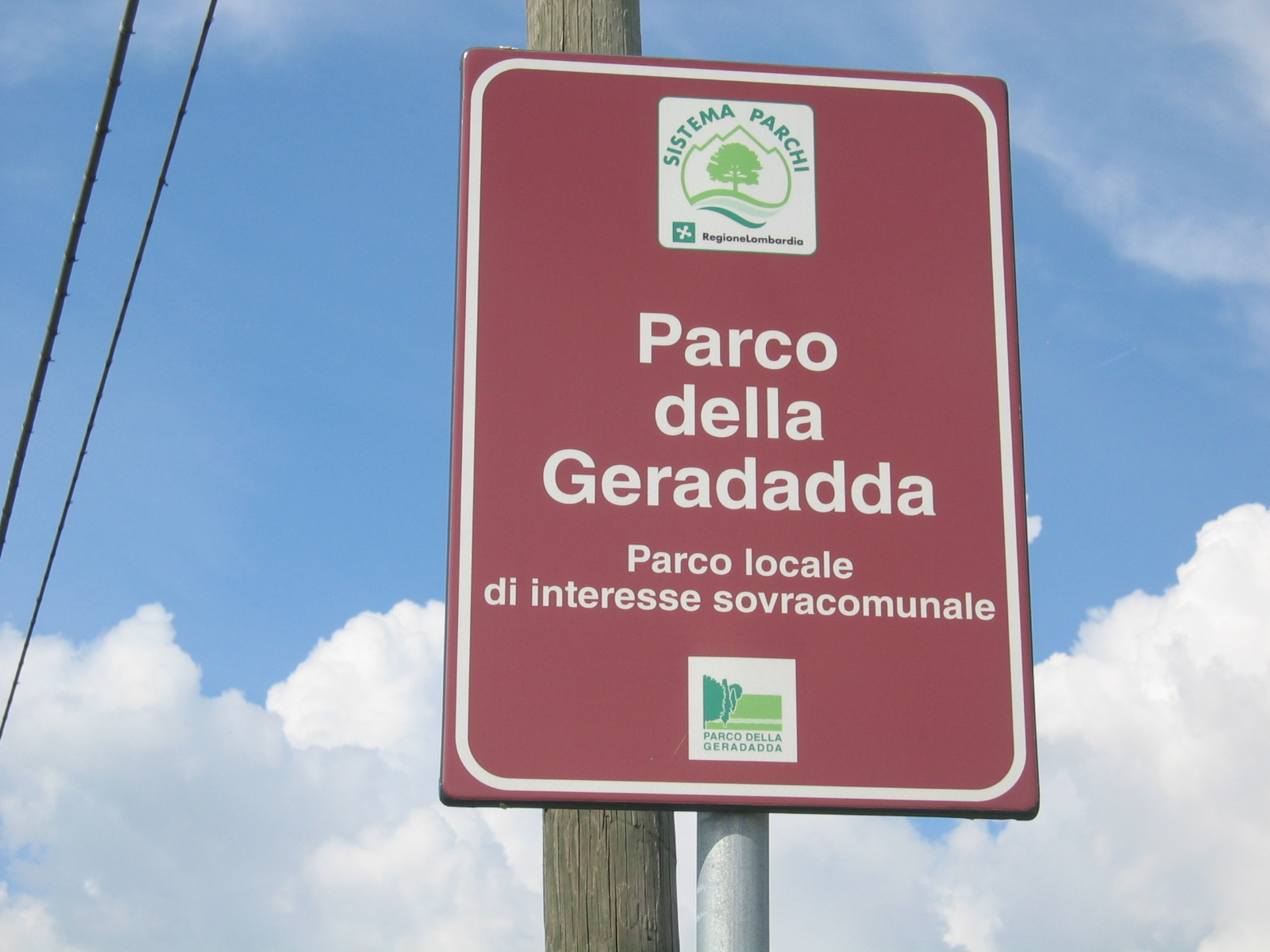
The sign marking the start of the park is located along the SP141 exit from Treviglio.

Parco della Gera d'Adda

It is a local park of supra-municipal interest currently being established that extends across the northwestern part of the municipality and then into the neighboring municipalities of Arcene, Canonica d'Adda, Casirate d'Adda, Ciserano, Fara Gera d'Adda, and Pontirolo Nuovo. Since 2016, Treviglio has chaired the council meetings, assuming the role previously held by Fara Gera d'Adda as the lead municipality.

== Education ==
=== Archives and libraries ===
Treviglio has a municipal historical archive and a historical collection of texts available at the library for on-site consultation only.

This collection includes two ancient fonds and four historical archives. The ancient fonds include those of Tommaso Grossi and Carlo Cameroni, while the archives include:

- The archive of Italian emigration in Piedmont, also linked to Carlo Cameroni, including letters exchanged with Camillo Benso di Cavour, Massimo d'Azeglio, Domenico Berti, and Giovanni Torti;
- The archive of the Municipal Assistance Agency (ECA);
- The archive of the Santa Maria Hospital;
- The archive of the male mutual aid society.

==== Central library ====
The library was founded in 1861 following the donation of 4,000 volumes by Carlo Cameroni. The collection grew with donations from Gian Battisti Crippa, Andrea Verga, Giacomo Sangalli, Giuseppe Grossi, and Agostino Cameroni, and currently holds 75,000 books, including 10,000 from the historical collection stored in the archive.

==== Other libraries ====
The central library serves as the hub of a coordinated library system, which includes four peripheral libraries under its management, located in the western and northern zones and in the hamlets of Geromina and Castel Cerreto.

=== Research ===
SAME is among the main organizations conducting research in the field of technology, particularly mechanics.

The university, which is now closed, primarily focused on researching economics, mathematics, and statistics.

=== Schools ===
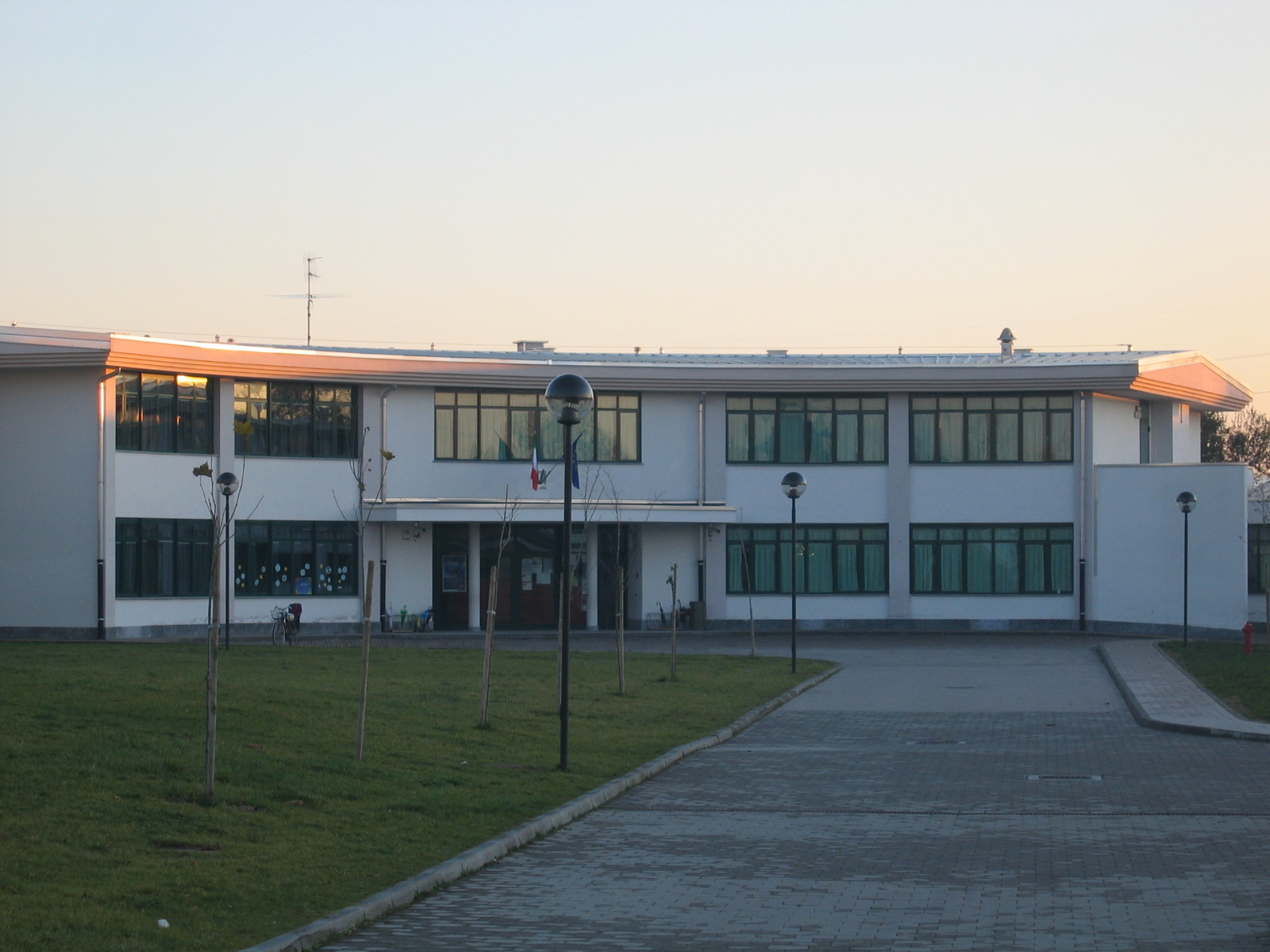
The Geromina school

The Treviglio area offers educational opportunities at all levels, from nursery schools to secondary schools.

Public institutions include four kindergartens, five primary schools, three lower secondary schools, and five upper secondary schools (with various evening courses). Private institutions include two kindergartens, three primary schools, two lower secondary schools, and two upper secondary schools.

The only frazione with a school is Geromina, which has a kindergarten and a primary school.

=== University ===
Treviglio began offering a three-year Bachelor of Science degree program in Business Economics and Administration beginning in the 2004–05 academic year, held at the premises of the Cassa Rurale e Artigiana, which, together with the municipality and the University of Bergamo, funded the project. The program was managed by the latter.

The agreement between the three institutions was based on multi-year contracts. The first five academic years saw just over 400 students enrolled, and in 2007, the first graduates completed the program. In 2008, following the decommissioning of the Baslini plants, there was a proposal to establish a university campus. However, in September 2013, the courses did not resume, and the university was closed.

Additionally, the University of Pavia has offered a nursing degree program at the local hospital for a longer period of time.

=== Museums ===
==== Ernesto and Teresa Della Torre Civic Museum ====
The establishment of the civic museum resulted from two significant art donations by Giovan Battista Dell'Era and, in 1961, by Professor Pier Luigi Della Torre, who, through his will, established a civic art gallery. Two streets in the historic center are named after them.

The museum primarily includes paintings, sculptures, and prints from various periods and is named after Pier Luigi Della Torre's parents, Ernesto and Teresa Pedrazzini. Other significant donations were made by Trento Longaretti, Luigi Cassani, and Tommaso Grossi. Some works originate from the former monastery of San Pietro.

The museum also features an archaeological section in the adjacent "Giuseppe Oggionni" museum and a scientific section with the interactive Explorazione museum in Piazza Mercato.

==== SAME Deutz-Fahr Group Historical Museum ====
The historical museum of the SAME Deutz-Fahr (SDF) group showcases, through textual and photographic materials, key milestones in the history of agricultural mechanization, highlighting innovations introduced by the four major SDF brands. The museum is located within the company's headquarters.

==== Cassa Rurale Art Gallery ====
The art gallery makes its artistic heritage available to municipalities and public and private entities where the Cassa Rurale and its foundation operate. The gallery includes many works by Treviglio painters from different centuries and organizes periodic exhibitions.

== Media ==
=== Press ===
Two weekly newspapers, Il Popolo Cattolico and Il Giornale di Treviglio, are published in Treviglio.

==== 'l Biligot ====
Additionally, there is an annual satirical magazine, 'l Biligot, which features humorous episodes involving local citizens, narrated through poems and nursery rhymes in the Treviglio and Bergamasque dialect. The magazine is published around the Feast of the Madonna delle Lacrime, which is held on February 28.

==== Il Popolo Cattolico ====
Il Popolo Cattolico is a Catholic-oriented weekly founded in 1921 by Monsignor Ambrogio Portaluppi, following the closure of the previous local Catholic newspaper due to influences from the Cremasque left.

The newspaper, one of the few remaining in smaller towns, continued publishing without interruption during the Second World War and is owned by the parish of San Martino.

Il Popolo Cattolico was the starting point for Carmelo Silva, a historical illustrator and satirical cartoonist who was known in the sports world for his work with Il Calcio Illustrato.

It includes a monthly supplement page from Il Galileo, edited by students of the Galileo Galilei secondary school in Caravaggio.

=== Radio ===
==== Radio Zeta and Discoradio ====
Radio Zeta was founded in Treviglio on 6 November 1976, by Angelo Zibetti.

The radio broadcasts in FM on dual frequencies and can be heard in nearly all regions of Northern Italy.

In 1988, Discoradio was established, targeting young audiences with a focus on disco music and house music. It broadcast from premises above the Studio Zeta discotheque in the neighboring municipality of Caravaggio along the state road Treviglio-Caravaggio. Previously, the radio was located in Piazza Insurrezione in Treviglio.

After Zibetti sold the radio station to the RDS Group in 2006, its headquarters were relocated to Milan.

=== Television ===
==== Studio 1 ====
Studio 1 is a local television station established in Treviglio in 1976 but relocated to Cremona in 2006.

=== Art ===
The main Treviglio artists have primarily focused on painting (Zenale, Butinone, Dell'Era, Longaretti, Mombrini, and Manenti) and sculpture (Mombrini and Manenti). The main styles that have influenced local art are Lombard Gothic architecture and Art Nouveau.

The latter is visible not only on the exterior of the theatre but also on many private homes and balconies. A notable area in this regard is the square of the Sanctuary, renovated at the beginning of the 20th century.

=== Theatre ===
==== Filodrammatici Theatre ====
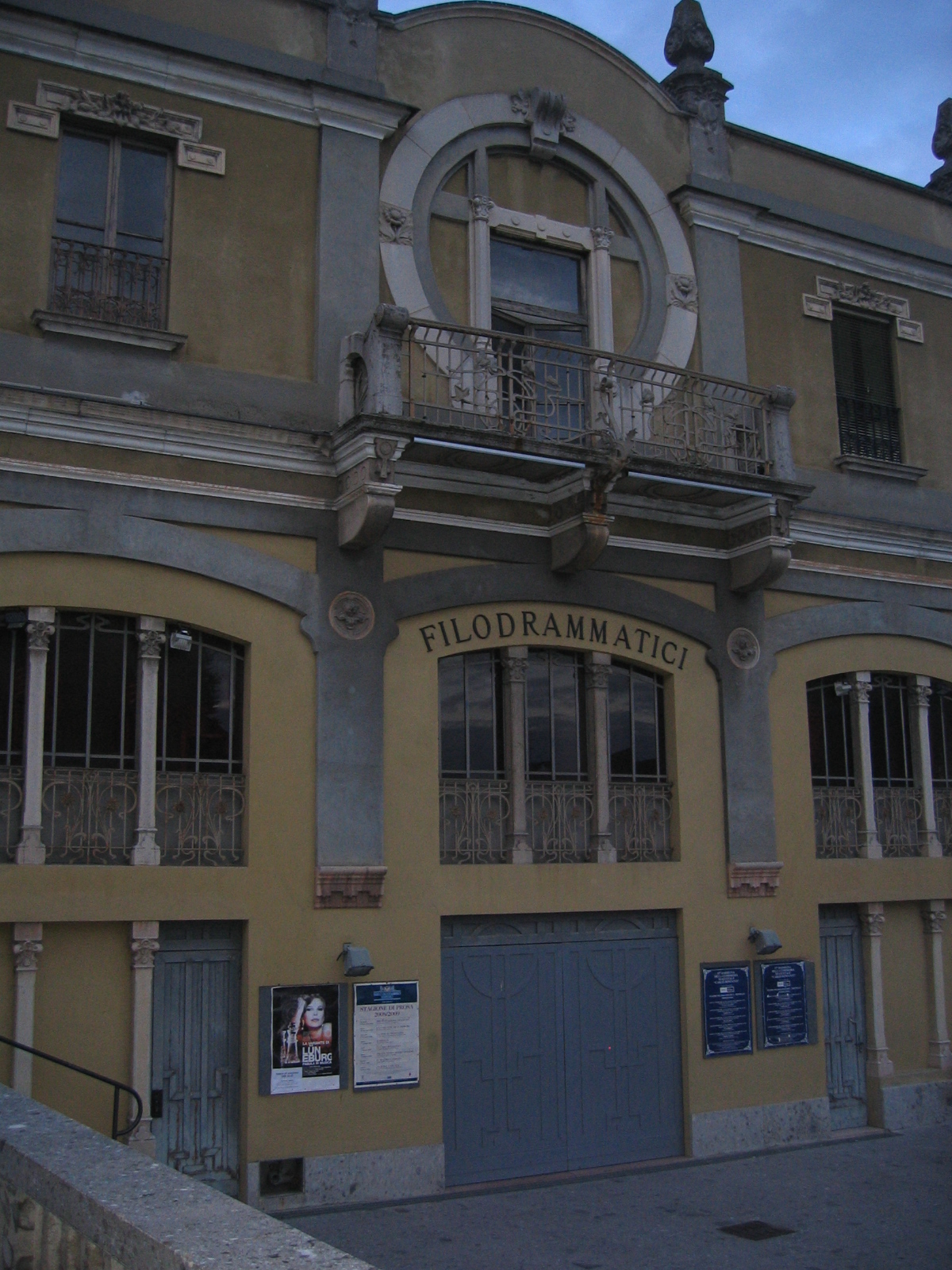
The main entrance of the city theatre

The Filodrammatici Theatre was the city's only public theatre from the demolition of the Teatro Sociale in 1964 until 2015, when it was succeeded by the former UPIM building, where the new Treviglio Theatre (TNT) was opened. Curiously, the secondary street behind the square continues to be called Vicolo del Teatro.

The Filodrammatici Theatre is located in the northwest corner of the Sanctuary square. Designed by Carlo Bedolini in 1898, it was built in the early 20th century in the Art Nouveau style and inaugurated on 15 July 1905.

==== New Treviglio Theatre ====
The New Treviglio Theatre (TNT) was inaugurated in January 2015 and is located in the Treviglio civic center in Piazza Garibaldi, one floor below street level.

=== Cinema ===
Treviglio was the setting for the Palme d'Or-winning film at the Cannes Film Festival The Tree of Wooden Clogs by Ermanno Olmi. The supporting actor Batistì hailed from the municipal hamlet of Castel Cerreto, as did many other non-professional actors. Additionally, a scene set in Milan's Navigli was filmed along Via Cavallotti by the canal.

=== Music ===
The Treviglio City Musical Corps is noteworthy. It was established in 1820 by the Brugnetti family from Treviglio as the "Società Filarmonica della Banda di Treviglio", though the founder's name is unknown. The Philharmonic's first concert took place on 27 February 1822, opening the celebrations for the third centenary of the Miracle of the Madonna delle Lacrime in Treviglio. The Philharmonic also performed in 1846 during the inauguration of the Milan-Treviglio section of the Imperial Royal Milan-Venice Railway and in 1848, when Treviglio celebrated the retreat of Marshal Radetzky from Milan.

In 1872, the musical corps had too many musicians and two conductors, leading to a split into two groups: the Civic Band and the New "Giuseppe Verdi" Philharmonic Orchestra, led by conductor Pietro Martinelli, who died in 1903, after whom a street in the city was named. Both bands performed at funerals, religious processions, and patriotic parades. Following the Catholic Church's non expedit decree in 1874, in which Pope Pius IX declared it unacceptable for Italian Catholics to participate in politics, the clerical faction founded the San Carlo Band in 1896, based at the Salesian Institute. The three bands coexisted, sharing responsibilities until 1914.

After World War I, in 1919, the three bands merged into a single Municipal Band. During the fascist period, the band faced disorganization. The San Carlo Band, reconstituted after World War II, ceased activity. In 1960, its musicians joined the Municipal Band, which became the new Treviglio City Band.

Since 1986, the ensemble has been known as the Treviglio City Musical Corps. In 2000, it participated in the National Competition in Cascina, and in 2001, in the International Flicorno d'oro Competition.

In 2017, the "Ce.S.M. Young Ensemble," a group of musicians from the Corps, participated in a musical project in Saint Petersburg.

The Philharmonic performs numerous concerts in the city, including the characteristic Christmas concert and others during major holidays, and has collaborated with various artists.

The ICAT choir is also based in the city, formed in 1967 as a male choir dedicated to performing traditional and folk songs.

=== Cuisine ===
Treviglio's cuisine is characteristic of the culinary traditions of the Lombard plain.

A signature product is the cake called Turta de Treì, a crumbly shortcrust pastry in a circular shape filled with almonds and butter; it was created in the early 1990s.

=== Events ===
Among the main events held in the municipality are:

- Trevigliopoesia, a poetry festival. The event is held at the end of May and lasts for four days, with participants from around the world.
- The Bassa Bergamasca Agricultural Fair, lasting three days at the end of April, held in the fairground area with the patronage of the municipality of Treviglio, the Province of Bergamo, and the Chamber of Commerce since 1981.

== Urban planning ==
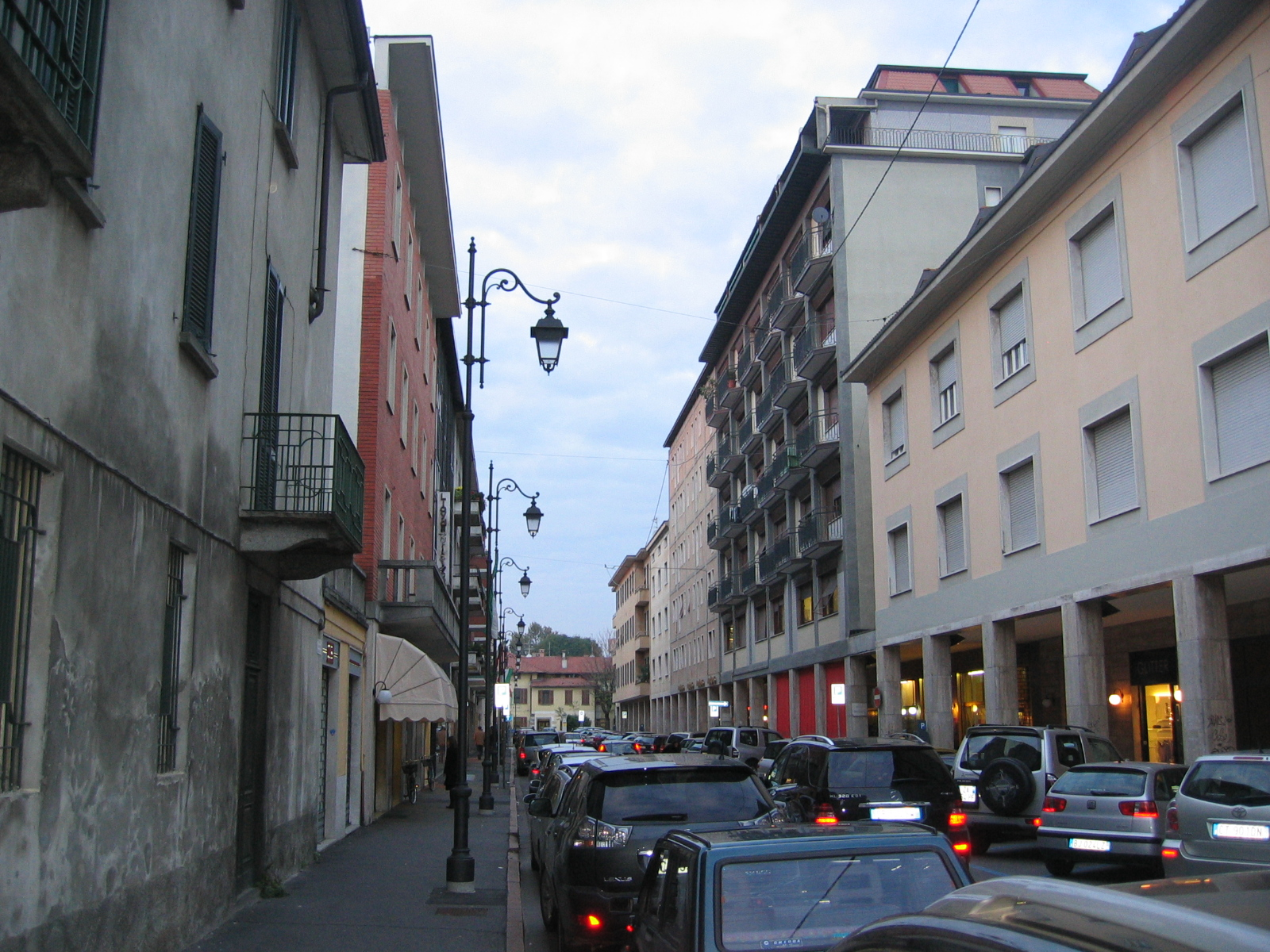
Via Matteotti

=== Structure of the historic center ===
The layout of the historic center is orthogonal, a result of centuriation.

The original defensive core, known as castrum vetus, was located in the current Piazza Manara, Piazza Garibaldi, and Via Galliari, surrounded by a moat, with its entrance at the present-day Vicolo Teatro. Later, it was enclosed by a second set of walls and a triple moat, which stood where the current inner ring road is located.

There were also four towers positioned at the four city gates, oriented toward the four cardinal directions along Via Roma, Via Galliari, Via Verga, and Via San Martino. The streets of the historic center have retained their medieval layout, which is why they are never completely straight but slightly curved to disorient potential enemies. This became more challenging with the construction of the bell tower, which served as a reference point to reach the main square.

=== Historic center ===
The historic center of Treviglio encompasses the area within the inner ring road of Treviglio. In the past, this ring road did not exist, as it was occupied by the moat of the village.

The historic center's orthogonal layout derives from centuriation. It has retained its original structure, although in the early 20th century, the walls were removed to facilitate economic development.

The main streets are still the same as those of the original four gates: Via Galliari, Via Roma, Via Verga, and Via San Martino, along with Via Sangalli, where Porta Stoppa was located, which was walled up with the opening of Porta Nuova in the parallel Via San Martino.

=== Frazioni (localities) ===
==== Battaglie ====
The hamlet of Battaglie is named after the eponymous cascina. The origin of the name is unknown, as no battle is recorded to have taken place there. The historic Bianchi factory and a centuries-old mulberry tree are located within a cascina.

==== Castel Cerreto ====
The hamlet of Castel Cerreto (Serìt in the Bergamasque dialect) is located in the northernmost part of the municipal territory and functions as a relatively autonomous village from the main town. It is primarily an agricultural center in the countryside, with a few hundred inhabitants. The name refers to the residence of the Rozzone, local lords during the Middle Ages.

==== Geromina ====
The church of the Geromina hamlet

The most populous hamlet is Geromina (Girumina in the Bergamasque dialect), located along the road to Canonica d'Adda. Although once primarily agricultural, it has experienced significant residential growth in recent decades, with a population of approximately 2,000 inhabitants. It has a primary school, a bank, the church of the Holy Name of Mary, an oratory, several sports facilities, and about ten public parks.

==== Pezzoli ====
The hamlet of Pezzoli is named after the eponymous cascina. The Pezzoli Cascina is home to an educational farm accredited by the region and province. The farm houses various animal species, including exotic ones.

==== Other localities in the territory ====
Balagia
A former locality in the heath north of Treviglio, a natural pasture bordering Arcene and Pontirolo Nuovo.

Blancanuda
An ancient settlement of farmhouses on the left bank of the Adda, near the current Cascina Cornella. Located in a particularly fertile area bordering Casirate d'Adda and Fara Gera d'Adda, it was only partially within Treviglio's territory. Much of the area is now part of Cassano d'Adda. The name, combining "bianca" (white) and "nuda" (bare), likely refers to a distinctive landscape feature. In 1509, the French army camped there the day before the Battle of Agnadello.

Brughera
A term designating lands between Pontirolo Nuovo, Fara Gera d'Adda, and Treviglio. Of ancient but unknown origin, these areas, once wooded, were transformed into fields while retaining their original appearance. In the Middle Ages, they were purchased by residents of Porta Zelute, later Zeduro, now Via Roma, from the municipality of Pontirolo Nuovo, and have since remained part of Treviglio.

Ferrandino
A small former hamlet of Treviglio, named after a rural property in the 17th century owned by Tommaso Ferrando, nicknamed "giumenteso." The nickname is preserved by a branch of the family.

Cascine Dotti, Giuseppana, Pelisa, and Santissimo
Each has a few dozen inhabitants. The name Pelisa means "fine meadow grass."

Gerundio
The name of the coastal and sub-coastal area centered on the state road to Milan, derived from the ancient Lake Gerundo.

Roccolo
A popular spot for Treviglio residents' outings, located southwest of the municipality in Via del Bosco. It is home to the eponymous park.

Valle del Lupo
A wild area north of Treviglio, in the final municipal section of the Vailata canal near Via Canonica at the height of Castel Cerreto. It features a stone bridge that historically connected Castel Cerreto and Fara Gera d'Adda. Roman artifacts have been found in the area. Until around 1830, it was inhabited by wolves.

== Economy ==
Economic activities have long been a strength of the city, which, as early as 1081, was called Trivillium Grassum in an imperial decree by Henry IV due to its prosperity. As a free commune, it was exempt from taxes until 1815, despite frequent raids by foreign armies imposing extraordinary levies.

Treviglio's economic model has evolved over time, particularly after World War II, transitioning from primarily agricultural and artisanal to industrial, and, since the 1990s, seeing growth in the tertiary sector. Key players in this process include Baslini and SAME.

=== Agriculture ===
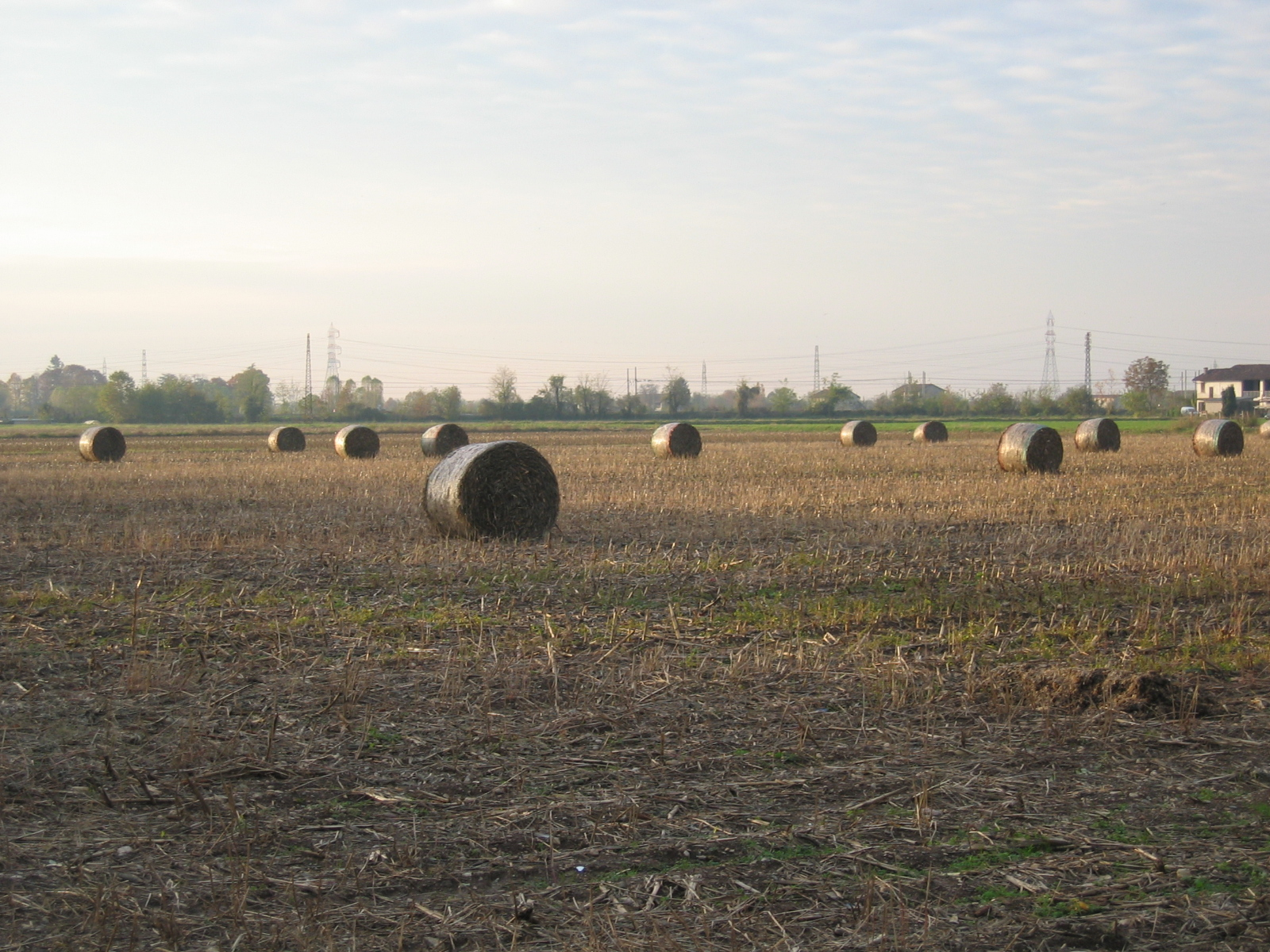
Autumn in the Treviglio countryside with hay bales

The soil of Treviglio was originally arid and gravelly, less suited for agriculture, but canalization of nearby rivers starting in the Middle Ages significantly improved conditions.

The Moschetta and Vignola canals were derived from the Brembo at Brembate, where the waterkeeper's house is located, while the Vailata canal was derived from the Adda at Fara Gera d'Adda. The first two flow north of the municipality, while the third runs through the western section of the municipal territory.

Little remains of the 200,000 mulberry trees that once fueled the city's textile industry, though some specimens remain in the Roccolo Park.

In the past, surface mines for gravel materials were active, including the Vailata quarry near the road to Casirate d'Adda.

=== Craftsmanship ===
Fine furniture is among the local craft products widespread in Treviglio and its surroundings. In the past, high-quality yarns were produced near the current Viale Filagno. Some of these yarns depict scenes of the Adda crossing at Cassano and are preserved in the treasury of Monza Cathedral.

=== Industry ===
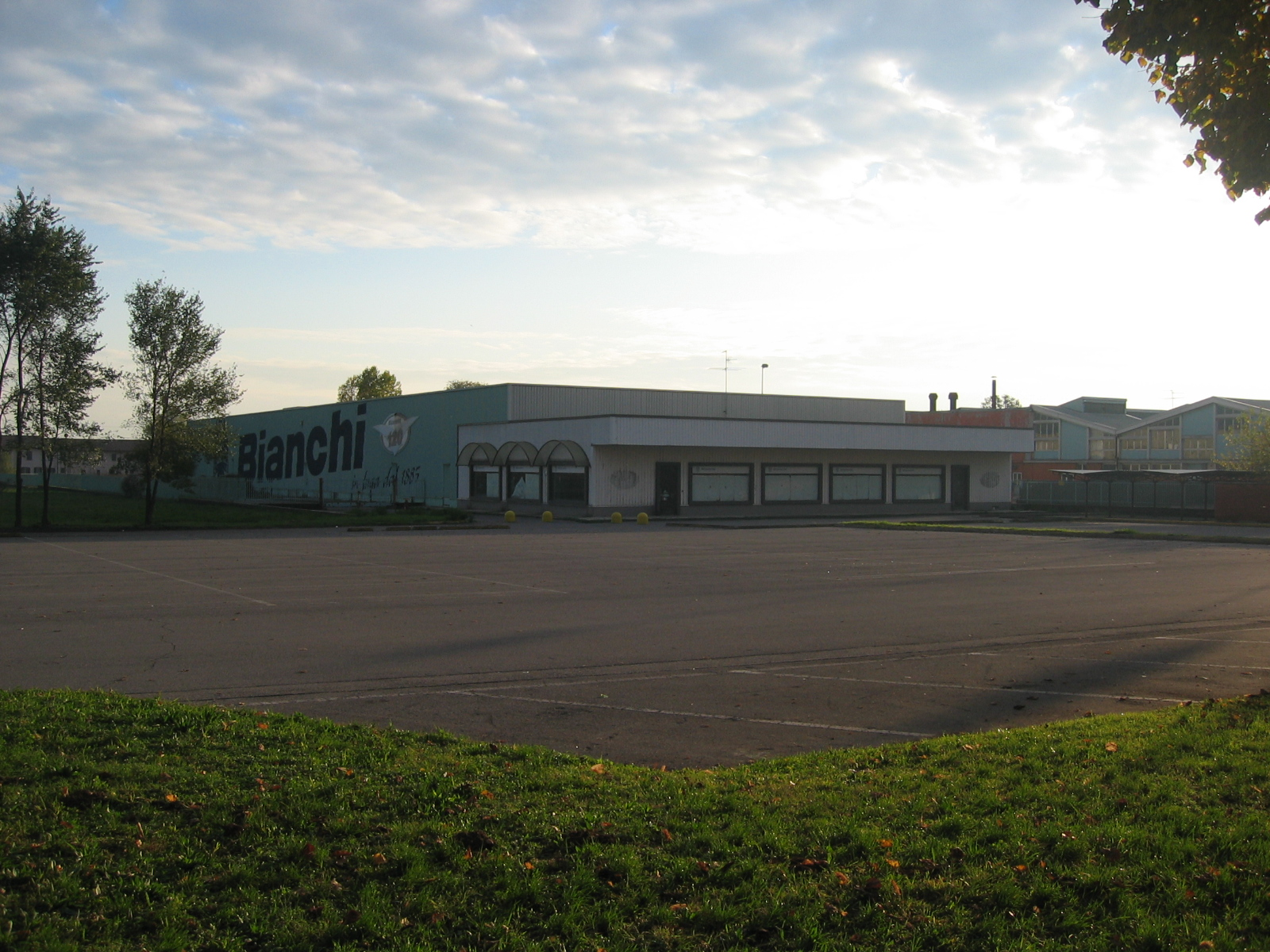
Bianchi bicycle factory

Treviglio is home to numerous industries that benefit from its excellent road and rail connections. The most prominent is the SAME Deutz-Fahr group, the world's fourth-largest tractor producer and the leading one in Europe (including the SAME, Lamborghini, Hürlimann, and Deutz-Fahr brands). This has earned Treviglio the nickname "the city of tractors".

The main headquarters of Bianchi, a bicycle manufacturer, is also located in the city.

Since 2006, the Eurogravure printing company, part of the Arvato group controlled by Bertelsmann, has been established in the PIP 1 zone.

A notable company from the past was Atlantic, known internationally for its toy production, particularly its toy soldiers.

==== PIP 1 Zone ====
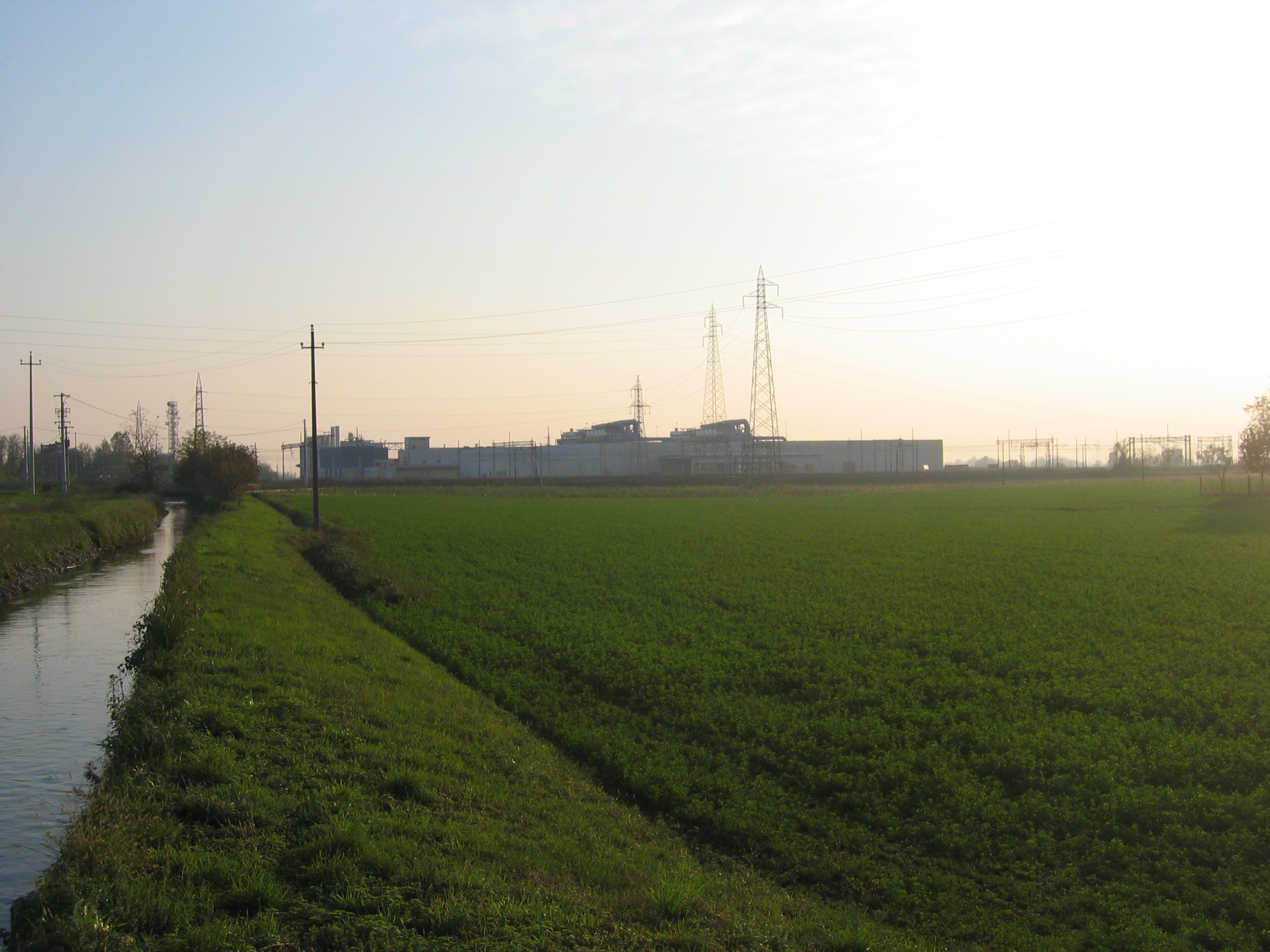
The Eurogravure printing company viewed from the surrounding countryside

The PIP 1 zone is Treviglio's oldest industrial area, located in the southwestern part of the municipal territory, south of the Milan-Venice railway and southwest of the central station. It is home to numerous companies, including the Eurogravure printing company.

==== PIP 2 Zone ====
Treviglio's most recent industrial area is the PIP 2 zone, which is home to numerous commercial and artisanal businesses, as well as the city's main landfill. It is located south of the Milan-Venice railway near the branch heading toward Cremona.

=== Services ===
The tertiary sector has also become well-established in the municipal territory. It is home to numerous insurance companies and banks. The Cassa Rurale e Artigiana, the main bank of the Gera d'Adda, has its headquarters there.

The Treviglio Commerce District Association oversees most of the city's retail sector.

=== Tourism ===
With a basilica, an imposing bell tower, the Sanctuary of the Madonna delle Lacrime, and various museums, Treviglio has a strong tourism potential, though it is less visited for religious purposes compared to nearby Caravaggio, known worldwide for its sanctuary.

Although tourist flows are present, they are limited and mostly linked to twinning arrangements and local events, such as the Feast of the Miracle and its historical parade.

== Transport ==
=== Roads ===
South of the city lies the A35-BreBeMi motorway, with the Treviglio toll booth located in the western part of the city. The city is crossed by the Strada statale 11 Padana Superiore, connecting Turin to Venice, which was the main east-west axis of Northern Italy until the 1960s. Several provincial and state roads originate in Treviglio, including the Strada statale 42 del Tonale e della Mendola, linking the center to Bergamo, Strada Provinciale 128, Strada Provinciale 129, Strada Provinciale 136, Strada Provinciale 141, Strada Provinciale 142, and the Strada statale 472 Bergamina, connecting the municipality to Lodi.

=== Railways ===
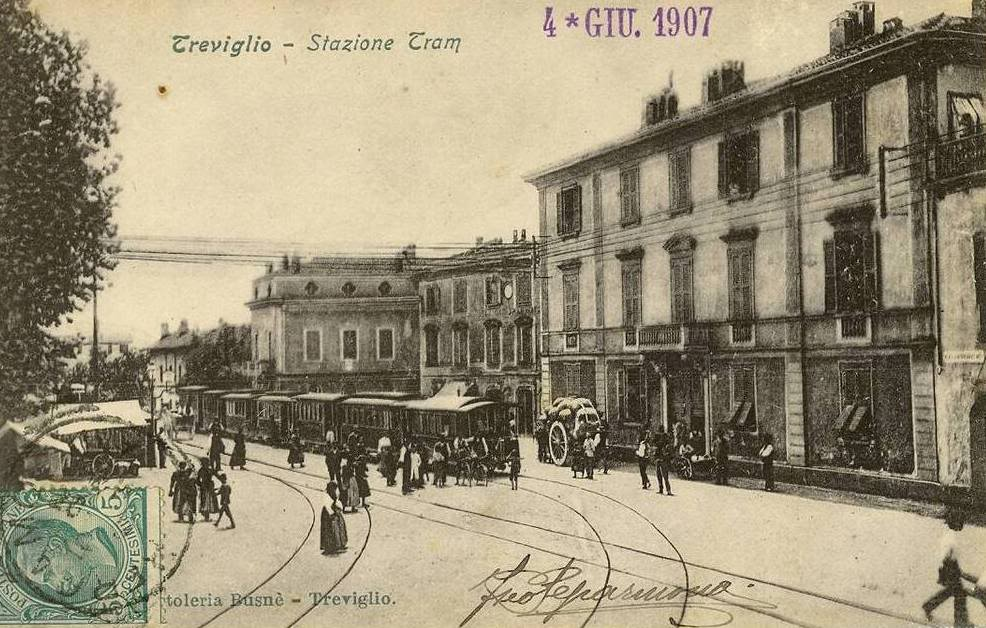
The tramway station

Treviglio has two railway facilities: the Treviglio railway station, located on the important Milan-Venice railway and serving as a junction for the lines to Bergamo and Cremona, and the Treviglio Ovest railway station, on the Bergamo line. Since 13 December 2009, Treviglio station has served as the eastern terminus of lines S5 and S6 of the Milan suburban railway service.

In the past, the city was also served by the Fornaci-Treviglio-Caravaggio tramway and the Lodi-Treviglio-Bergamo tramway.

=== Public transport ===
The city is served by urban and suburban bus lines operated by SAI, founded in Treviglio in 1920, with eight lines.

== Government ==
=== Directly elected mayors (1993–) ===
Mayor		Term		Party	Coalition
Mayor		Start	End	Party	Coalition
1	Luigi Minuti	20 June 1993	27 April 1997	Italian Socialist Party; Democratic Party of the Left	PDS–PSI–PSDI–PRI
1	Luigi Minuti	27 April 1997	13 May 2001	Italian Socialist Party; Democratic Party of the Left	The Olive Tree (PDS–PRC–Civic lists)
2	Giorgio Zordan	13 May 2001	12 June 2006	Independent (Note: In the subsequent 2006 elections, supported by the centre-right.)	The Olive Tree (DS–PRC–IdV–Civic lists)
3	Ariella Borghi	12 June 2006	13 June 2011	Democrats of the Left; Democratic Party	The Union (DS–PRC–FdV–IdV–Civic lists)
4	Giuseppe Pezzoni	13 June 2011	22 December 2015 (Note: Resigned on 25 November, with the decision becoming irrevocable on 22 December. From that date, the mayor was replaced by an interim administrator until the 2016 administrative elections.)	The People of Freedom (Note: Independent from 2014 when Forza Italia moved to the opposition.)	PdL (Note: Until 2014.)–LN–Civic lists
-	Alfredo Nappi	23 December 2015	29 January 2016	Interim Administrator	Interim administration
-	Alfredo Nappi	29 January 2016	20 June 2016	Extraordinary Commissioner	Interim administration
5	Juri Fabio Imeri	20 June 2016	5 October 2021	Lega	LN–FdI–Civic lists
5	Juri Fabio Imeri	5 October 2021	Incumbent	Lega	Lega–FdI–FI–UdC–Civic lists

== Sports ==
In football, the main club is Trevigliese, which competes in Serie D and has previously participated in several Serie C championships and earlier lower-tier tournaments.

In basketball, the main local team is Treviglio Brianza Basket, competing in the Serie B championship.

Also noteworthy is Atletica Estrada, which has won numerous national and international trophies and medals with its athletes.

=== Cycling ===
Giro d'Italia

Treviglio hosted the so-called "Grande Partenza" of the Giro d'Italia in the 1967 edition, with the official start taking place on June 20 from the Edoardo Bianchi factory toward Alessandria, where the first stage concluded with a victory by Giorgio Zancanaro. In total, the city has been a stage location for the "Corsa Rosa" on two occasions (one start and one finish).

Cycling clubs

The Ciclistica Trevigliese is also significant, having hosted the national team time trial event in Treviglio for the third year in 2019.

=== Sports facilities ===
Among the city's sports facilities are:

- PalaFacchetti Sports Hall
- Alessandra Quadri Municipal Swimming Pool
- "Ambrogio Mazza" Sports Fields
- "Mario Zanconti" Sports Fields
- "City of Treviglio" Athletics Track
- Tennis courts

Additionally, seven public school gyms in the city are available:

- A. Mozzi School Gym
- C. Battisti School Gym
- E. De Amicis School Gym
- Geromina School Gym
- Gatti School Gym
- ISIS Zenale e Butinone Gym
- T. Grossi School Gym

== Notable people ==
- Bernardino Butinone, painter
- Bernardo Zenale, painter and architect
- Giovan Battista Dell'Era, painter
- Andrea Verga, neurologist
- Pier Luigi Della Torre, surgeon
- Piero Mentasti, politician
- Ildebrando Santagiuliana, writer and historian
- Tullio Santagiuliana, writer and historian
- Trento Longaretti, painter
- Ermanno Olmi, film director
- Luigi Ornaghi, actor and farmer
- Orlando Rozzoni, former footballer
- Giuseppe Merisi, Catholic bishop
- Giacinto Facchetti, former footballer
- Vittorio Carioli, former footballer
- Domenico Casati, former footballer
- Battista Mombrini, engraver, sculptor and painter
- Valeria Fedeli, politician
- Edoardo Ronchi, former Minister of Agriculture
- Roberto Corti, former footballer
- Claudio Vertova, former footballer
- Giuseppe Erba, former footballer
- Cesare Bornaghi, former Olympic shooter
- Simone Albergoni, motorcycle racer
- Andrea Possenti, astrophysicist
- Alberto Rossini, basketball coach and former player
- Emanuele Merisi, former Olympic swimmer
- Alberto Belloni, physicist
- Enrico Zanoni, footballer
- [[]], footballer

== Twin towns and sister cities ==
- Lauingen, Germany
- Romsey, United Kingdom

== Bibliography ==
=== Essential Bibliography ===
- Carminati, Marco (1982). Il circondario di Treviglio e i suoi comuni. Cenni storici [The Treviglio District and Its Municipalities: Historical Notes]. Treviglio: Messaggi.
- Santagiuliana, Tullio; Santagiuliana, Ildebrando (1965). Storia di Treviglio [History of Treviglio]. Bergamo: Bolis.
- Perego, Piero; Santagiuliana, Ildebrando (1987). Storia di Treviglio [History of Treviglio]. Vol. 2 volumes. Treviglio: Pro Loco.
- Possenti, Amanzio; Magni, Giovanni; Perego, Piero (1997). Treviglio: alla riscoperta di un territorio [Treviglio: Rediscovering a Territory]. Roma: ECRA.
- Oggionni, Barbara (2002). Treviglio, storia, arte, cultura [Treviglio: History, Art, Culture]. Reggiolo: Clessidra.

=== Detailed Bibliography ===
- Cantù, Ignazio (1860). Bergamo e il suo territorio [Bergamo and Its Territory]. Bergamo.
- Lodi, Emanuele (1647). Breve storia delle cose memorabili di Trevì [Brief History of the Memorable Events of Treviglio]. Milano: C.P. Ramellati.
- Santagiuliana, Tullio (1982). Briciole di storia di Gera d'Adda antica [Fragments of the History of Ancient Gera d'Adda]. Calvenzano: Grafiche Signorelli.
- Autori vari. Cartina della Città di Treviglio [Map of the City of Treviglio]. Treviglio: edizioni Tipolito CFV.
- Colmuto Zanella, Graziella; Conti, Flavio (2004). "La Gera d'Adda". Castra Bergomensia [Bergamo Castles]. Bergamo: provincia di Bergamo.
- Autori vari (1999). Istituto Professionale Zenale e Butinone (ed.). Conoscere la Gera d'Adda [Discovering Gera d'Adda]. Ranica: Fumagalli.
- Autori vari (2003). Assessorato alla cultura della città di Treviglio-Museo Civico Ernesto e Teresa Della Torre (ed.). Dietro le quinte de l'albero degli zoccoli [Behind the Scenes of The Tree of Wooden Clogs]. Calvenzano: Leonardo Facco.
- de Pascale, Enrico; Olivari, Mariolina (1994). Dizionario degli artisti di Caravaggio e Treviglio [Dictionary of Artists of Caravaggio and Treviglio]. Bergamo: Bolis.
- Gasca Queirazza, Giuliano (2006). Dizionario di toponomastica. Storia e significato dei nomi geografici italiani [Dictionary of Toponymy: History and Meaning of Italian Geographical Names]. Milano: Garzanti. ISBN 9788811305002.
- Francia, Carmelo; Gambarini, Emanuele (2001). Dizionario italiano-bergamasco [Italian-Bergamasque Dictionary]. Torre Boldone: Grafital. ISBN 978-88-87353-12-9.
- Mochi, Alberto; Santagiuliana, Tullio (1973). Gera d'Adda [Gera d'Adda]. Roma: ECRA.
- Cantù, Cesare (1859). Grande illustrazione del Lombardo-Veneto [Great Illustration of Lombardo-Veneto]. Milano.
- Cassani, Luigi; Mandelli, E.; Santagiuliana, Tullio (1981). Il braccio di Treviglio [The Treviglio Arm]. Roma: ECRA.
- Carminati, Marco (1892). Il circondario di Treviglio e i suoi comuni [The Treviglio District and Its Municipalities]. Treviglio.
- Furia, Paolo (1979). Il lascito Della Torre [The Della Torre Bequest]. Calvenzano: Grafiche Signorelli.
- Furia, Paolo (1982). Il mio Santuario [My Sanctuary]. Calvenzano: Grafiche Signorelli.
- Oggionni, Barbara; Oggionni, Giuseppe (1991). Le mura di Treviglio [The Walls of Treviglio]. Calvenzano: Grafiche Signorelli.
- Oggionni, Barbara (2000). Le rogge Moschetta e Vignola [The Moschetta and Vignola Canals]. Treviglio.
- Chiari, Giovanni (1982). Le rogge Trevigliesi [The Treviglio Canals]. Roma: ECRA.
- Autori vari (1996). Le Terre del lago Gerundo [The Lands of Lake Gerundo]. Roma: ECRA.
- Oggionni, Barbara (2003). "The Fortified Villages in Gera d'Adda: The Treviglio-Caravaggio-Brignano Triangle". Territorio e fortificazioni. Confini e difese della Gera d'Adda [Territory and Fortifications: Borders and Defenses of Gera d'Adda]. Bergamo.
- Casati, Carlo (1872). Treviglio di Ghiara d'Adda e suo territorio, memorie storiche-statistiche [Treviglio of Ghiara d'Adda and Its Territory: Historical-Statistical Memories]. Milano: Perseveranza.
- Merletti, Angelo; Carminati, Marco; Oggionni, Barbara (2006). Treviglio è terra e gente [Treviglio Is Land and People]. Bergamo: Grafica e arte.
- Sanudo, Marin (1880). Rinaldo Fulin (ed.). Diarii [Diaries]. Vol. 3. p. 1388.
