= Calvenzano =

- Comune
- Comune di Calvenzano
- Church of Saint Peter and Paul

- Coat of arms

- Location within Italy Location within Lombardy
- Coordinates: 45°30′N 9°36′E
- Country: Italy
- Region: Lombardy
- Province: Province of Bergamo (BG)

Government
  - Mayor: Fabio Ferla (Independent)

Area
  - Total: 6.5 km^{2} (2.5 sq mi)
- Elevation: 114 m (374 ft)

Population (Dec. 2004)
  - Total: 3,618
  - Density: 560/km^{2} (1,400/sq mi)
- Demonym: Calvenzanesi
- Time zone: UTC+1 (CET)
  - Summer (DST): UTC+2 (CEST)
- Postal code: 24040
- Dialing code: 0363
- ISTAT code: 016047

Calvenzano (Bergamasque: Colvensà or Carvensà) is a comune (municipality) in the Province of Bergamo in the Italian region of Lombardy, located about 35 kilometres (22 mi) east of Milan and about 25 kilometres (16 mi) south of Bergamo. As of 31 December 2004, it had a population of 3,618 and an area of 6.5 square kilometres (2.5 mi^{2}).

Calvenzano borders the following municipalities: Arzago d'Adda, Caravaggio, Casirate d'Adda, Misano di Gera d'Adda, Treviglio, Vailate.

== Demographic evolution ==
Historical population

Year	Pop.	±%
1861	1,676	—
1871	1,686	+0.6%
1881	1,698	+0.7%
1901	1,875	+10.4%
1911	2,061	+9.9%

Year	Pop.	±%
1921	2,161	+4.9%
1931	2,190	+1.3%
1936	2,187	−0.1%
1951	2,341	+7.0%
1961	2,288	−2.3%

Year	Pop.	±%
1971	2,320	+1.4%
1981	2,686	+15.8%
1991	3,030	+12.8%
2001	3,447	+13.8%

Source: Data from ISTAT
