= Misano =

Misano may refer to several places in Italy:

- Misano Adriatico, a town in the Province of Rimini, Emilia-Romagna
  - Misano World Circuit Marco Simoncelli, an Italian motor racing track located next to the town of Misano Adriatico
- Misano di Gera d'Adda, a municipality in the Province of Bergamo, Lombardy
- Misano Olona, a civil parish of Bornasco, in the Province of Pavia, Lombardy
