= Arzago d'Adda =

- Comune
- Comune di Arzago d'Adda
- Parish Church, Arzago d'Adda

- Flag Coat of arms

- Location of Arzago d'Adda in Italy Arzago d'Adda (Lombardy)
- Coordinates: 45°29′N 9°34′E
- Country: Italy
- Region: Lombardy
- Province: Bergamo (BG)

Government
  - Mayor: Gabriele Riva

Area
  - Total: 9.31 km^{2} (3.59 sq mi)
- Elevation: 106 m (348 ft)

Population (28 February 2022)
  - Total: 2,719
  - Density: 292/km^{2} (756/sq mi)
- Demonym: Arzaghesi
- Time zone: UTC+1 (CET)
  - Summer (DST): UTC+2 (CEST)
- Postal code: 24040
- Dialing code: 0363
- Website: Official website

Arzago d'Adda (Bergamasque: Arsàc) is a comune (municipality) in the Province of Bergamo in the Italian region of Lombardy, located about 30 kilometres (19 mi) east of Milan and about 25 kilometres (16 mi) southwest of Bergamo.

Arzago d'Adda borders the following municipalities: Agnadello, Calvenzano, Casirate d'Adda, Rivolta d'Adda, Vailate. Sights include remains of a Roman villa from the imperial age, the castle of the marquises de Capitani d'Arzago (turned into a noble residence in the 16th-17th century), the manor Ravajola of the noble family de Sessa and the medieval pieve.
