= Enrico Zanoni =

Italian footballer (born 1999)

Personal information
- Date of birth: 23 August 1999 (age 27)
- Place of birth: Treviglio, Italy
- Height: 1.84 m (6 ft 0 in)
- Position: Defender

Team information
- Current team: Portici

Youth career
- –2018: Atalanta

Senior career*
Years	Team	Apps	(Gls)
2018–2022	Atalanta	0	(0)
2018–2019	→ Modena (loan)	26	(0)
2019–2020	→ Gubbio (loan)	13	(1)
2020–2021	→ Ravenna (loan)	18	(0)
2021–2022	→ Turris (loan)	7	(0)
2022–2023	Sarrabus Ogliastra	28	(1)
2023–	Portici	16	(0)
- * Club domestic league appearances and goals as of 20 December 2023

Enrico Zanoni (born 23 August 1999) is an Italian football player who plays for Serie D club Portici.

== Club career ==
He is a product of Atalanta youth teams. For the 2018–19, he was loaned to Serie D club Modena, helping them achieve promotion to Serie C.

On 5 July 2019, he joined Serie C club Gubbio on loan. He made his professional Serie C debut for Gubbio on 6 October 2019 in a game against Reggiana. He started the game and scored his first professional goal in the 38th minute.

On 3 September 2020 he moved on loan to Ravenna.

On 13 July 2021 he was loaned to Turris.
