= Giovan Battista Dell'Era =

Italian painter

Giovan Battista Dell'Era (1765–1798) was an Italian painter.

He was born in Treviglio. He was the son of a brazier, but his predilection for art induced him to go to Bergamo and become a pupil of Francesco Dagiù, called Capella. In 1785 he went to Rome, and there befriended Angelica Kauffman, with whom he painted several pictures. For the Empress Catharine of Russia, he copied seven of the best masterpieces in the galleries of Rome. He painted the theater curtain (sipario) for the Theater at Arezzo. He died at Florence in 1798. His best work is the Esther before Ahasuerus for the basilica of San Martino in Alzano Maggiore, near Bergamo. His son Raffaele who was also training as an artist died in Florence at 33 years of age.
