= Fara Gera d'Adda =

- Comune
- Comune di Fara Gera d'Adda
- Location within Italy Location within Lombardy
- Coordinates: 45°33′N 9°32′E
- Country: Italy
- Region: Lombardy
- Province: Bergamo (BG)

Government
  - Mayor: Raffaele Assanelli

Area
  - Total: 10.79 km^{2} (4.17 sq mi)
- Elevation: 131 m (430 ft)

Population (28 February 2022)
  - Total: 7,959
  - Density: 737.6/km^{2} (1,910/sq mi)
- Demonym: Faresi
- Time zone: UTC+1 (CET)
  - Summer (DST): UTC+2 (CEST)
- Postal code: 24045
- Dialing code: 0363
- Website: Official website

Fara Gera d'Adda is a comune (municipality) in the Province of Bergamo in the Italian region of Lombardy, located about 30 kilometres (19 mi) northeast of Milan and about 20 kilometres (12 mi) southwest of Bergamo.

Fara Gera d'Adda borders the following municipalities: Canonica d'Adda, Cassano d'Adda, Pontirolo Nuovo, Treviglio, Vaprio d'Adda.
