= Vailate =

Vailate Aliàt (Lombard)
- Comune
- Comune di Vailate
- Location within Italy Location within Lombardy
- Coordinates: 45°28′N 9°36′E
- Country: Italy
- Region: Lombardy
- Province: Province of Cremona (CR)

Area
  - Total: 9.8 km^{2} (3.8 sq mi)

Population (Dec. 2004)
  - Total: 4,299
  - Density: 440/km^{2} (1,100/sq mi)
- Time zone: UTC+1 (CET)
  - Summer (DST): UTC+2 (CEST)
- Postal code: 26019
- Dialing code: +390363
- Website: Official website

Vailate (Cremasco: Aliàt) is a comune (municipality) in the Province of Cremona in the Italian region Lombardy, located about 35 kilometres (22 mi) east of Milan and about 50 kilometres (31 mi) northwest of Cremona. As of 31 December 2004, it had a population of 4,299 and an area of 9.8 square kilometres (3.8 mi^{2}).

Vailate borders the following municipalities: Agnadello, Arzago d'Adda, Calvenzano, Capralba, Misano di Gera d'Adda, Torlino Vimercati.

== Demographic evolution ==
Historical population

Year	Pop.	±%
1861	2,631	—
1871	2,850	+8.3%
1881	2,773	−2.7%
1901	3,306	+19.2%
1911	3,445	+4.2%

Year	Pop.	±%
1921	3,390	−1.6%
1931	3,407	+0.5%
1936	2,988	−12.3%
1951	3,173	+6.2%
1961	3,050	−3.9%

Year	Pop.	±%
1971	3,131	+2.7%
1981	3,217	+2.7%
1991	3,489	+8.5%
2001	3,973	+13.9%

Source: Data from ISTAT
