= Misano di Gera d'Adda =

- Comune
- Comune di Misano di Gera d'Adda
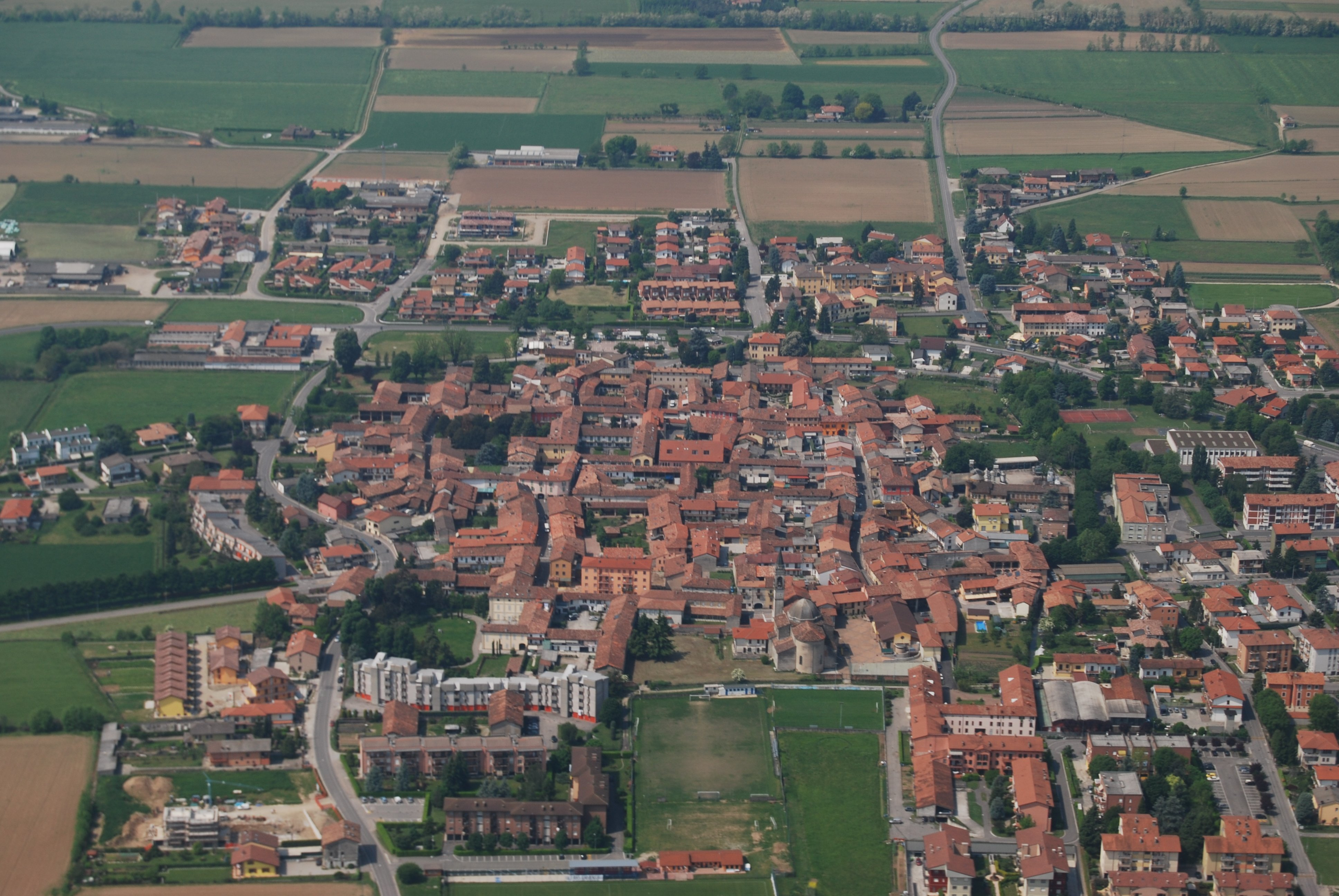
- Misano di Gera d'Adda

- Location within Italy Location within Lombardy
- Coordinates: 45°28′N 9°37′E
- Country: Italy
- Region: Lombardy
- Province: Province of Bergamo (BG)

Area
  - Total: 6.1 km^{2} (2.4 sq mi)
- Elevation: 104 m (341 ft)

Population (Dec. 2004)
  - Total: 2,877
  - Density: 470/km^{2} (1,200/sq mi)
- Demonym: Misanesi
- Time zone: UTC+1 (CET)
  - Summer (DST): UTC+2 (CEST)
- Postal code: 24040
- Dialing code: 0363

Misano di Gera d'Adda (Bergamasque: Misà) is a comune (municipality) in the Province of Bergamo in the Italian region of Lombardy, located about 35 kilometres (22 mi) east of Milan and about 25 kilometres (16 mi) south of Bergamo. As of 31 December 2004, it had a population of 2,877 and an area of 6.1 square kilometres (2.4 mi^{2}).

Misano di Gera d'Adda borders the following municipalities: Calvenzano, Capralba, Caravaggio, Vailate.

== Demographic evolution ==
Historical population

Year	Pop.	±%
1861	1,032	—
1871	1,118	+8.3%
1881	1,117	−0.1%
1901	1,252	+12.1%
1911	1,451	+15.9%

Year	Pop.	±%
1921	1,471	+1.4%
1931	1,548	+5.2%
1936	1,490	−3.7%
1951	1,591	+6.8%
1961	1,578	−0.8%

Year	Pop.	±%
1971	1,665	+5.5%
1981	1,985	+19.2%
1991	2,203	+11.0%
2001	2,590	+17.6%

Source: Data from ISTAT
