= Casirate d'Adda =

- Comune
- Comune di Casirate d'Adda
- Parish Church

- Coat of arms

- Location within Italy Location within Lombardy
- Coordinates: 45°30′N 9°34′E
- Country: Italy
- Region: Lombardy
- Province: Bergamo (BG)
- Frazioni: Cascine San Pietro

Government
  - Mayor: Manuel Calvi

Area
  - Total: 10.17 km^{2} (3.93 sq mi)
- Elevation: 114 m (374 ft)

Population (28 February 2022)
  - Total: 4,093
  - Density: 402.5/km^{2} (1,042/sq mi)
- Demonym: Casiratesi
- Time zone: UTC+1 (CET)
  - Summer (DST): UTC+2 (CEST)
- Postal code: 24040
- Dialing code: 0363
- Website: Official website

Casirate d'Adda (locally Casirà) is a comune (municipality) in the Province of Bergamo in the Italian region of Lombardy, located about 30 kilometres (19 mi) east of Milan and about 25 kilometres (16 mi) southwest of Bergamo.
