= Karas (surname) =

Karas is a surname with multiple origins (from Slavic countries and Greece). In Slavic languages, it refers to crucian carp and related cyprinids. Notable people with the surname include:

- Anton Karas (1906–1985), Austrian zither player and composer
- Archie Karas (born 1950), Greek gambler
- Beth Karas (born 1957), American attorney and TV commentator
- Danylo Karas (born 1997), Ukrainian footballer
- Jan Karaś (born 1959), Polish footballer
- Jay Karas, American film and television director and producer
- Joe Karas, American politician
- Josef Karas (born 1978), Czech decathlete
- Joža Karas (1926–2008), Polish-born Czech-American musician
- Kamil Karaš (born 1991), Slovak footballer
- Kenneth M. Karas (born 1964), American judge
- Marios Karas (born 1974), Cypriot football defender
- Michael Karas (born 1952), German physical chemist
- Mieczysław Karaś (1924–1977), Polish linguist
- Monika Karas (born 1960s), Hungarian journalist
- Othmar Karas (born 1957), Austrian politician
- Tomáš Karas (born 1975), Czech rower
- Viliam Karas (born 1976), Slovak lawyer
- Vjekoslav Karas (1821–1858), Croatian painter
- Vladimír Karas (1927–2003), Czech gymnast
- Witold Karaś (born 1951), Polish footballer
- Władysław Karaś (1893–1942), Polish sport shooter

== See also ==
- Karasik
- Karasyov
