= Peter Agricola =

German scholar and diplomat (1525–1585)

- Born: 29 June 1525; Holzheim (bei Neu-Ulm), Baden-Württemberg, Germany
- Died: 5 or 7 July 1585 (aged 60); Randersacker,
- Occupations: Renaissance humanist, educator, classical scholar and theologian, diplomat and statesman, disciple of Martin Luther, friend and collaborator of Philipp Melanchthon
- Spouse: Diana Clelius (m. 1575; died 1581)
- Children: 0

Peter Agricola (June 29, 1525 – July 5 or 7, 1585) was a German Renaissance humanist, educator, classical scholar and theologian, diplomat and statesman, disciple of Martin Luther, friend and collaborator of Philipp Melanchthon.

Successively tutor to several young princes of German sovereign states and rector of schools in Ulm and Lauingen, where he created (1559–1561) and developed the Gymnasium Illustre, he became an important councilor and State minister of the Dukes of Zweibrücken and Palatinate-Neuburg, carrying out many missions in the German Holy Roman Empire and supporting the Protestant Reformation.

== Early life ==
Peter Agricola was born in Holzheim (bei Neu-Ulm) in present-day Baden-Württemberg, a son of Magnus Agricola (Steinheim (Neu-Ulm), ca. 1470 – Holzheim, 1531) and Apollonia Fabricius (Tiefenbach (Neu-Ulm), ? – Holzheim, 1590) and spent his childhood in the area of Ulm.

He was 7 when he lost his father, an innkeeper and judge at Holzheim, and former student at Ingolstadt (Bavaria) who had been a resident in Rome at a Benedictine cardinal's (Jean Bilhères de Lagraulas), planning to join the Benedictine Abbey of Elchingen, but who however - because of the disorders of Rome, nepotism of Pope Alexander VI and war-oriented behavior of future Pope Julius II - enlisted in the imperial troops which were taking part in King Charles VIII of France's war in Italy, during the military operations in the peninsula (1494/95-1497), before he eventually returned to Germany, where he later on showed interest in Martin Luther’s work.

Peter Agricola's mother was a woman of great piety who also showed interest in the Reformation. She made him attend weekly sermons in Ulm and registered him at Ulm high school. As Peter Agricola showed great potential he served as tutor to the children of a rich merchant of the city, who tried to get him hired on a permanent basis in his business, even offering his mother 1,000 ducats to get her to agree, but neither Peter Agricola nor his mother wanted to switch from studies for trade.

One of his brothers, Georg Agricola, also went to be soldier in Italy, where he took part to several dangerous military actions, being present at fall of the city of Rome (1527).

== Studies ==
After having received a classical education, becoming proficient in both Latin and Greek, Peter Agricola, then aged 18, left Ulm in 1543 and went to Heidelberg University. He stayed there during one year: registered on March 12, 1543 (as Peter Agricola, von Holzheim), Peter Agricola graduated with a Bachelor of Arts (Bacc.) on June 18, 1544.

He then enlisted at the prestigious and famous Lutheran university of Wittenberg, where he registered (as Petrus Agricola Ulmensis) at the end of September 1544 and on October 9, 1548, and had Martin Luther as professor and mentor. He earned there a master (Magister) on May 3, 1549, and wanted to become a church minister.

Because of the military disorders however, and following the death of Luther, Peter Agricola left Wittenberg to return in Ulm where he became a teacher (at the end of 1546) before joining Wittenberg university again, achieving his philosophy course there.

== Career ==
Frederick III, reigning duke of Liegnitz in Silesia (now Legnica in Poland), had requested the reformer Philipp Melanchthon to provide him with a tutor for his oldest son, Henry XI of Legnica, then his only son, aged 12. Melanchthon strongly advised with his friend Peter Agricola to accept this position.

Peter Agricola arrived at Liegnitz on April 19, 1550 and was introduced the following day at the castle where he started his new duties. Duke Frederick having served in France in 1551, against the will of Charles V, Holy Roman Emperor, he was stripped of his principality and the young prince Henry, duke of Liegnitz under the regency of his paternal uncle and curator, George II the Pious, duke of Brieg (now Brzeg in Poland), went to reside at Brieg. Peter Agricola followed him there and spent eight years in very good conditions. The prince having become a teenager, he went to the court of Emperor Ferdinand I of the Holy Empire, and his master was thanked with a valuable reward.

At the beginning of 1558, Peter Agricola was offered by the Senate of the city of Ulm the position of headmaster of the city Latin school and in spite of his choice to become a church minister he from now on pursued a secular career, stopping planning to become a Lutheran clergyman anymore. He took part in the school reformation project under Ludwig Rabus and in 1559 went to Augsburg where the imperial court then was, to advise Duke Henry XI, his former student (then wine waiter of Ferdinand I and in a difficult situation towards the Emperor). Peter Agricola declined thereafter a new offer to work again for this prince, though the imperial adviser Warnsdorf strongly advised him to do so, and also refused an offer from Hieronymus Wolf to be employed at St. Anne Latin school (Gymnasium bei St. Anna) of Augsburg, as he had been called by Wolfgang of Wittelsbach, duke in Bavaria and reigning Count Palatine of Zweibrücken and Neuburg, to found a school at Lauingen (Bavaria), a challenge he accepted due to the insistence of his close friend and former mate of Wittenberg university, the lawyer and reformer Ulrich Sitzinger, then princely adviser (privy council) and chancellor of the principalities of Palatine Zweibrücken and Palatinate-Neuburg.

He lived there in literary leisure, his charges being paid by the prince, and reformed the schools of the Palatinate of Neuburg. He moreover was named in 1561 tutor to the young princes and future rulers Philip Louis, Count Palatine of Neuburg and John I, Count Palatine of Zweibrücken. He eventually went at war in Hungary under Maximilian II of the Holy Empire with the elder of them (1566). As a reward, Duke Wolfgang gave to him an expensive present, made him Lord of a fee (fief) and Peter Agricola became a member of the prince's Privy Council (1569). In addition, the tutors to the others sons of the reigning duke were placed under his rule. The duke also testified his recognition to Peter Agricola by recommending him in his will, the year preceding his death (1568), as he was so much satisfied of his duties.

Privy Councillor and personal adviser, Peter Agricola became the State minister to the duke's successor, archi-Lutheran Count Palatine (Pfalzgraf) Philip Louis of Neuburg, a position of considerable responsibility. The benefits and favors which he enjoyed at the Court went by increasing and he earned a reputation as an honest and effective public servant. He persuaded the new prince to acquire the Wolfius library for their college.

He undertook diplomatic missions in the Holy Roman Empire and became increasingly influential in the government, welcoming foreigners, drafting official documents, and serving as a liaison between the Duke and other principalities. His position allowed him to defend Lutheran theologians he remained in connection with, and constantly provided them with pieces of advice and the financial help he was able to get for them from several sovereign princes due to his respected reputation.

All throughout his life, Peter Agricola had been in touch with historian and Lutheran theologian David Chytraeus, a friend and former mate at Wittenberg university.

In 1582, Louis VI, Elector Palatine offered him the position of tutor to his son Friedrich IV of the Electorate of the Palatinate (future Elector Palatine), then aged 8, but Peter Agricola preferred to decline by wisdom, because of his already advanced age.

Similarly, the deans of Strasbourg first university (founded by educator Johann Sturm, whom he had welcomed at Lauingen in December 1564) had unsuccessfully negotiated with him, in the hope that he would become one of their academics.

In 1575, Agricola married Diana Clelius († November 24, 1581, aged 47), a daughter to a consul of Lauingen and widow to a privy councillor of Otto-Henry, Elector Palatine, Duke in Bavaria and Count Palatine of Neuburg. She also was the widow of the famous Bohemian mathematician, astrologer and astronomer Cyprián Karásek Lvovický (Cyprianus Leovitius), professor at the Court of Neuburg and one head master of the Gymnasium Illustre. The Sovereigns organized for this occasion a wedding party, which party the Duke and Duchess attended in person, and on this occasion they gave as gift to Peter Agricola and his wife a large grace and favour house.

== Death ==
Though he had planned to go to a spa resort in 1585, Peter Agricola was requested by Duke Philip Louis to instead come with him to Düsseldorf at the wedding of the prince's step-brother John William, Duke of Jülich-Cleves-Berg with Jakoba of Baden (daughter to Philibert, Margrave of Baden) during the month of June. He died (apoplexy) in his carriage during the journey back, on the way between Schweinfurt and Ansbach, near the village of Reinsacker (Randersacker) in the vicinity of Würzburg, the last stop. His body was brought to Ochsenfurt and put in a coffin before being buried the next day at Uffenheim (Bavaria) - as it was not possible to bring it back to Neuburg, too far away - in the presence of the duke. Many writings published following his death praised him.

Childless, he was the uncle to Lutheran prelate and theologian Magnus Agricola, his legatee and spiritual successor.
