= Karasyov =

Karasyov, Karasev (Russian: Карасёв), feminine: Karasyova or Karaseva. is a Russian-language patronymic surname derived from the nickname Karas, "Carassius". Belarusian: Карасёў, romanized: Karasyow, Ukrainian: Карасьов, romanized: Karasyov. Notable people with the surname include:

- Aleksandr or Alexander Karasyov, multiple persons
- Andrei Karasyov (born 1993), Russian association football player
- Andrey Karasyow (born 1991), Belarusian association football player
- Dmitri Karasyov (born 1992), Russian association football player
- Felix Karasev, Russian KGB General and diplomat
- Nikolay Karasyov (shot putter) (born 1939), Russian Olympic shot putter
- Nikolay Karasyov (rower) (born 1927), Russian Olympic rower
- Pavel Karasyov (born 1992), Russian association football player
- Sergei Karasev (born 1979), Russian association football referee
- Sergey Karasev (born 1993), Russian basketball player
- Valery Karasyov (born 1946), Russian gymnast
- Vasily Karasev (born 1971), Russian basketball player
- Marina Karaseva (born 1958), Russian musicologist
- Olga Karasyova (1949–2025), Russian gymnast
