= Karásek =

Karásek (feminine Karásková) is a Czech surname. The Polish variant is Karasek. Notable people include:

- Cyprián Karásek Lvovický, Czech astronomer
- David Karasek (born 1987), Swiss swimmer
- Franz Karasek (1924–1986), Austrian politician
- Hellmuth Karasek (1934–2015), German novelist, journalist and literary critic
- Jiří Karásek ze Lvovic, Czech poet
- Krzysztof Karasek, Polish poet, essayist and literary critic

== See also ==
- Karasik
