= Deutz-Fahr =

German agricultural equipment manufacturer

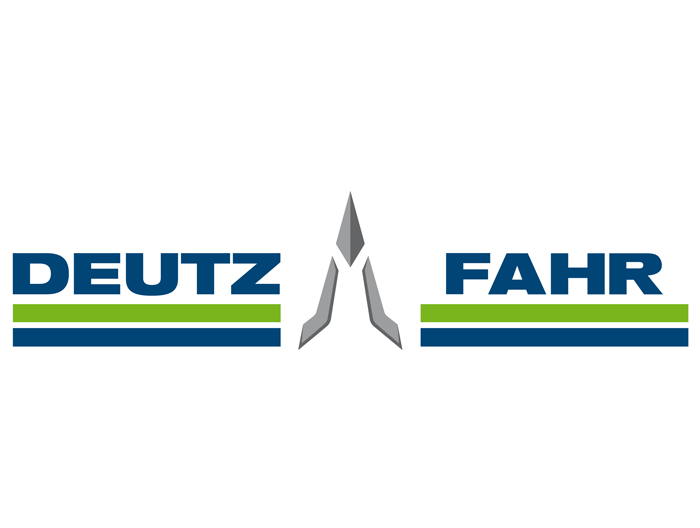
- Type: GmbH
- Industry: Agricultural machinery
- Founded: 1864
- Headquarters: Lauingen, Bavaria, Germany
- Area served: Worldwide
- Products: Tractors; Combine harvesters Smart Farming Technology
- Parent: SDF Group
- Website: www.deutz-fahr.com

Deutz-Fahr is a German brand of agricultural machinery and tractors. The brand originated from the agricultural division of Klöckner-Humboldt-Deutz AG (KHD), the tractor manufacturer Fahr, and the threshing machine producer Ködel & Böhm. Since 1995, Deutz-Fahr has been part of the Italian company SDF (formerly SAME Deutz-Fahr).

Tractors of the Agrotron 6.4 Series, 6 Series, 7 Series, 8 Series, and 9 Series are manufactured at the plant in Lauingen, which was inaugurated in 2017 under the name Deutz-Fahr Land, for distribution worldwide.

== History ==
=== Early History of Deutz ===
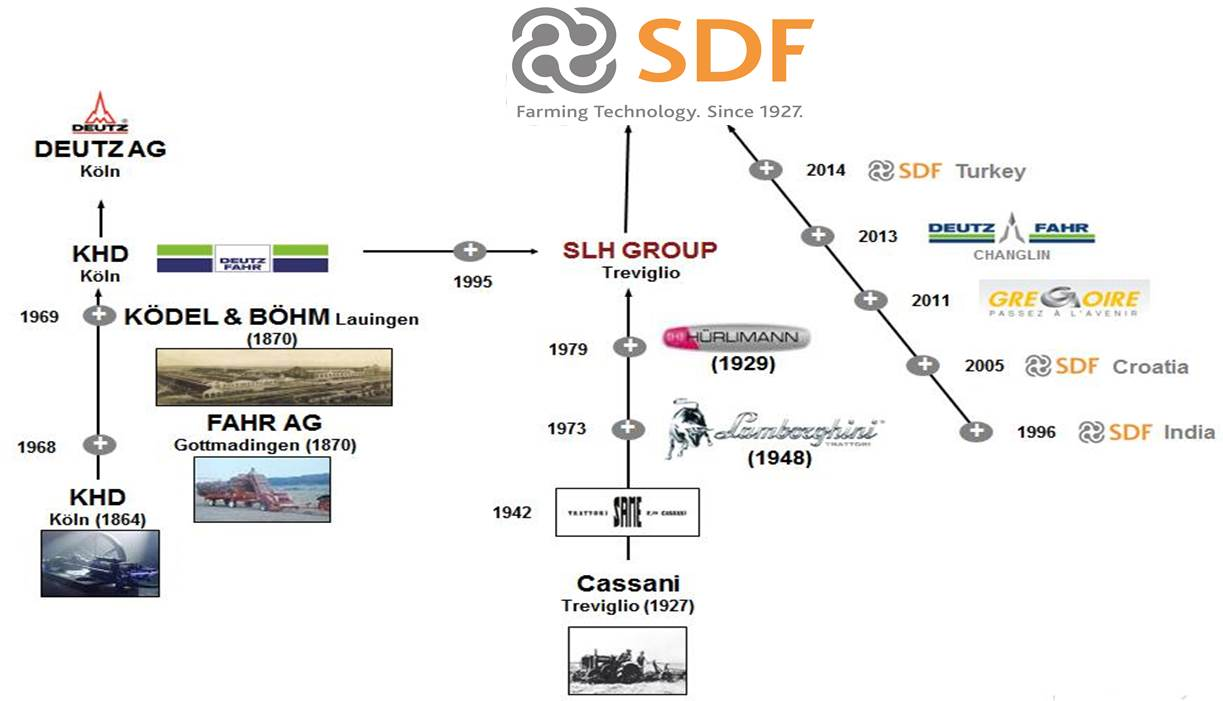

The origins of Deutz-Fahr date to 1864, when Nikolaus August Otto and Eugen Langen founded the world’s first engine factory in Cologne. Operating under the name Gasmotoren-Fabrik Deutz AG, the company rapidly developed and employed renowned engineers such as Gottlieb Daimler and Wilhelm Maybach. Initially focused on stationary engines, the company later expanded into mobile propulsion technologies.

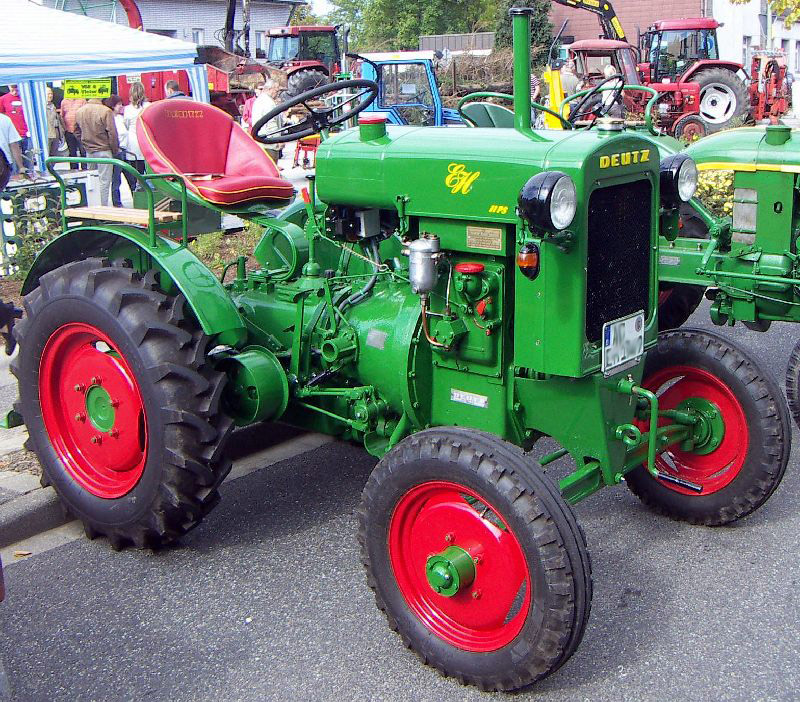
Deutz Elfer (F1M 414/46) with 11 HP.

An early attempt at building a tractor came in 1919 with the “Deutzer Trekker.” The real breakthrough occurred in the 1930s with the F2M 315 and the successful F1M 414 (nicknamed “Elfer-Deutz”), of which over 12,000 units were produced.

During the Second World War, Deutz shifted to manufacturing wood gas-powered tractors. Reconstruction began in 1946, followed by the launch of the robust air-cooled FL 514 in 1950. From 1957, the D series introduced modern design and more powerful engines.

The 05 series, introduced in the mid-1960s, set new standards in modularity and drive technology. In 1970, the acquisition of Fahr led to the formation of the Deutz-Fahr brand. Models such as the DX series and the INTRAC system demonstrated the company’s commitment to innovation.

=== Early History of FAHR ===
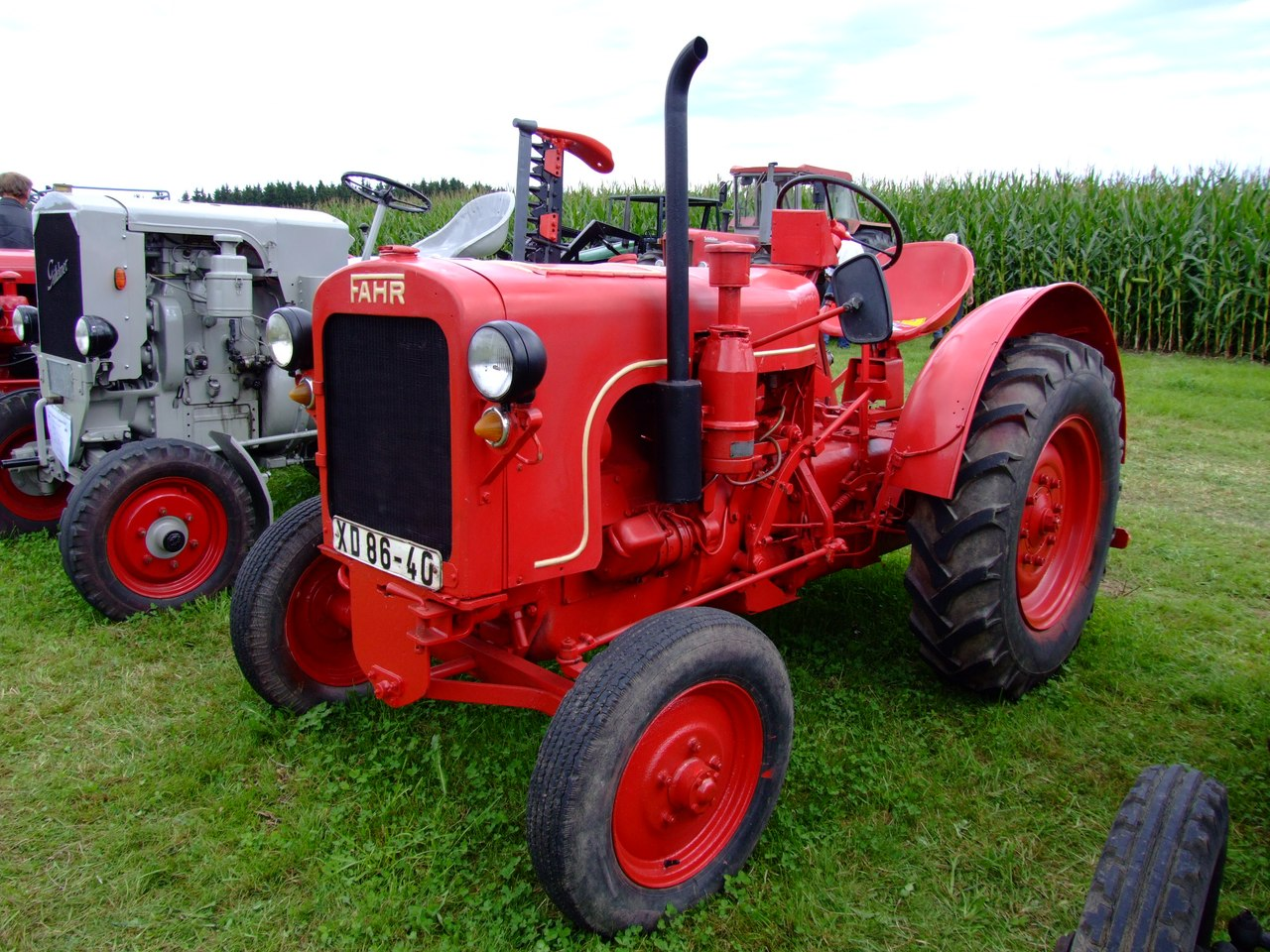
Fahr F22

The Fahr machine factory was founded in 1870 by Johann Georg Fahr in Gottmadingen. One of the company's most notable products was the self-binder, produced in 1911. The first tractor, the Fahr F22, was built in 1938 based on a concept by Wilfred Fahr and Bernhard Flerlage. It featured a 22 hp (16 kW) Deutz F2M414 two-cylinder diesel engine.

This model was further developed into the Fahr T22 in 1940, followed by the wood gas-powered Fahr HG25 in 1942. After the end of the Second World War, the company adapted to changing market demands and expanded its product range. Key models of this period included the Fahr D30 W (1949), Fahr D15 (1949), Fahr D12N (1953), Fahr D17N (1953), Fahr D90 (1954), and Fahr D180H (1954).

In 1961, Klöckner-Humboldt-Deutz AG (KHD) initially acquired a 25% stake in Fahr. The complete takeover of operations and facilities was finalized in 1977.

=== SAME Acquisition and Developments since 1990 ===
Following an unsuccessful attempt to expand into the U.S. market, the Italian SAME Group acquired KHD’s agricultural machinery division in 1995. The Deutz-Fahr brand continued under the newly formed SDF Group, with the Lauingen site remaining operational. With series such as Agrotron and Agrotron TTV, Deutz-Fahr entered new performance segments. In 2017, a state-of-the-art tractor production facility was inaugurated in Lauingen. Under the name “Deutz-Fahr Land,” the site produces high-horsepower tractors of up to 336 hp.

== Tractors ==
=== Early Models ===
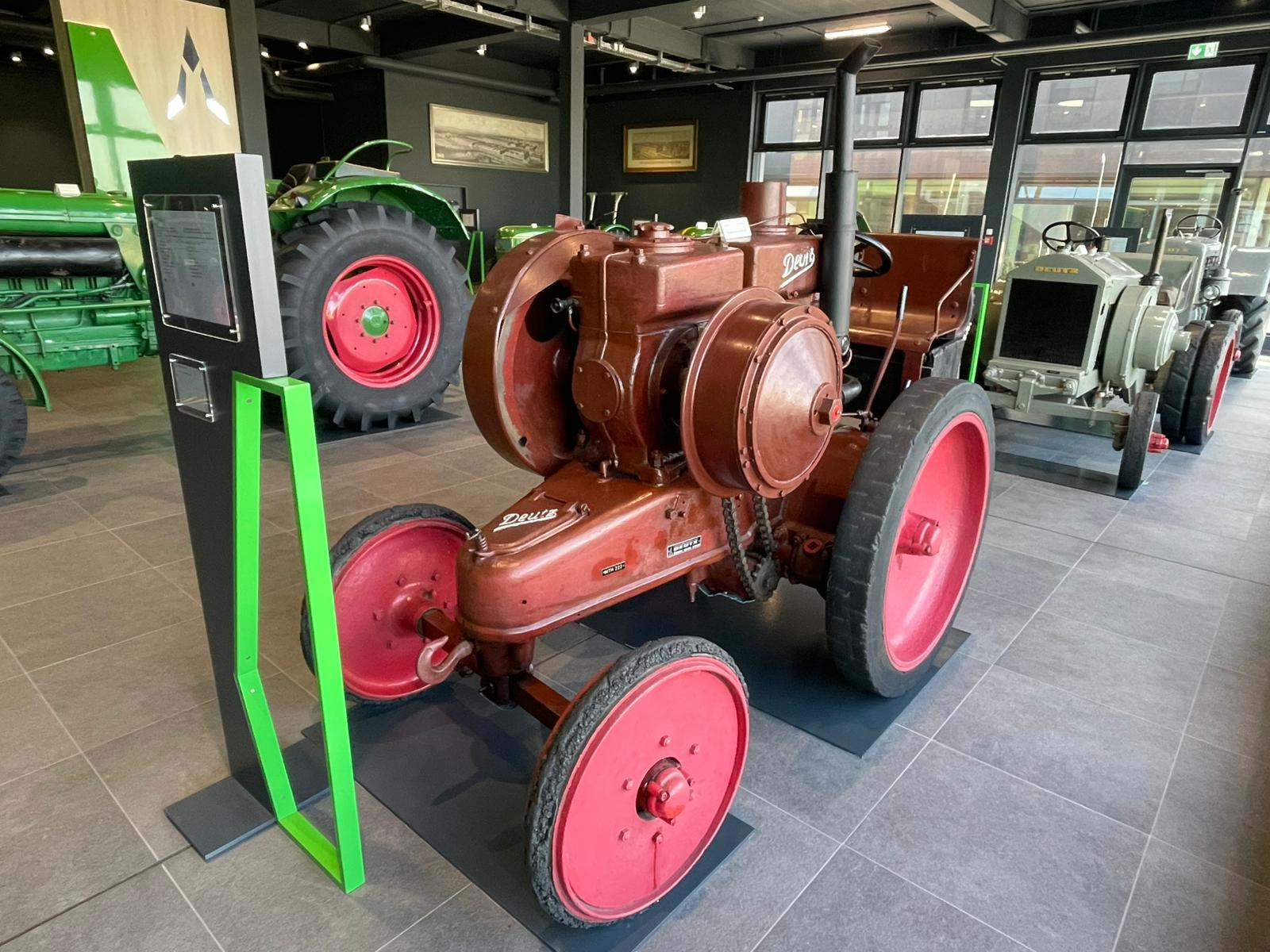
Deutz MTH 222, single-cylinder semi-diesel tractor exhibited at the Deutz-Fahr Museum.

As early as 1907, Deutz began testing its first traction engines, including a 25 hp motorized plough. In 1919, the “Deutzer Trekker,” a 40 hp artillery tractor, was developed, though it never achieved widespread commercial use. Series production of diesel tractors began in 1926 with the MTH models (e.g., MTH 222). These were followed in 1929 by the MTZ series, offering up to 36 hp and improved driving characteristics—around 2,000 units were produced.

The F2M and F3M series dominated the interwar period. The F2M 315 was a robust steel-wheeled tractor with 28 hp. For heavier applications, more powerful models like the F3M 317 (50 hp) and F2M 417 were introduced. Starting in 1936, the F1M 414—a compact and versatile single-cylinder tractor with 11–12 hp—became a highly successful model for small-scale farms. Nearly 19,000 units were produced by 1953. With the post-war FL 514, Deutz began the transition to air-cooled engine technology—an innovation that would define many subsequent series.

=== 514 Series and the Development of Deutz Engines ===
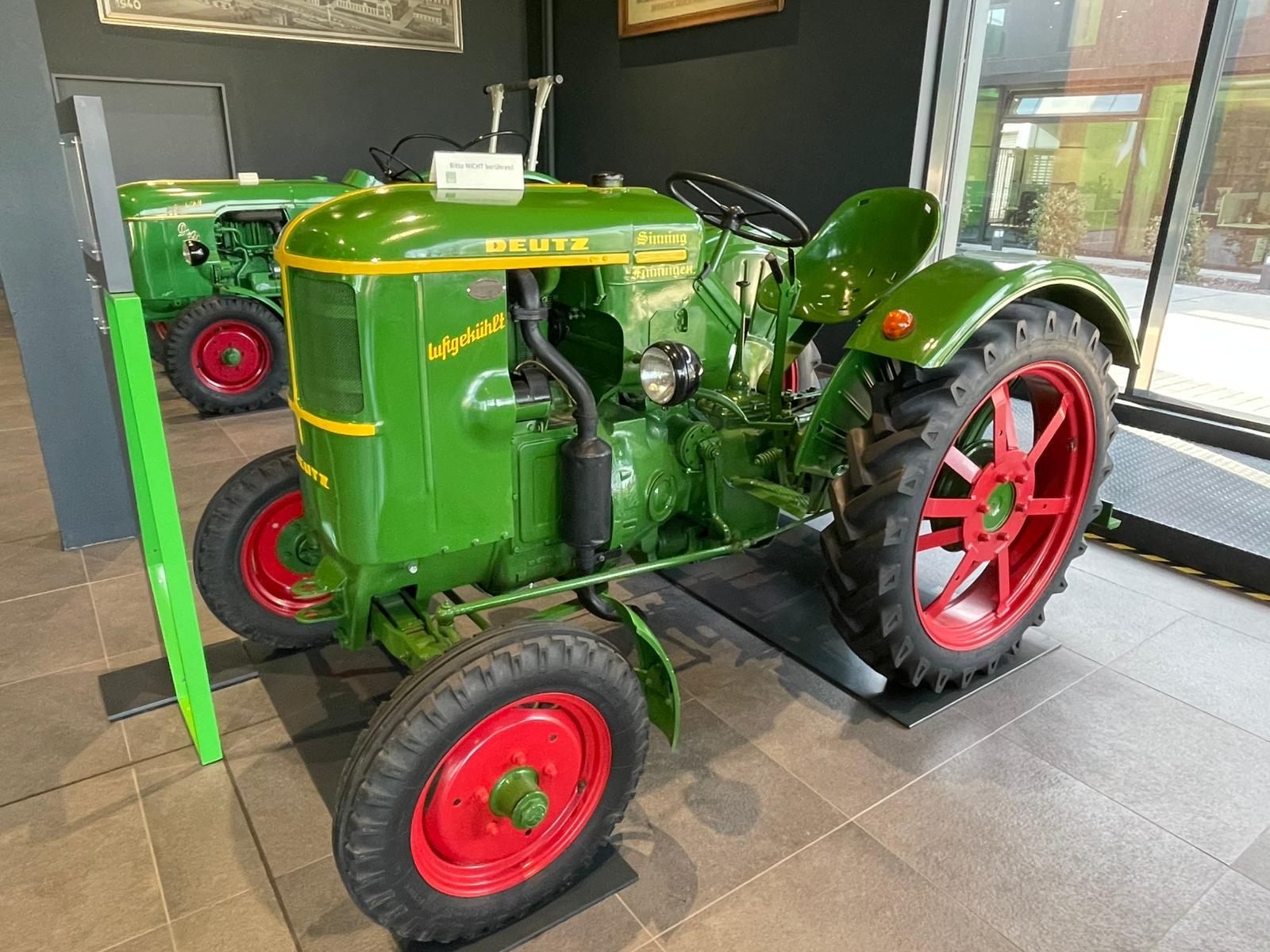
Deutz F1L 514 with air-cooled single-cylinder diesel engine.

Starting in the 1950s, Deutz was among the first manufacturers worldwide to equip tractors with air-cooled diesel engines as standard. This technology significantly reduced maintenance requirements and proved particularly effective in extreme climate conditions. Introduced in 1950, the F1L 514 with 15 hp became the best-selling model of the series, with around 37,000 units produced. It was followed by more powerful variants such as the F2L 514, initially offering 28 hp and later up to 50 hp. The series was continuously expanded to include various versions, including standard, high-clearance, and utility tractors. The three-cylinder F3L 514 reached a production volume of approximately 17,000 units and was also licensed for production abroad, including in Argentina.

In addition, Deutz developed compact models such as the F1L 612 and F2L 612 for smaller farms, as well as the F2L 712 from 1957, which featured improved engine characteristics. In parallel, Deutz also produced crawler tractors with outputs ranging from 60 to 90 hp, more than 15,000 of which were used primarily in agriculture and construction.

The development of Deutz engines began in 1926 with diesel engines based on prechamber combustion. A major advancement was the air-cooled FL 514, which utilized swirl chamber technology developed by Harry Ricardo. Later series such as the FL 712, FL 812, and FL 912 featured more compact designs and introduced direct fuel injection for the first time. From the 1990s onwards, the engine portfolio was supplemented by water-cooled units. Today, modern TTCD engines meeting Euro Tier 4 Final emission standards are used, combining high performance, efficiency, and reduced emissions.

=== The D Series ===
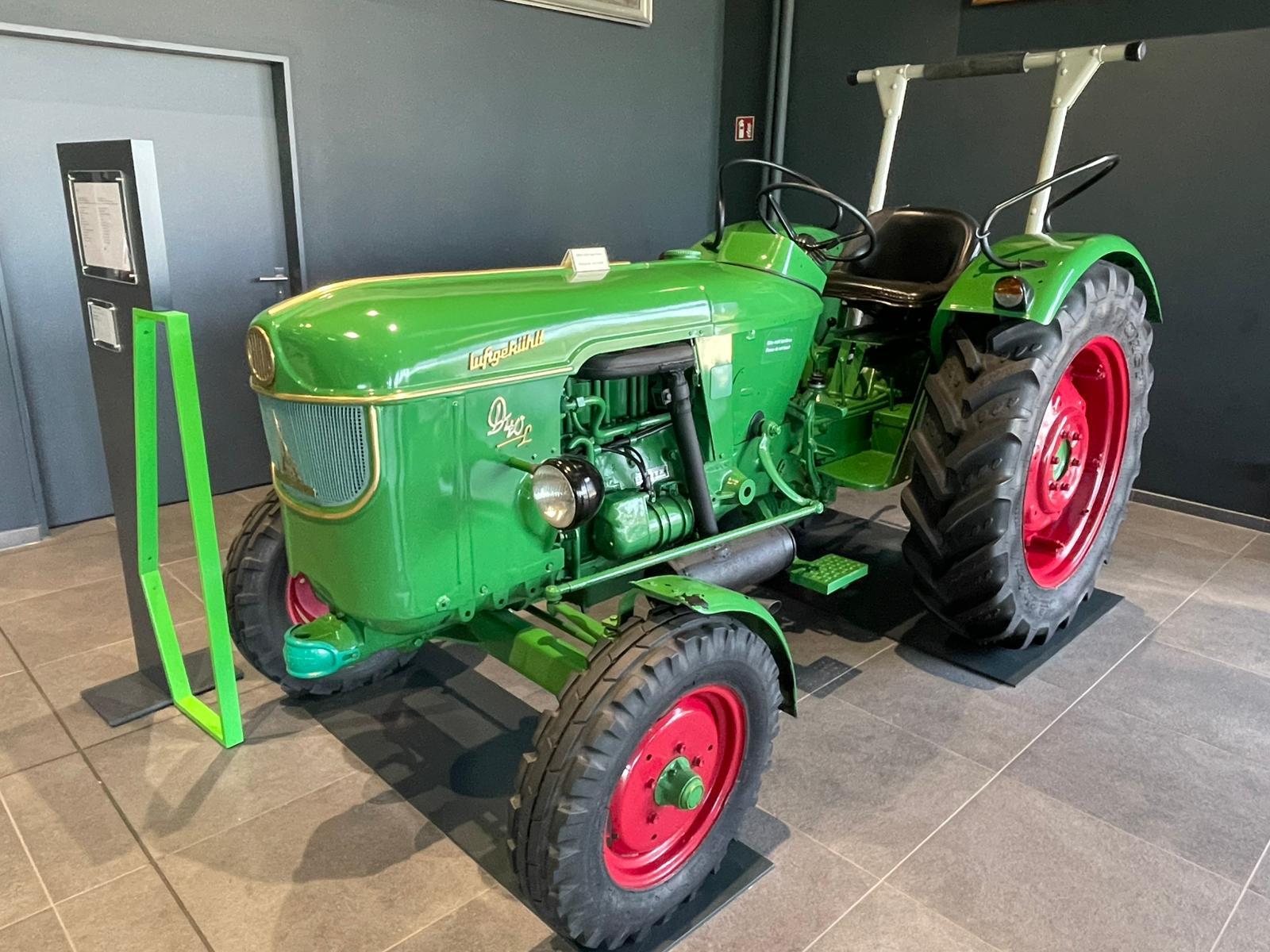
Deutz D 40.2 with air-cooled three-cylinder diesel engine.

The D series was introduced in 1957 with the launch of the D 40 model, marking a fundamental restructuring of the Deutz tractor lineup. Starting in 1959, all models were designated according to their horsepower output. The series covered a wide performance range, from simple single-cylinder tractors to powerful six-cylinder models.

The D 15, produced from 1964 to 1965, was the last single-cylinder model and was designed as an affordable standard tractor. More successful were the D 25 models, offering up to 25 hp, particularly the D 25.2 and the D 30—the latter becoming the best-selling Deutz tractor of its time. The three-cylinder D 40, with 35 to 38 hp, was a versatile machine available in numerous variants. For larger farms, the 46 hp D 50 was introduced in 1960 and, from 1964 onwards, equipped with the F4L-812 engine. In 1964, the D 80 became the first six-cylinder model in the series, delivering 75 hp; a 100 hp export version was produced in Argentina and marketed exclusively in South America.

The D series was the last Deutz line to feature a rounded engine hood and stood out for its modular design, wide range of variants, and technical innovations such as draft control hydraulics, Transfermatic systems, and dual-clutch configurations. Beginning in 1965, it was gradually replaced by the 05 series.

=== The 05 Series ===
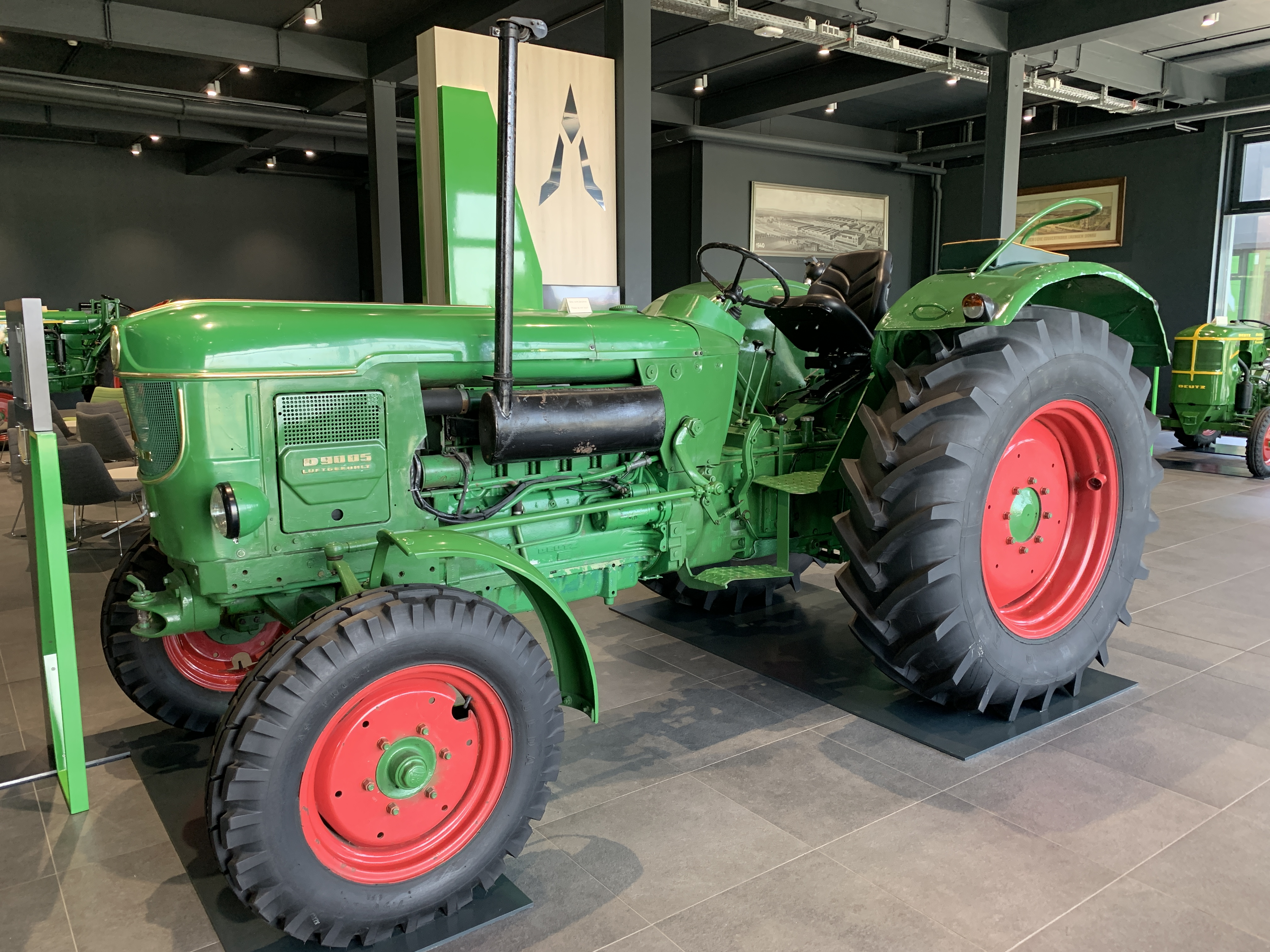
Deutz D 90 05 with air-cooled six-cylinder diesel engine.

With the introduction of the 05 series in the mid-1960s, Deutz initiated a comprehensive standardization of tractor production. Uniform radiator grilles, the new company logo featuring the stylized Ulm Minster—derived from the Magirus brand acquired in the 1930s—and the standard implementation of an axial fan led to improvements in design, maintenance, and noise comfort.

The D 25 05 (22 hp) and D 30 05 (28 hp) were the last two-cylinder models of this generation. Equipped with simple transmissions—some sourced from Porsche-Diesel production—they offered features such as hydraulic systems and dual-clutch options. Production was eventually discontinued as the market shifted towards more powerful machines. The mid-range segment was covered by the three-cylinder D 40 05 and D 45 05 (35 to 45 hp), as well as the four-cylinder D 50 05 and D 55 05 (45 to 55 hp). These models featured modern eight-speed transmissions and were available with options such as mower drive systems, front loaders, or special comfort paint finishes.

A notable variant was the D 55 05 Tandem, an experimental model with two engines and two front axles. With the introduction of the D 60 05 in 1966 (58 hp), a direct injection engine was used in Deutz series production for the first time. The six-cylinder models D 80 05 (75 hp) and its all-wheel-drive version D 80 05 A established themselves as high-performance tractors, offering hydrostatic steering and enhanced comfort features. In 1967, the short-lived D 90 05 with 85 hp became the most powerful model of the series.

The 05 series marked the transition from traditional to modern tractor concepts at Deutz. It introduced modular design, Transfermatic technology, and, for the first time, standard all-wheel drive—while simultaneously ending the era of rounded engine hoods.

=== The 06 Series ===
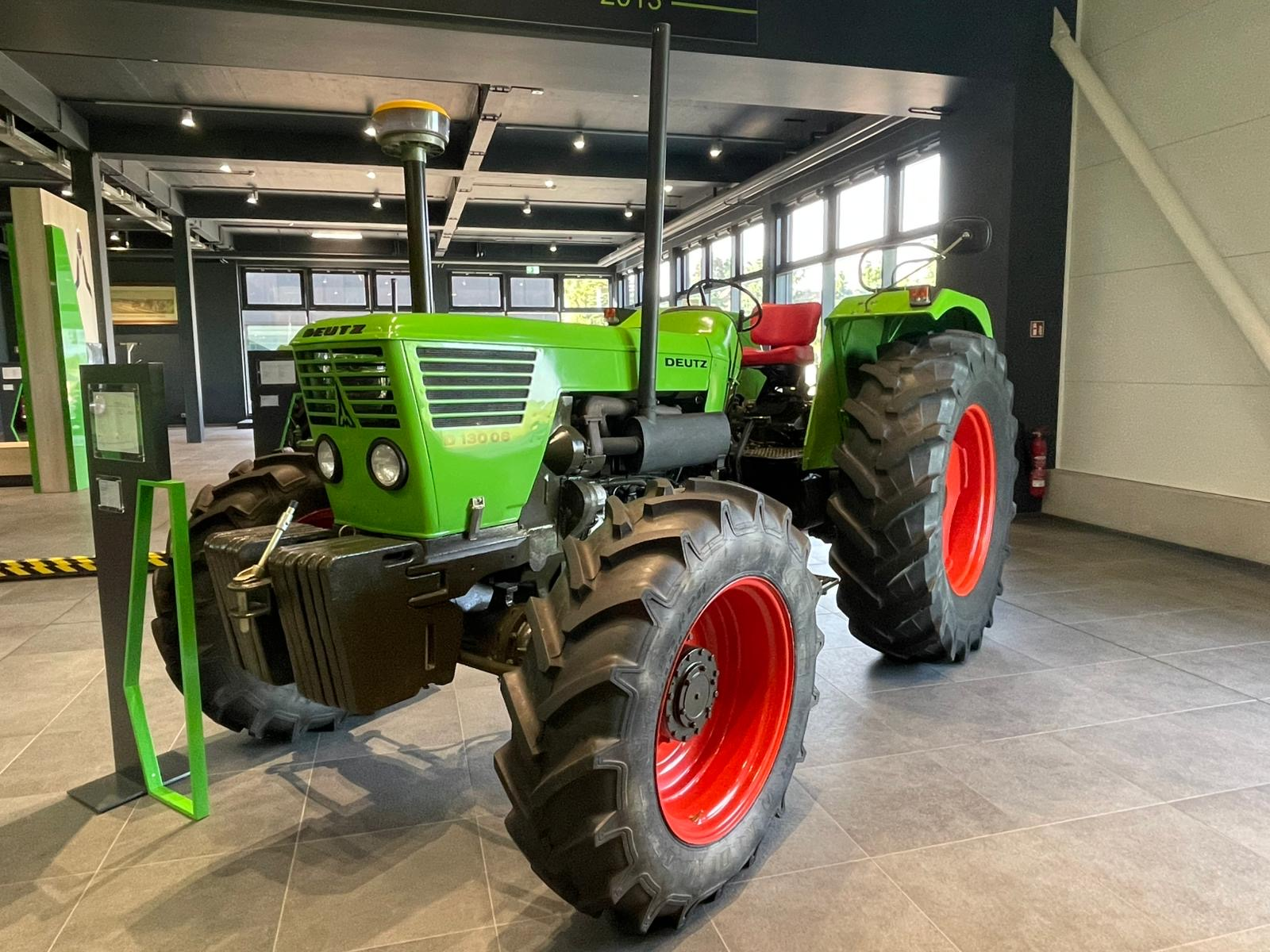
Deutz D 130 06 A with air-cooled inline six-cylinder engine and all-wheel drive.

Beginning in 1968, Deutz undertook a comprehensive modernization of its tractor lineup with the introduction of the 06 series. Unveiled at the DLG exhibition under the slogan “Premiere of New Power,” the series featured the new 912 engine generation with direct fuel injection. Distinctive design elements included angular engine hoods with integrated round headlights. Despite challenging market conditions, the 06 series became the most successful tractor range in the company’s history. The model portfolio covered a wide power spectrum from 22 to 130 hp: the two-cylinder D 25 06 and D 30 06 were designed for small farms, while the three-cylinder D 40 06 and D 45 06 gained widespread popularity as standard tractors. In the four-cylinder segment, the range extended from the D 50 06 to the D 130 06, the latter equipped with a turbocharger for use on large-scale farms. More powerful six-cylinder models such as the D 90 06 and D 90 05 further complemented the lineup. A special variant was the D 160 06, an articulated loader tractor produced only in limited numbers.

Starting in 1970, the series was upgraded with additional comfort and safety features, including improved three-point linkages, safety frames, and cabs with enhanced driver ergonomics. In 1974, Deutz introduced a new bright green color scheme and released modernized variants such as the D 52 06. In parallel with the main series, Deutz developed the INTRAC system—a novel tractor concept featuring three implement mounting areas (front, center, and rear), a cab positioned above the front axle, and quick-change attachment systems. The INTRAC 2002 to 2006 models delivered between 60 and 115 hp and, in some versions, featured hydrostatic drives. This concept was particularly suited for forestry and municipal operations.

For specialized crop cultivation, Deutz also introduced the AgroCompact series. These models were designed with compact dimensions and high maneuverability, offering practical solutions especially for viticulture and fruit growing.

=== Specialized Tractors ===
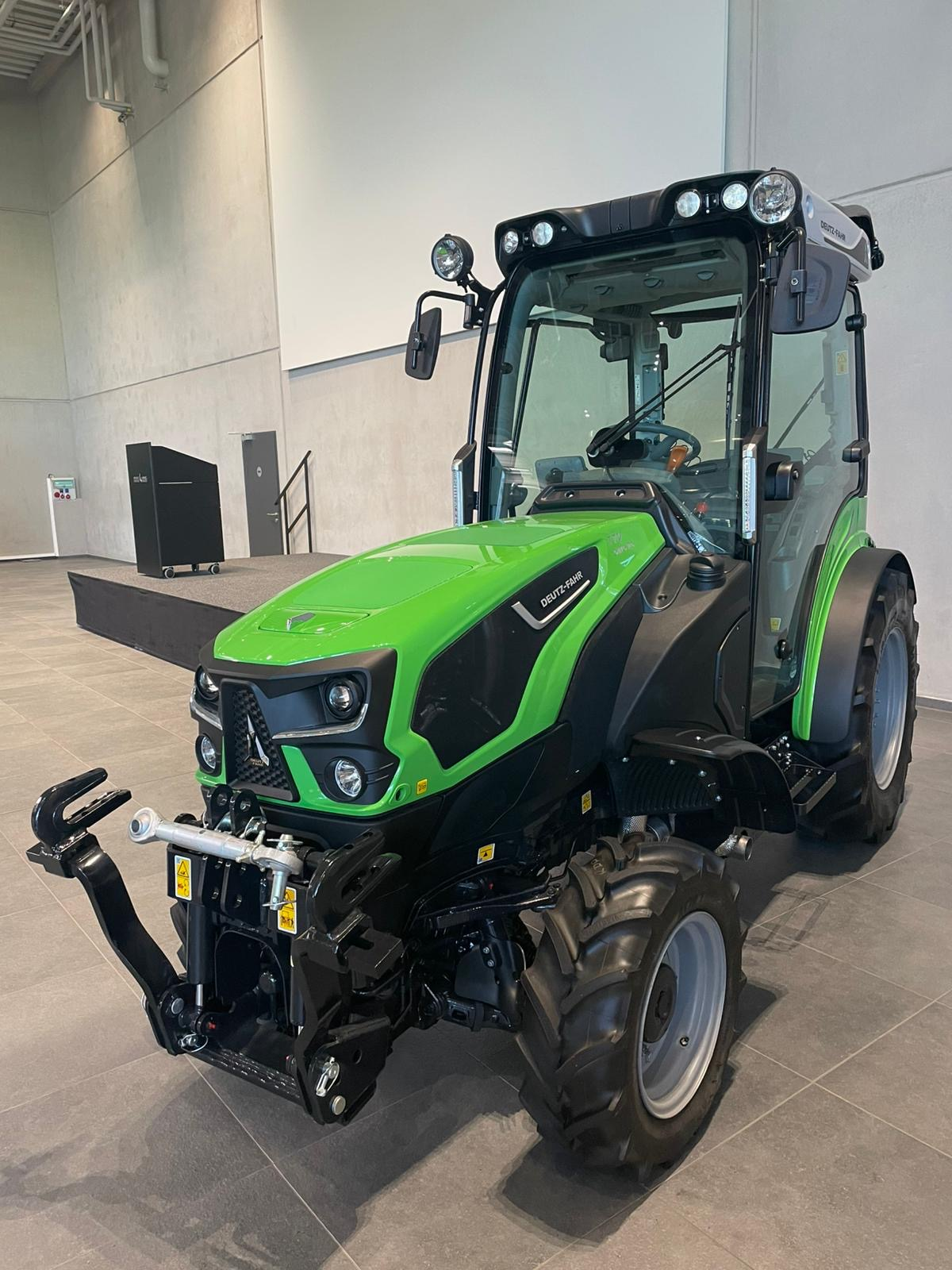
The Deutz-Fahr 5105 DS TTV is a compact tractor with a continuously variable transmission, designed for specialized crops and narrow working environments.

Deutz-Fahr has a long-standing tradition in the development of specialized narrow-gauge tractors designed primarily for fruit, vineyard, and hop cultivation. As early as the F1M 414—also known as the “Elfer”—a plantation version with a reduced track width was offered. In the 1950s and 1960s, narrow variants of popular models such as the F1L 514 and D 30 were also available. During the era of the DX series, Deutz-Fahr continued its focus on narrow-gauge tractors. Collaborations with the Italian manufacturer Agrifull and the French cab specialist Buisard expanded the company’s offerings in the municipal and specialty crop sectors.

In 1993, the AgroCompact series was introduced, adding maneuverable narrow-gauge tractors for specialty crop cultivation to the product range, with engines up to 88 hp. In 1996, the compact Agrokid series followed, offering 31 to 51 hp and aimed particularly at municipal services and horticulture. Also starting in 1996, the Agroplus series was launched, featuring models with a steering angle of up to 60 degrees for excellent maneuverability. Some versions, offering up to 106 hp, received multiple awards.

Since 2007, Deutz-Fahr has also offered the Agroclimber crawler tractor, designed for use on slopes and challenging terrain. In 2017, the 5D series was introduced as the successor to the Agroplus line. The models 5DF, 5DV, and 5DS, with outputs ranging from 75 to 113 hp, feature modern technology—including a suspended front axle with independent wheel suspension—and are particularly suited for work in difficult terrain.

=== The First DX Tractors ===
In 1978, Deutz-Fahr introduced the DX series as the successor to the technically outdated 06 series. With the initial models—DX 85, DX 90, DX 110, and the flagship DX 230—a new generation of tractors was launched, focusing on modern technology and enhanced operator comfort. The series featured an angular design with a newly styled engine hood and contrasting-colored rims. For the first time, sound-insulated comfort cabs were offered as standard, including the JuniorCab and MasterCab. Deutz also increasingly relied on in-house transmission development.

Between 1978 and 1982, the model range covered various power classes: DX 85, DX 90, and DX 110 targeted the mid-range segment with five- and six-cylinder engines. The DX 140 and DX 160, delivering between 125 and 150 hp, featured turbochargers and Steyr transmissions. From 1980, the lineup was expanded with the DX 120, DX 145, and the export-focused DX 230 with 200 hp. In 1982, new four-cylinder models—DX 80, DX 86, and DX 92—were introduced, along with the DX 250, a new top-of-the-line model offering 220 hp and equipped with a ZF transmission.

The launch of the DX series marked a significant generational shift at Deutz-Fahr. With its modern cabs, high-performance engines, and optional all-wheel drive, the series set new standards and strengthened the company's market position, particularly in the high-power and export segments.

=== The 07 Series ===
Introduced in 1980, the 07 series was a logical continuation of Deutz’s successful 06 series. Promoted under the advertising slogan “Spar Diesel – Fahr Deutz” (Save Diesel - Drive Deutz), the focus was placed on fuel efficiency, smooth operation, and proven technology. While visually similar to its predecessor, the series featured an expanded range of models and technical refinements. The first three-cylinder models—including the D 40 07, D 45 07, D 52 07, and D 57 07—were released in 1980, followed in 1982 by the D 48 07 and D 60 07. These tractors were optionally available with all-wheel drive and, beginning in 1981, also offered as “C” variants with comfort cabins.

From 1981, four-cylinder models such as the D 68 07, D 72 07, and D 78 07 were added, later joined by the D 62 07. The top model in this series was the D 78 07 C, offering 75 hp and equipped with Deutz's proprietary 12/4-speed transmission. In 1982, the two-cylinder models D 28 07 (29 hp) and D 36 07 (34 hp) were introduced, primarily targeting smaller farms. These versions were typically delivered without cabins and instead fitted with a Fritzmeier canopy.

The tractors of the 07 series were known for their ease of maintenance, powerful air-cooled engines, and improved ergonomics. The comfort-oriented “C” versions gained widespread acceptance in the mid-range power segment. As demand for smaller tractors declined, production of the two-cylinder models ended in 1988, while the higher-powered variants were gradually replaced by the modernized DX series.

=== The DX Series ===
With the introduction of the DX series in 1983, Deutz-Fahr undertook a fundamental modernization of its entire tractor lineup. Instead of the previous model naming conventions, the company introduced a new system based on power classes: the DX 4 class comprised four-cylinder models, the DX 6 class included six-cylinder tractors, while the DX 3 class (introduced later) focused on compact models. The DX 7 and DX 8 classes represented the high-horsepower segment.

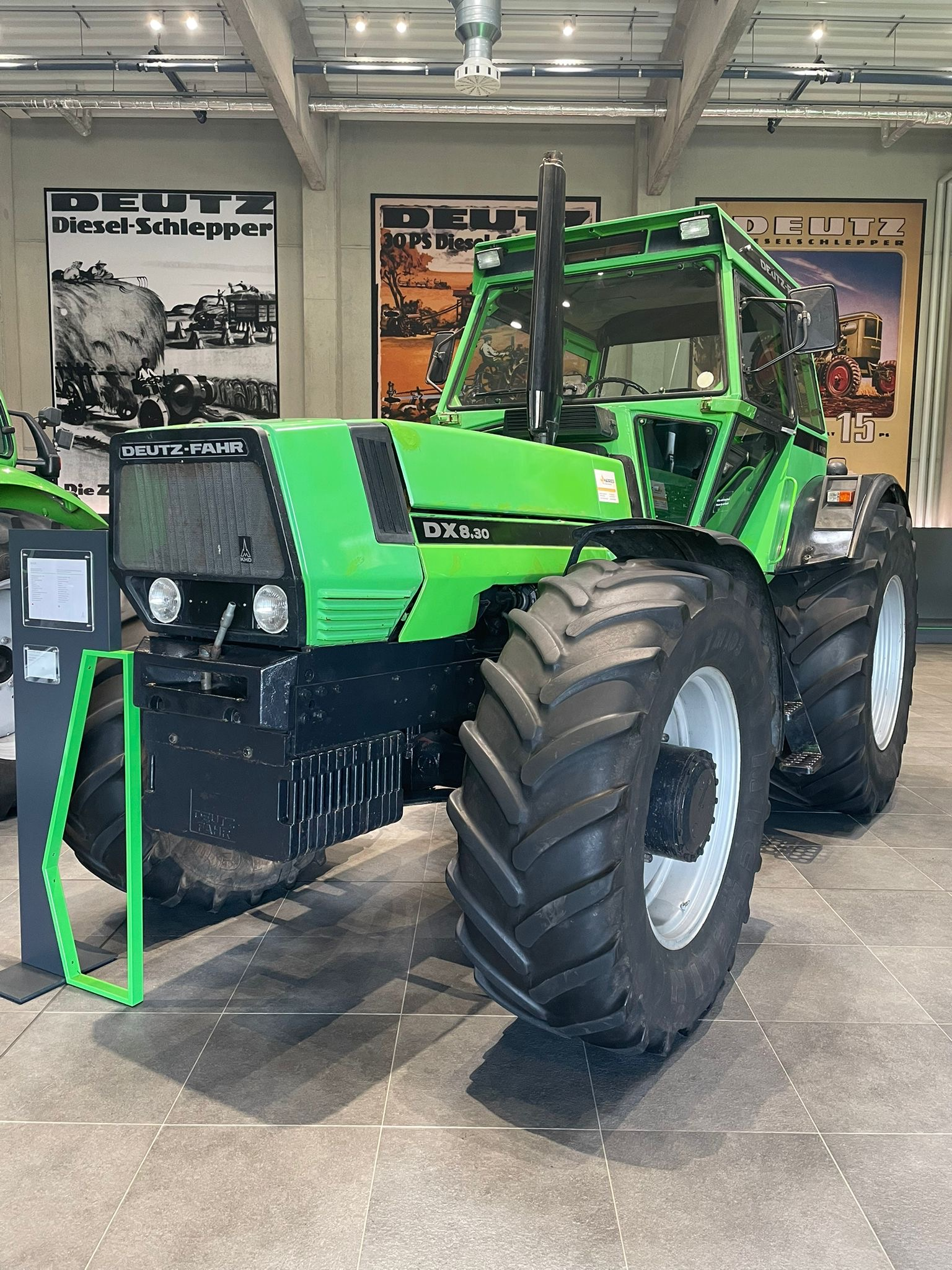
Deutz-Fahr DX 8.30, high-horsepower tractor from the DX series, produced in the mid-1980s by KHD.

Technically, the series featured fully synchronized transmissions with up to 24 forward and 12 reverse gears. Cabin design saw major improvements with the introduction of the MasterCab and later the StarCab, offering better sound insulation and all-round visibility. From 1986 onward, electronic assistance systems such as agrotroic-i (a board computer for performance and area monitoring) and agrotroic-h (electronically controlled hydraulics) were implemented. The tractors were primarily powered by air-cooled Deutz diesel engines from the F3L, F4L, and F6L 912 and 913 series, some with turbochargers.

The DX 4 class (e.g. DX 4.10 to DX 4.70) covered the 70 to 90 hp range and offered particularly high driving comfort. The DX 6 models (including DX 6.05, 6.30, 6.50) delivered between 98 and 135 hp and gained strong popularity. The compact DX 3 class (DX 3.10 to 3.90) offered 46 to 75 hp, and even these smaller models came equipped with modern cabs and onboard electronics as standard.

From 1984, Deutz-Fahr expanded its range to include high-horsepower tractors such as the DX 7.10 (160 hp), DX 8.30, and DX 250 (both 220 hp), which were specifically designed for heavy-duty arable farming.

The DX series is considered a milestone in Deutz-Fahr's history. It combined technical innovation with a high level of operator comfort and set new standards in model structuring. Its concept and design had a lasting influence on subsequent tractor generations and strengthened the brand’s position in international markets.

=== The Agro Series ===
With the introduction of the Agro series starting in 1989, Deutz-Fahr initiated a fundamental restructuring of its tractor portfolio. The aim was to segment the product range more clearly according to target groups, with the AgroPrima, AgroXtra, and AgroStar series covering different performance and equipment levels.

The AgroPrima models were aimed at small and medium-sized farms, combining robust technology with cost efficiency. Models such as the AgroPrima 4.31 to 6.16, with power outputs between 75 and 110 hp, featured the sound-insulated StarCab, the agrotronic-i information system, and fully synchronized transmissions with up to 24 gears. Engines were based on the proven 912 and 913 series, in some cases with turbocharging.

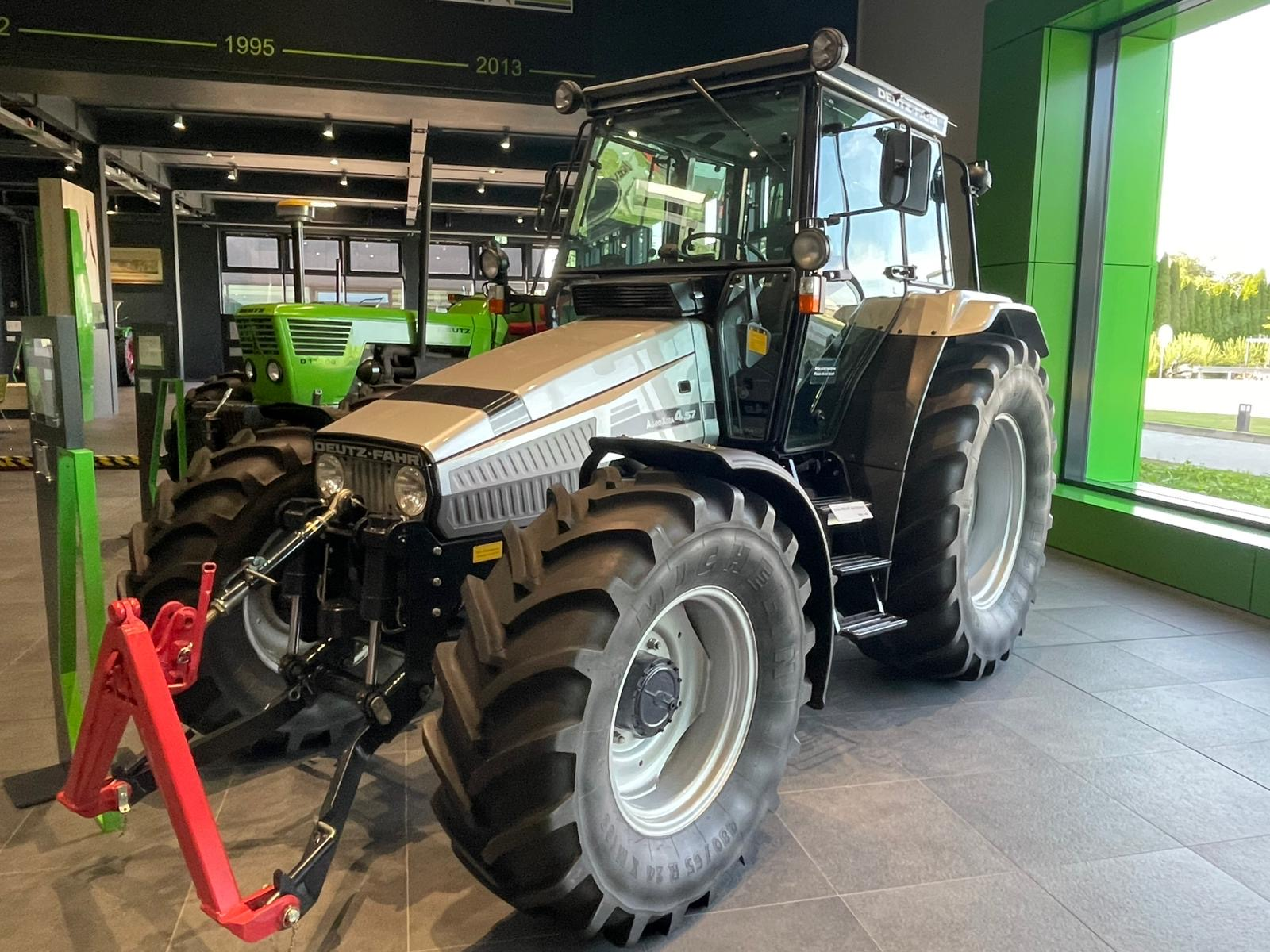
Deutz-Fahr AgroXtra 4.57, mid-size tractor from the 1990s.

The AgroXtra series was designed especially for front loader work and versatile use. A lowered engine hood and flat-profile cab improved forward visibility, while features such as a passenger seat, all-wheel drive, and the StarCab enhanced operator comfort. Power ratings ranged from 60 to 110 hp. In 1992, an AgroXtra 4.57 marked a historic milestone as the one-millionth Deutz tractor produced.

At the top end, the AgroStar series offered models with up to 230 hp, such as the AgroStar 8.31. These tractors came equipped with extensive comfort features, including quiet cabs with a noise level of just 72 dB(A), air-suspended seats, and electronic display panels branded AGROTRONIC-i. Later models also received a redesigned sloping engine hood and radar-based sensors for precision farming applications.

The Agro series marked the transition from conventional tractor engineering to a modern, technology-driven product structure at Deutz-Fahr. Thanks to modular equipment options and enhanced comfort, the series appealed to a broad customer base and laid the foundation for the later Agrotron series.

=== The Agrotron Series ===
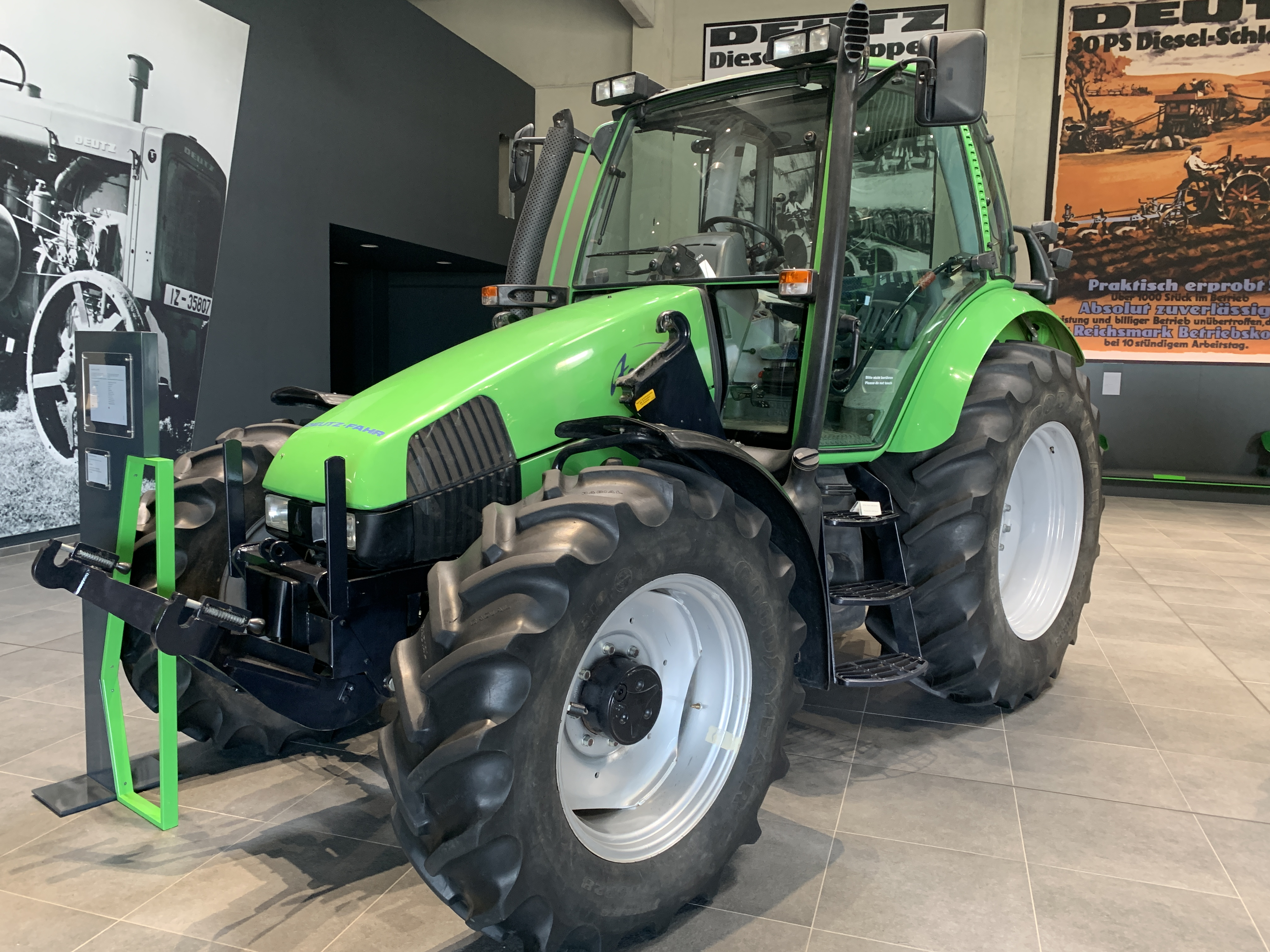
Deutz-Fahr Agrotron 6.15 MK1, high-performance tractor from the Agrotron series.

With the introduction of the Agrotron series starting in 1996, Deutz-Fahr—under the leadership of the SLH Group (Same-Lamborghini-Hürlimann)—initiated a comprehensive technological reboot. Production was relocated to Lauingen, air-cooled engines were replaced with water-cooled units, and a modern, comfort-focused cab design was introduced.

This new tractor generation was primarily aimed at medium and large-scale farms. In the second generation, launched in 1997/98 under the designation MK3, performance and build quality were further enhanced. Models such as the Agrotron 230 and 260, offering up to 256 hp, featured electronic engine management (EMR), which reduced fuel consumption and emissions. At the same time, the compact Agroplus series—based on the Same Dorado—was successfully positioned in the market.

A major innovation came with the introduction of the stepless TTV transmission in 2001. Developed in cooperation with ZF, this continuously variable transmission allowed load-dependent speed control and was particularly well-received by contractors and large-scale operations. In the following years, the model range expanded significantly. Between 2003 and 2005, the Agrotron 120 to 180.7 models were introduced as a new mid-range series with up to 182 hp, while the Agrotron 210 to 265 catered to international markets as high-horsepower tractors. The Agrotron K, launched in 2005 with 84 to 115 hp, was designed specifically for grassland and intensive livestock farms. The Agrotron X models, with up to 271 hp, targeted heavy-duty applications.

Further series followed in the late 2000s: in 2008, the Agrotron M was launched as a modern six-cylinder line featuring common rail injection and an optimized cab design. Introduced in 2007, the Agrofarm series addressed the compact mid-range segment with simplified features, in some versions also offering TTV transmissions. Positioned below the X series, the Agrotron L featured six-cylinder engines, high driving comfort, and assistance systems, making it suitable for continuous operation.

The Agrotron era marked Deutz-Fahr’s transformation into a more technologically advanced and international tractor manufacturer through a wide model range, innovative transmission technologies, and a focus on different customer segments.

=== The New Generation ===
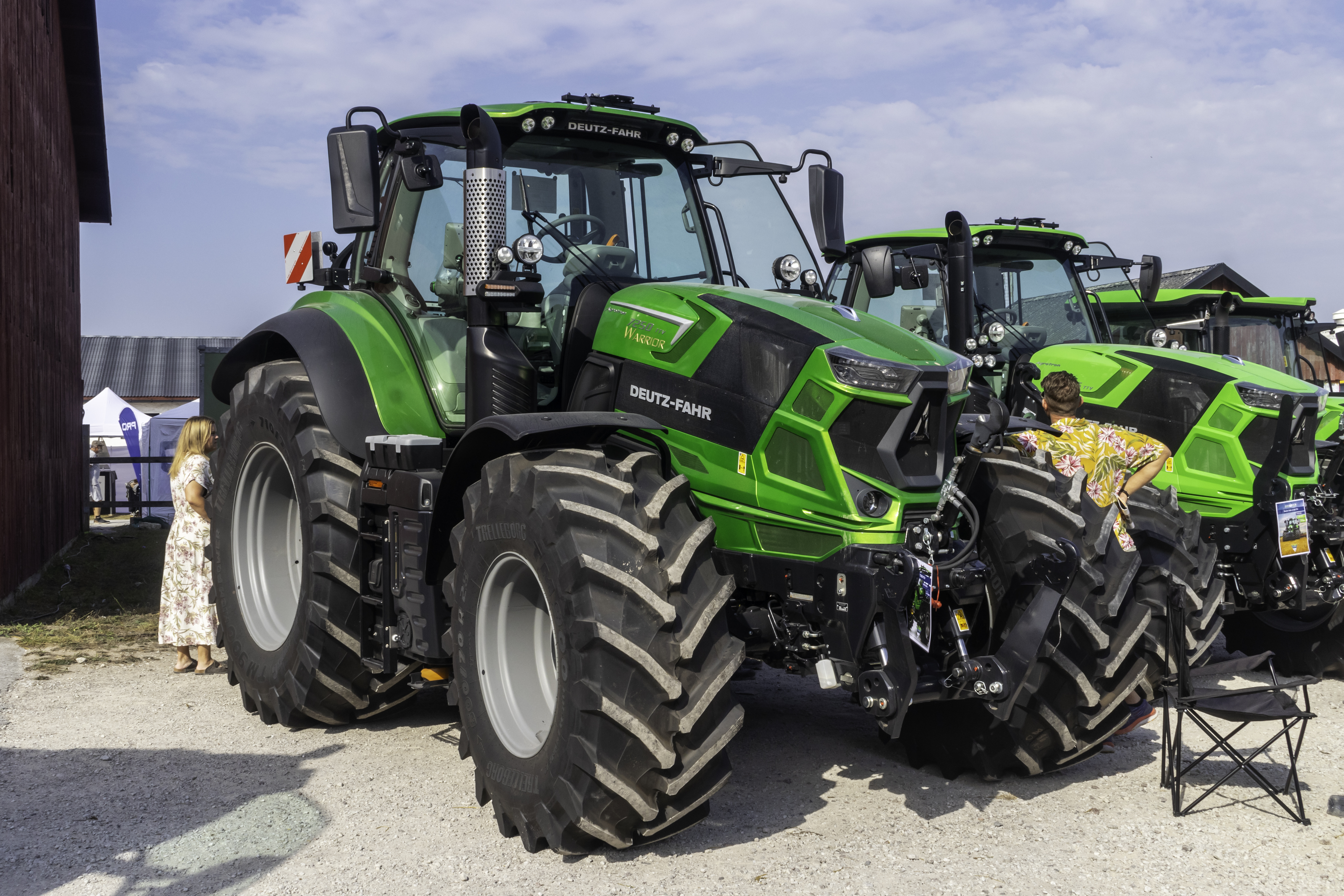
Deutz-Fahr 7250 TTV Warrior in java-green.

Starting in 2012, Deutz-Fahr fundamentally modernized its tractor program, introducing new model series that incorporated both technological and comfort-related advancements. The 6 Series, featuring models from 6150 to 6190, offered six-cylinder engines with outputs from 150 to 190 hp, complied with Stage III B emissions standards, and came with a newly developed comfort-oriented cab. In 2013, more compact four-cylinder models followed, and from 2014 onward, the stepless TTV transmission became optionally available across all variants. In 2016, the fully automatic RCShift transmission was introduced as an additional innovation.

The 7 Series launched with the 7210 TTV model, followed by the 7250 TTV, which was named “Tractor of the Year” in 2013. In 2015, the special edition 7250 TTV Warrior was released, featuring a black paint finish and extended equipment. In the compact tractor segment, the 5 Series was introduced at the 2013 SIMA trade fair, offering 100 to 130 hp. It was supplemented by the 5C Series (85–118 hp), 5D Series (75–103 hp) as successor to the Agroplus models, and the 5G Series. In the high-horsepower segment, Deutz-Fahr positioned itself with the 9 Series TTV, presented in 2013, with outputs up to 316 hp. The flagship 9340 TTV was awarded the “Golden Tractor for the Design” in 2015.

This new generation was characterized by numerous technological innovations. The TTV transmission enabled stepless power transfer, while the RCShift system handled automatic powershift operations. The Agrosky system introduced GPS-based guidance, and ISOBUS and AFIS (AgroFarm Information System) allowed digital connectivity between tractor and implements. The iMonitor 2 served as the central control terminal, while MaxCom and the MaxiVision 2 cab enhanced operating comfort. An electric hood opening system facilitated maintenance, and the Driver Extended Eyes system provided camera-based surroundings monitoring to improve operational safety.

== Special-purpose machines and equipment ==
=== Combine Harvesters ===
These machines are known for their technical robustness, innovative spirit, and broad model range – from trailed models to high-tech self-propelled harvesters with digital controls. The combine harvester tradition of Deutz-Fahr goes back to two manufacturers: Fahr from Gottmadingen and Ködel & Böhm (Köla) from Lauingen. As early as 1938, Fahr presented a self-propelled prototype combine harvester and began series production in 1951 with the MD 1 model. By 1968, over 27,000 combine harvesters had been produced. In the 1960s, Köla developed the Rex forage harvester, the first self-propelled machine with hydrostatic drive.

The following model series were introduced to the market:

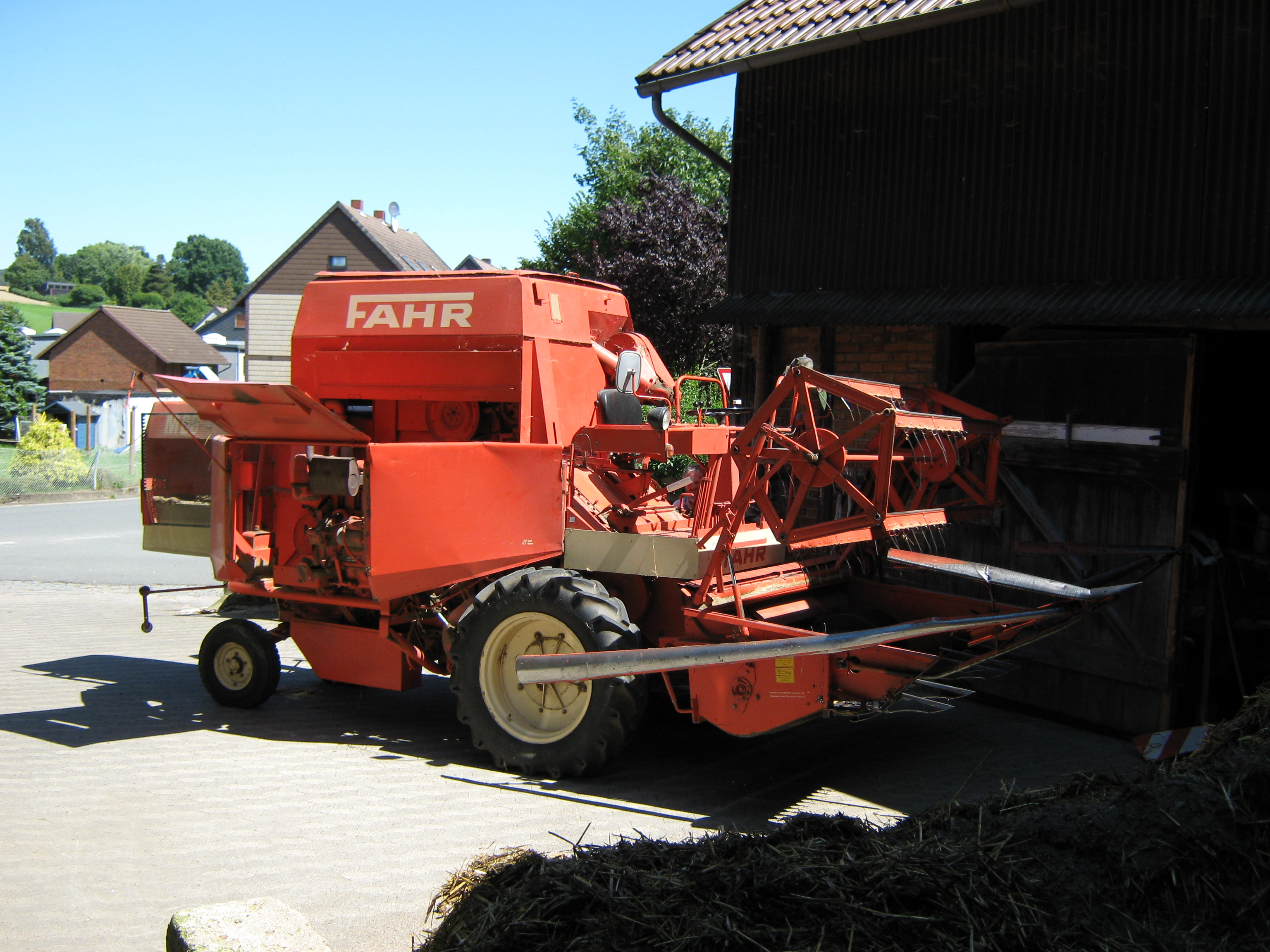
Red combine harvester type M66 by German manufacturer Fahr.

==== Early period (1950s–1970s) ====
- MD Series (MD 1–5): These were the first self-propelled machines, mechanically driven (45–70 hp).
- Trailed Models: M 66 T, M 122 T – powered via the PTO shaft, used by smaller farms.

==== M and TopLiner Series (1980s–2000s) ====
- M Series: Models like the M 35.78 with up to 160 hp and 5 straw walkers.
- TopLiner Series (from 1991): 205–240 hp, modern grain tank technology, optionally with slope compensation.

==== C Series (2000s–2025) ====
- C6000 Series: 5 straw walkers, 250 hp, ISOBUS-compatible, up to 7,000-liter grain tank.
- C9000 Series: 6 straw walkers, up to 353 hp, high-performance class with innovative threshing technology, large grain tank.

The machines were built in various equipment configurations and were mainly used in Europe, South America, and parts of Eastern Europe.

After KHD acquired Fahr in 1968, Lauingen became the center of combine harvester production for Deutz-Fahr. In the 1970s, annual production exceeded 3,000 units. Starting in 1982, combine harvesters were manufactured under license by Đuro Đaković in Croatia. In 1991, Deutz-Fahr presented the new TopLiner combine harvester series at the Agritechnica trade fair. In 2002, combine harvester production at the Lauingen plant was discontinued. Instead, Deutz-Fahr began sourcing combine harvesters from AGCO's plant in Randers, Denmark. After this cooperation ended in 2004, Deutz-Fahr began sourcing machines from Sampo Rosenlew. In 2006, SDF took over the Đuro Đaković combine harvester plant in Županja and has since expanded it into the group's own combine harvester production facility. In the previous year, 146 combine harvesters were produced at this plant. Through a cooperation with the Argentine manufacturer Vassalli Fabril, Deutz-Fahr was able to present its first rotary combine harvester at the EIMA trade fair in 2008. With the closure of the Croatian plant in February 2025, Deutz-Fahr ended its combine harvester production.

=== Telescopic Loaders ===
In 2004, the Deutz-Fahr Agrovector, a telescopic loader, was introduced. The series was produced in cooperation with JLG Industries. This partnership ended on October 1, 2017.

=== Grassland Equipment ===
Grassland technology came to Deutz-Fahr through Fahr. In 1988, it was decided to sell the grassland division, including the plant in Gottmadingen, to Greenland. Deutz-Fahr continued to offer corresponding machines in its product range. Initially, they were sourced from Greenland, and later, after Greenland was acquired by Kverneland, from Kverneland. As of September 2010, drum mowers and balers were supplied by Kuhn, as Kuhn had acquired the Geldrop baler plant from Kverneland along with its patents. The disc mowers, hay tedders, and windrowers were built by Kverneland until September 2017. The licensing agreement with Kverneland expired on September 1, 2017. From 2006 to 2017, Deutz-Fahr branded grassland machines were manufactured at the Kverneland plant in Kerteminde.

=== Other Machines ===
In 1989, the self-propelled mower Grasliner was introduced. In 1994, the self-propelled baler PowerPress followed, and two years later, the forage harvester Gigant 400. However, these machines were not successful in the market, and production of all three series was discontinued during the 1990s.

=== Market Share ===
In Germany, Deutz-Fahr achieved a market share of 7.8% in the tractor segment from 51 hp upwards in 2012, with 2,381 units sold, ranking 3rd behind John Deere (1st place, 21.2%) and Fendt (2nd place, 17.5%). In Austria, Deutz-Fahr ranked 7th in the registration statistics in 2012 with a market share of 5.7%. In Switzerland, Deutz-Fahr ranked 4th in 2012 with a market share of 9.5%.

== Models produced ==
| Baureihe | Erscheinungsjahr |
|---|---|
| Deutz Pfluglokomotive und Automobilpflug | 1907 |
| Deutz Trecker | 1919 |
| MTH und MTZ | 1927 |
| Deutz F2M 315 28 PS | 1934 |
| Deutz F3M 317 45 PS | 1935 |
| Deutz F1M 414 11 PS | 1936 |
| 514 | 1950 |
| 612 | 1953 |
| Deutz F2L514/4-N | 1957 |
| 712 | 1958 |
| D-Series (D15 – D80) | 1959 |
| D-05 (D2505 – D9005) | 1965 |
| D-06 (D2506 – D16006, latter as an articulated tractor) | 1968 |
| Deutz INTRAC (2002–2006) | 1972 |
| DX (DX 85 – DX 160) | 1978 |
| D-07 (D2807 – D7807) | 1980/ 81 |
| AgroPrima (DX4.31 – DX6.16) (6.16 erst ab ’93) | 1989 |
| AgroXtra (DX3.57 – DX6.17) | 1991 |
| AgroStar (DX4.61 – DX6.81) | 1990 |
| Agrotron (80 – 265) | 1995 |
| Agrotron TTV (610 – 630) | 2003 |
| Agrotron K (K90 – K120) | 2006 |
| Agroplus (320 – 420) | 2002 |
| Agrokid (210 – 230) | 2000 |
| Agrofarm (410 – 430) | 2007 |
| Agrotron X (X710 – X720) | 2007 |
| Agrotron TTV (TTV610 – TTV630) | 2007 |
| Agrotron TTV (TTV 410 – 430) | 2011 |
| Agrotron K (K410, K420, K430, K610) | 2007 |
| Agrotron M (M410 – 420, M615 und M625, M600 – M650) | 2008 |
| Agrofarm TTV | 2008 |
| Agro XXL 1630 | 2009 |
| Agrolux | 2010 |
| Series 3 | today |
| Series 5 TB | today |
| Series 5DF (Plattform) | today |
| Series 5DF/DS/DV Ecoline | today |
| Series 5DF/DS/DV | today |
| Series 5 DF/DS/DV PRO | today |
| Series 5 DF/DS/DV TTV | today |
| Series 5DF Keyline | today |
| Series 4E | today |
| Series 5D | today |
| Series 5D TTV | today |
| Series 5 Keyline | today |
| Series 5 | today |
| Series 5D Keyline | today |
| Series 6C | today |
| Series 6.4 | today |
| Series 6 | today |
| Series 7 | today |
| Series 8 | today |
| Series 9 | today |

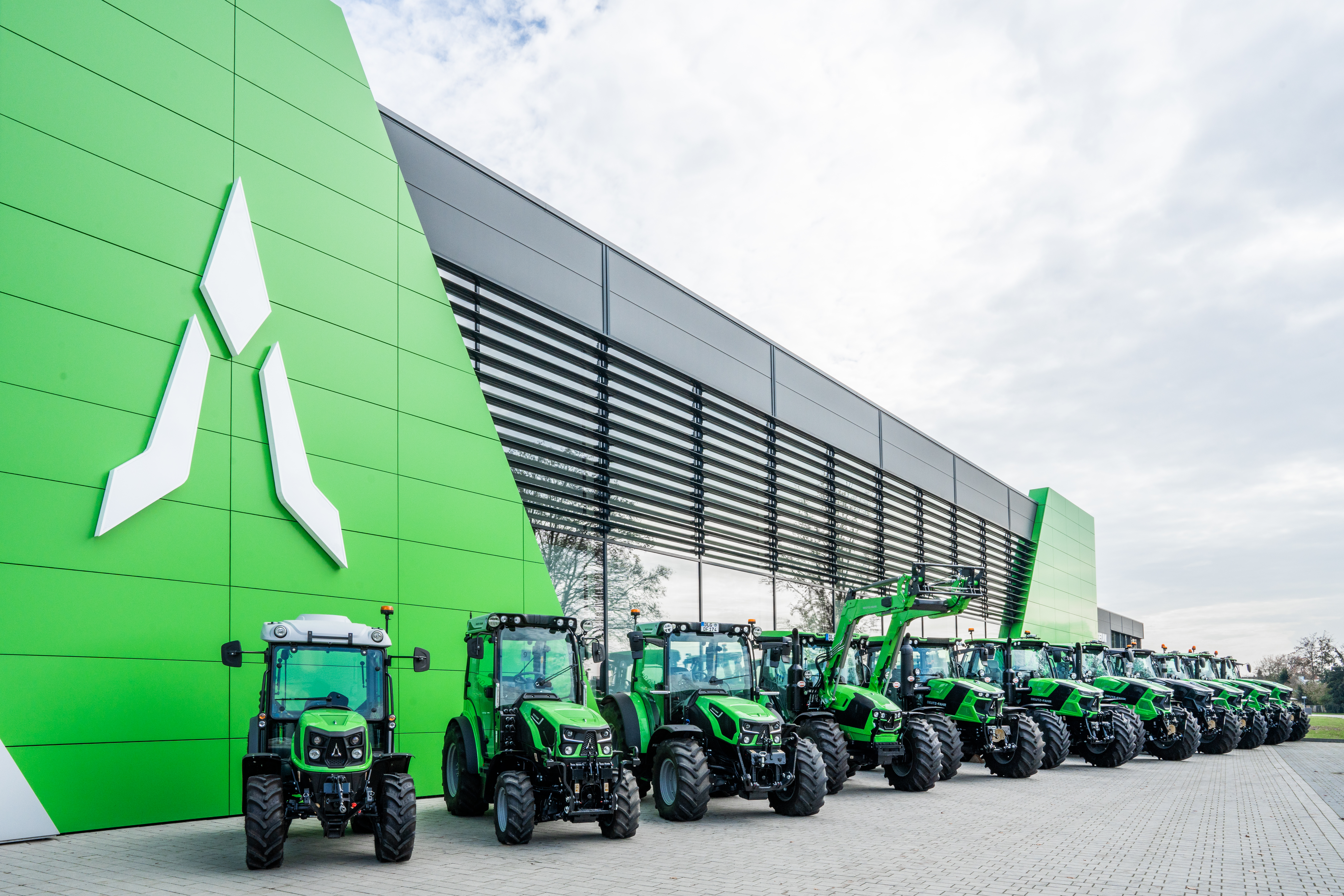
DEUTZ-FAHR product range in front of the Deutz-Fahr Arena in Lauingen.

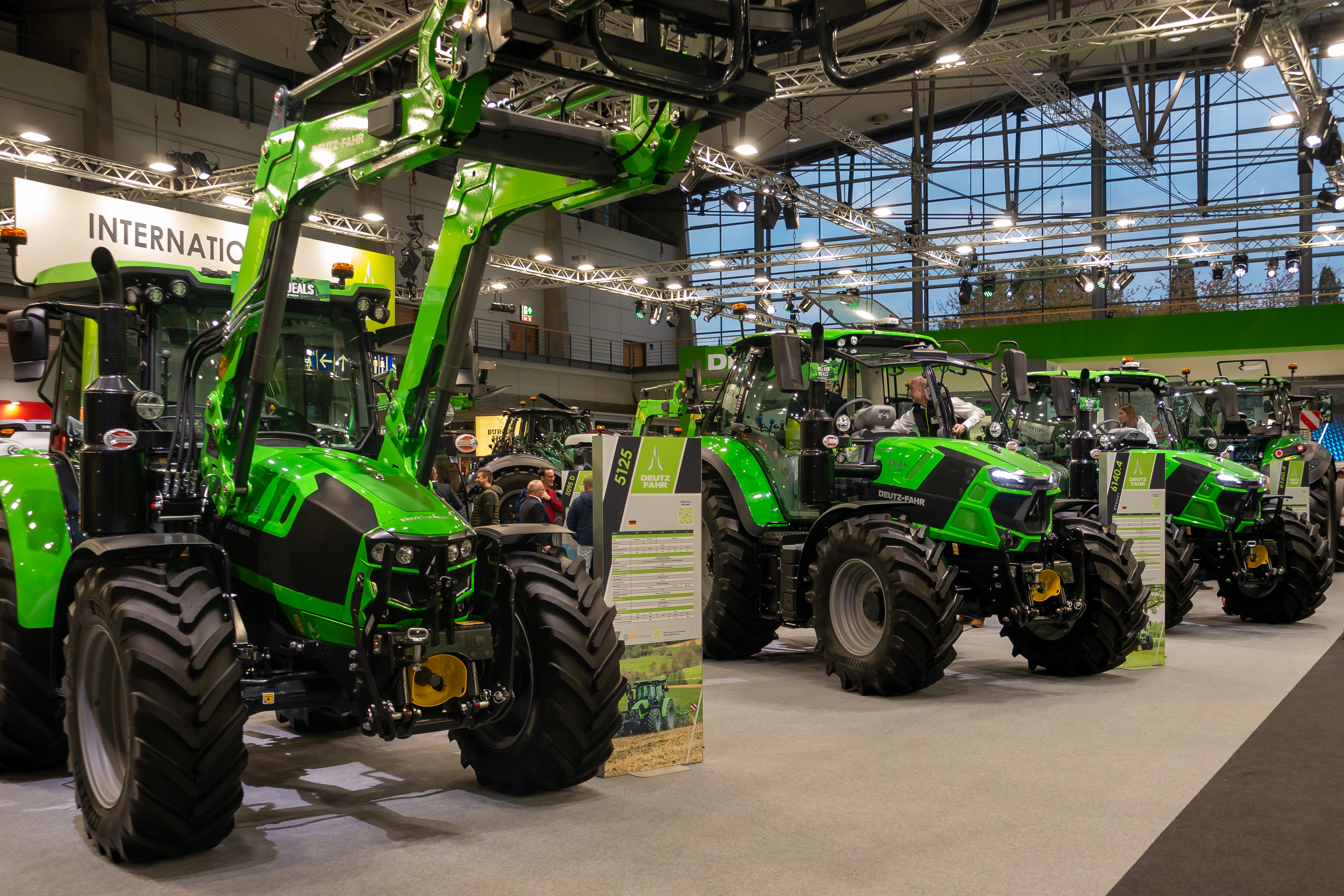
Deutz-Fahr at Agritechnica 2023.

== See also ==
- Tractor
- Combine harvester
- SDF Group
- SAME (tractors)
- Lamborghini Trattori
- Hürlimann
