= Karasik =

Karasik, Karasick or Karassik is a Slavic-language surname literally meaning "little karas", i.e., "little crucian carp". It can be a metonymic occupational surname for a fisher, or a nickname for a person with face resembling carp. It can also be a Jewish artificial surname. Notable people with the surname include:

- Adeena Karasick, (born 1965), Canadian poet, performance artist, and essayist
- Elissa Karasik, American screenwriter
- Igor Karassik, Russian-American engineer
- Paul Karasik, American cartoonist
- Regina Karasick, birth name of Peggy Dennis (1909–1993), American–Russian journalist, author, and Communist activist
- Yuli Karasik, Soviet film director

== Fictional characters ==
- Karasik in An Israeli Love Story
- Karasik in 1958 Russian children's book Dunno in Sun City

== See also ==
- Karas (surname)
- Karasek
- Karasiak
- Corasick
