= Magnus Agricola =

German Lutheran superintendent and theologian

Magnus Agricola (c. 1556 – September 28/29, 1605) was a German Lutheran superintendent and theologian.

The nephew of Renaissance humanist and statesman Peter Agricola, he became church minister as well as superintendent and ecclesiastical inspector at Neuburg an der Donau (Bavaria). He authored several books on Lutheranism and took part to the Religionsgespräch of Regensburg (1601), where he opposed Roman Catholics.

== Personal life ==
Agricola was born in the German municipality of Holzheim and spent his childhood in the Ulm area.

His famous uncle was the founder and rector of the Gymnasium Illustre in Lauingen, Bavaria (Magnus Agricola's future school) and later became councilor and State minister of the reigning Dukes of Zweibrücken and Pfalz-Neuburg, while his grandfather, also named Magnus Agricola, was a judge and administrator of Holzheim. The senior Agricola was educated at Ingolstadt, Bavaria and, planning to join the Benedictine Abbey of Elchingen, moved to Rome at a Benedictine cardinal’s (Jean Bilhères de Lagraulas). However, due to problems in Rome, including the nepotism of Pope Alexander VI and the belligerent behavior of the future Pope Julius II, the senior Agricola enlisted in the Imperial Troops. Thus, he became involved in King Charles VIII of France's Italian war (1494/95-1497). Eventually, he returned to Germany, where he later showed interest in Martin Luther's work.

On January 10, 1586 at Lauingen, Agricola married Anna Maria Motz, whose father was a former student of the University of Tübingen and the princely chief tax collector of Pfalz-Neuburg. Motz's brother-in-law (and friend of Agricola) was Dietrich (Theodor) Hess, councilor of the reigning Duke of Neuburg, diplomatic envoy to Denmark and the Court of St. James (London), and permanent ambassador to the Court of France in Paris under King Henri IV and Queen-regent Mary de Medici.

Agricola had a son who received a master's degree from the University of Wittenberg. His grandson was an alumnus of the Universities of Tübingen and Wittenberg. Both descendants became Lutheran church ministers. A son-in-law, Johannes Münderlein, was the last Lutheran bishop of Neuburg (1617) and then Superintendent of Regensburg.

Agricola fell ill with apoplexy and died in the early hours of September 29, 1605, in Neuburg an der Donau. His funeral was conducted by Jacob Heilbrunner, preacher at the court of Pfalz-Neuburg. Heilbrunner described the late Agricola as 'an active, honest and assiduous man who was dedicated to his colleagues, superintendents, church ministers and teachers of all the principality; [he was] also dedicated to his parishioners and known to all'.

== Education ==
Agricola entered the "Gymnasium Illustre" at age ten, in 1566. He showed promise, so in 1575, Prince Philip Louis, Count Palatine of Neuburg sponsored Agricola's ongoing theological studies.

On January 5, 1576, Agricola registered at the University of Tübingen (Württemberg) as Magnus Agricola Holtzensis. He received his "Baccalaureus" on March 27, 1577, and a "Magister" degree on July 30, 1578. He continued his university studies until 1582.

== Ecclesiastical career ==
Agricola held a number of ecclesiastical posts (Pfarrer, Konsistorialrat, Inspektor, Kirchenrath, Konsistorialassessor) in Neuburg an der Donau, Bavaria in a career spanning three decades.

His first post was deacon of St Peter's of Neuburg (1582–1583). He then became the minister of the Frauenkirche (1583–1599). From 1599 to 1603, he was Hofdiakon at the Palace of the Court of Neuburg. From 1603 until his death in 1605, Agricola was the Superintendent (Lutheran bishop) of Neuburg.

== Contribution to the Lutheran church ==
As theologian of the Duke of Neuburg, Agricola took part in the Neuburg Ecumenical Councils of 1593, where Lutherans debated Calvinists and in the Religionsgespräch of Regensburg in 1601, where Lutherans opposed Catholics.

Agricola authored several books on Lutheranism. Among them was Von der Katholischen Christlichen Lehre Augsburgischer Konfession, und dem Unkatholischen Heydensüchtigen Papstum, a book of some 300 pages published in 1599 and re-published in 1602.

From 1602 to 1605, Agricola supervised the building of the new church (Frauenkirche) of Neuburg.

== Publications ==
- Propositiones de Creation. Disputationis gratia propositae in Collegio Lauingano, 2. Decemb. Anno 1575. Praeside M. PHILIPPO HAILBRUNNERO, Theologiae professore : Respondente vero MAGNO AGRICOLA Holtzensi. Lauingen : Philippus ULHARDUS, 1575. 16 p. ex. numérisé, Studienb. Dillingen, BSB München
- Disputatio, DE SCRIPTURAE SACROSANCTAE INTERPRETATIONE. Sancta et individuae Triadis auspicio, Authore & Praeside, JACOBO HEERBRANDO DOCTORE ET PROFESSORE S.S. Theologiae in inclyta Tubingensi Academia, Rectorea Magnifico, Praeceptore suo omniobservantia colendo. M. Magnus Agricola Holtzensis, Febru 3 in Aula nova, hora septima, exercitis causa, pro virili respondebit. Tübingen : Alexander HOGGIUM, 1582. 28 p. (ex. Ratsbibiliothek Weißenburg)
- Christliche Leichpredig, Uber der Begräbnuß, Weilund deß Ehrnvesten Hochgelerten Herren Johann Frölichs von Laugingen, der Rechten Doctorn unnd fürstlichen Pfalzgràvischen Raths zu Neuburg an der Donaw so der orten, den 17. Aprilis, dises lauffenden Jars, seligklich inn Christo verschieden : Gehalten den 19. Aprilis / Durch M. Magnum Agricolam, Pfarrern bey vnser Frawen daselbsten. Lauingen : Leonhardt REINMICHEL, 1594. 28 p. (ex. Bibl. St. Mang. Kempten, Eichstätt)
- Christliche Leichpredig, Uber der Begräbnuß, Weilund deß Ehrenvesten Herrn Pauli Rabus von Memmingen, Fürstlichen Pfaltzgrävischen Lehenprobsts, Secretarien unnd Registratorn zu Neuburg an der Donaw : Gehalten den 4. Octobris, Anno 1594. Durch M. Magnum Agricolam, Pfarrern zu unser Frawen daselbst. Lauingen : Leonhard REINMICHEL, 1594. 19 p. (ex. SB Augsburg et StB Nördlingen)
- Von der Catholischen Christlichen Lehre Augspurgischer Confession, Vnd dem Vncatholischen Heydensüchtigen Pabstumb : Wider die Päbstlische Bezüchtigung, Das durch die Freystellung Augspurgischer Confession ein Vncatholische, newe, ärgerliche Confusion in der Christlichen Kirchen geduldet oder freygestellet, und dadurch zur gänzlichen Verwirrung der Christenheit und Wiedereinführung eines barbarischen Heidenthums und Egyptischen Finsterniss Ursach gegeben werden, Lauingen, Leonhardt REINMICHEL, 1599. 302 p. (ex. BNU Strasbourg, SB Augsburg, Studienb. Dillingen, FB Gotha, BSB München, Staatl. B. Regensburg, LB Stuttgart, HAB Wolfenbüttel)
- Narratio Historica de Vita et Obitu M. Petri Agricolae, Consiliarii Palatini Neuburgici, ac Bipontini, Conscripta à M. Magno Agricola, Pastore gregis Dominici ad B.Mariam Virginem, Neuburgi. IN : Oratio In Obitvm Clarissimi, Atqve Omni Liberali Scientia politissimi viri, ... Petri Agricolae, quondam ... Philippi Lvdovici, & D. Ioannis, Com. Palatinorum Rheni, & Boiariae Ducum, fratrum Praeceptoris, & postea Consiliarij : Habita In Schola Palatinâ Lauinganâ / à S. Ostermanno, I. V. Doctore, eiusdem scholae Rectore. Lauingen : Vve Leonhard REINMICHEL, 1600. 63f. (Studienb. Dillingen, UB Heidelberg, Staatl. B. Neuburg/Donau (verlust), Staatl. B. Regensburg)
- Gründlicher Beweis/ das es nicht war sey/ Das durch die Augspurgische Confession zu widereinführung eines Barbarischen Heydenthum[m]s ursach geben werde. Und Gegensatz/ Das zu solcher einführung viel mehr das widerwertige Papstumb ursach und anleytung gebe : Wider Das Päpstische und diß Jahr abermal getruckte Buch von der Autonomia, darinn der Christlichen Lehre Augspurgischer Confession gedachtes Heydenthum[m] zugemessen wirdt / Durch M. Magnum Agricolam, Pfarrherrn zu Newburg an der Thonaw. Lauingen : Jacob WINTER, in Verlegung Sebastian MÜLLERS, 1602. 301p. (ex. UB Halle, LB Stuttgart, BU Wroclaw)

== Sources ==
- AGRICOLA (Magnus), Supplement zu dem Baselischen allgemeinen historischen Lexicon, 1742
- AGRICOLA (Magnus), Nachrichten von Gelehrten, Künstlern und andern merkwürdigen Personen aus Ulm, Albrecht Weyermann, 1829
- "AGRICOLA (Magnus), a écrit en allemand un livre, pour prouver qu'il n'est pas vrai que par la confession d'Augsbourg, on donne lieu au rétablissement du Panagisme, et un autre de la catholique confession d'Augsbourg, aussi en allemand" (Le grand dictionnaire historique ou Le mélange curieux de l'Histoire sacrée et profane, Louis Moreri, Desaint et Saillant, Paris, 1759)
