= Cyprián Karásek Lvovický =

Bohemian astronomer, mathematician and astrologer (died 1574)

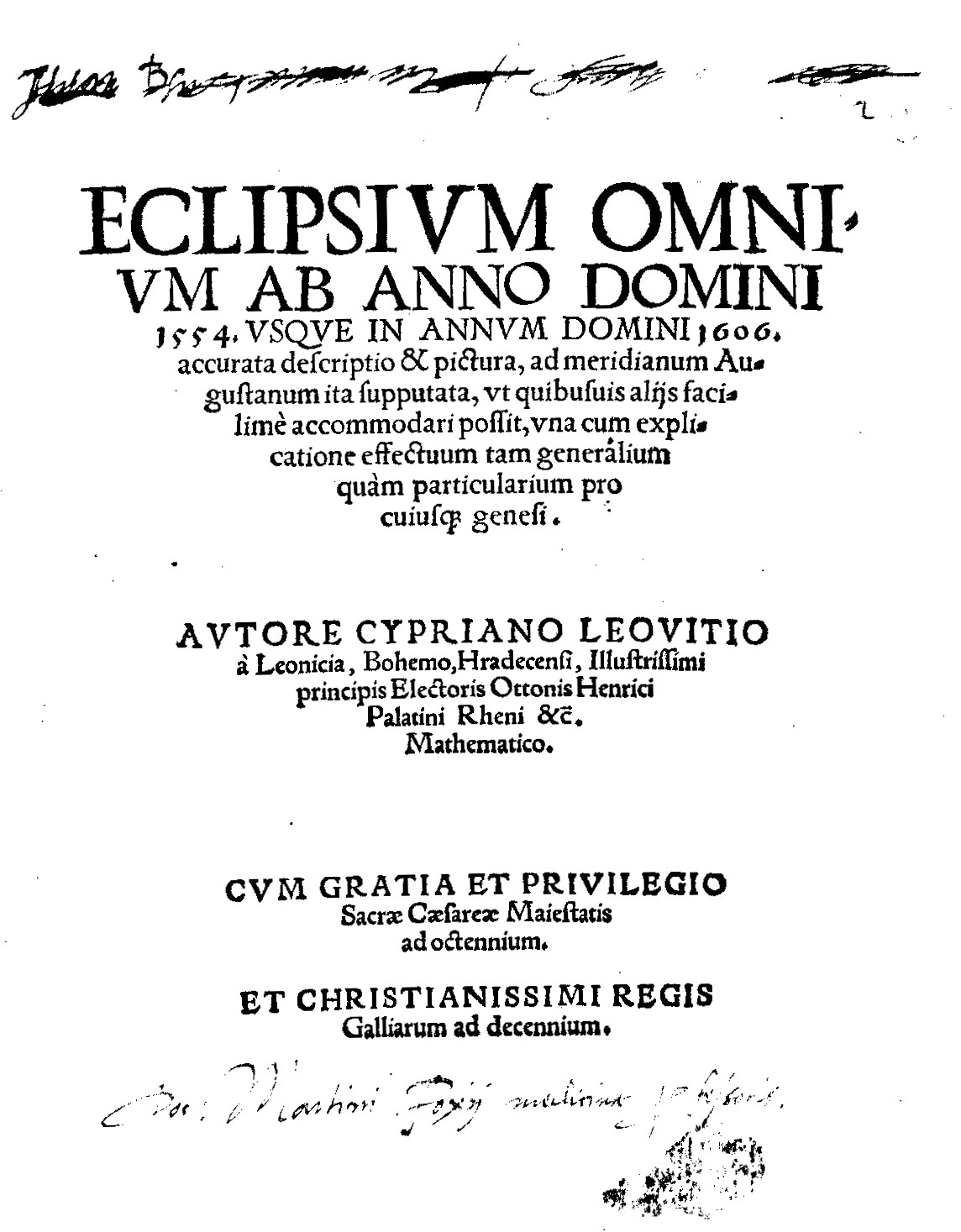
Eclipsium omnium ab anno Domini 1554 vsque in annum Domini 1606 accurata descriptio et pictura, 1556

Cyprián Karásek Lvovický (of Lvovice) (Czech: Cyprián Karásek Lvovický ze Lvovic, German: Cyprian von Leowitz, Latin: Cyprianus Leovitius) (born July 1514/1524, Hradec Králové – died 1574, Lauingen) was a Bohemian astronomer, mathematician and astrologer.

== Career ==
Most of the information about Lvovický's life comes from his memoirs. Cyprian Karásek was born in 1514 (some sources claim 1524) into the family of a long-time town councillor and later mayor of Hradec Králové named Jan Karásek (Lvovický after ennoblement). He received his elementary education in the Hradec Králové town school and then moved on to study abroad. In 1540, Lvovický studied in Wrocław (Breslau), in 1542 in Leipzig and later astronomy and mathematics in Wittenberg. In 1547, he moved to Nuremberg, then to Augsburg, to the court of Fuggers. After 1556 Otto Henry, Count Palatine of Palatinate-Neuburg (later Elector Palatine), named Lvovický professor of astronomy and mathematics at the Latin "particular school" in Lauingen. Lvovický later became the director of that school, working there until 1566.

From 1565 through 1568, he visited Bohemia several times and planned to return to Hradec Králové, but he died before that plan was realized. Lvovický published several astronomical works in Latin. Being both an astronomer and an astrologer, he tried to base astrology on solid mathematical and astronomical ground. His first published work was "Tabulae eclipsum", predicting (within a few minutes) the start and the duration of lunar eclipses until 1605, including towns where it would be observable. These tables were based on the work of Erasmus Reinhold.

In 1564, by order of Maximilian II, he published detailed ephemeris tables for the sun, moon and other celestial bodies covering the years 1564 - 1574 in 10-day intervals and titled "De coniunctionibus magnis insignoribus superiorum planetarum, solis defectibus, et de cometis effectum historica expositione". In this book, recorded astronomical phenomena were linked with historical events (e.g. death of John of Luxembourg with a comet appearing in 1347). The work "Tabulae Peuerbachii Alphonsiane" from 1556 earned the respect of Tycho Brahe; they met in 1569 and corresponded thereafter.

== Personal life ==
Lvovický married Diana Clelius (died 24 November 1581, aged 47), widow of Heinrich Elephantius, a former councilor to Elector Otto-Henry. After his death, she married for a third time, to Peter Agricola, in 1575 at Lauingen.

== Literature ==
- František Jáchym: Cyprián Lvovický ze Lvovic - matematik, astronom, astrolog, Matematika-fyzika-informatika, 14 2004/2005 (in Czech). Other publications by Jáchym may cover Lvovický as well.
- Lvovický's life in Lauingen, Hradec Králové astronomical journal Povětroň, 2004, No 1, p. 16. (in Czech)
