= Annamária Szalai =

Hungarian academic and politician (1961–2013)

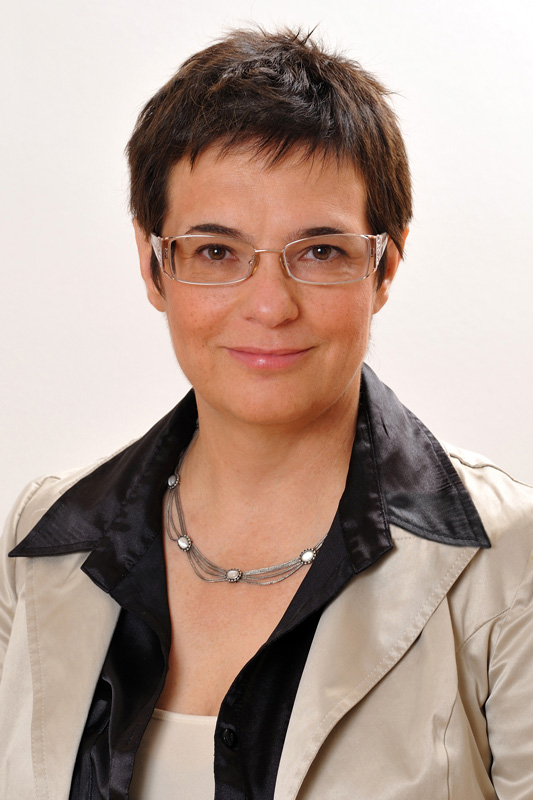
- Szalai in 2012

President of the National Media and Infocommunications Authority
- In office 12 October 2010 – 12 April 2013
- Preceded by: László Majtényi (as President of the ORTT)
- Succeeded by: Monika Karas

Member of the National Assembly
- In office 18 June 1998 – 30 March 2004

Personal details
- Born: 16 September 1961 Zalaegerszeg, Hungary
- Died: 12 April 2013 (aged 51) Budapest, Hungary
- Party: Fidesz (1991–2013)
- Profession: politician, journalist

Annamária Szalai (16 September 1961 – 12 April 2013) was a Hungarian journalist, politician, Member of Parliament (MP) for Zala County, Fidesz (1998–2004). She became a member of the National Radio and Television Commission (ORTT) in 2004, and as a result resigned from her parliamentary seat. Szalai served as President of the National Media and Infocommunications Authority (NMHH) from 2010 until her death.
