= Aleksandr Karasyov =

Aleksandr Karasyov or Alexander Karasyov (Russian: Александр Карасёв) may refer to:

- Aleksandr Karasyov (archaeologist) (1902–1972) Soviet historian and archaeologist
- Aleksandr Karasyov (pilot) (1916–1991)
- Aleksandr Karasyov (politician) (1914–1968) - Soviet economy, state and political figure, deputy of the Supreme Soviet of the USSR
- Aleksandr Karasyov (writer) (born 1971)
