= Aleksandr Karasyov (writer) =

Russian writer

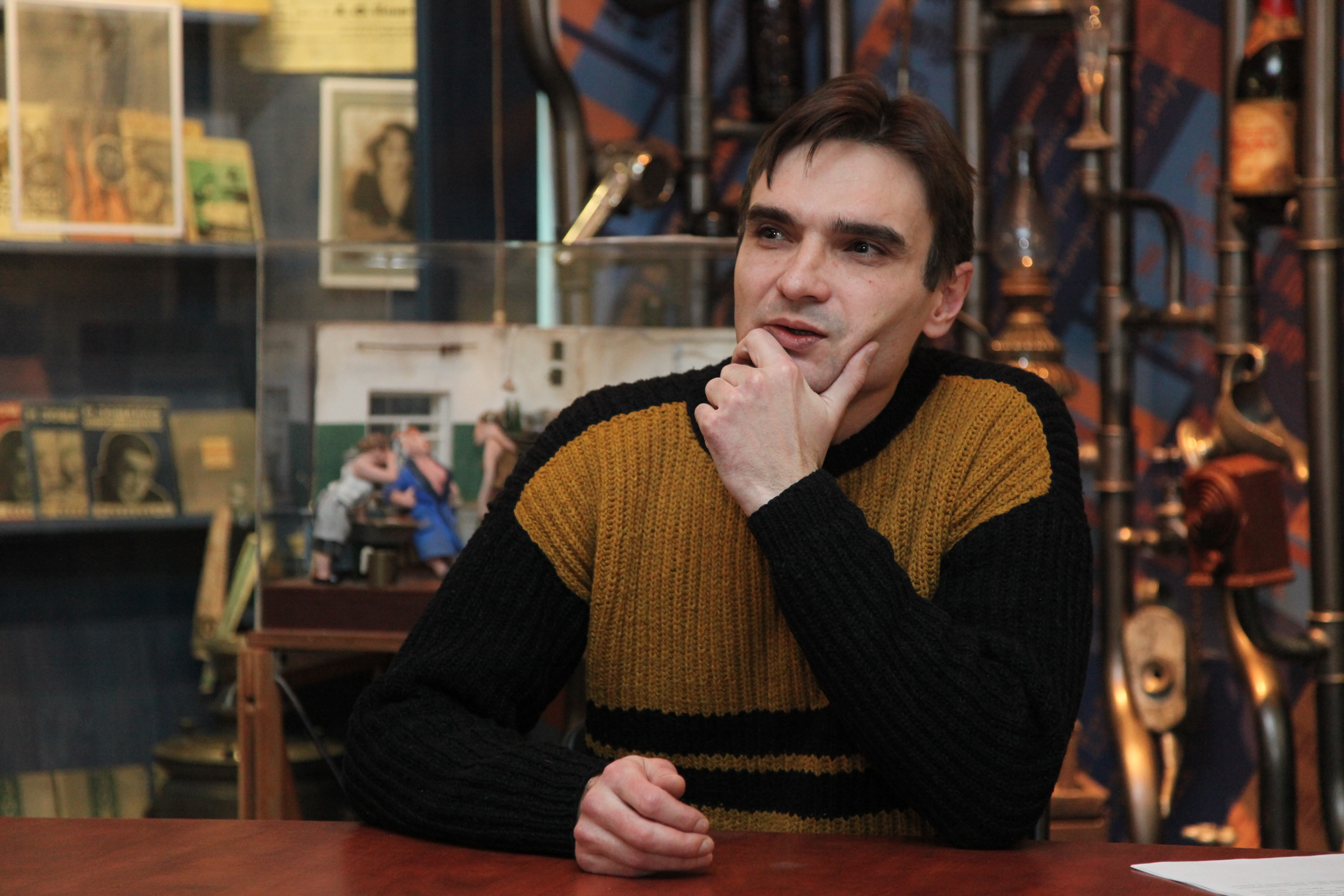
- Aleksander Karasyov – Evening at the Zoshchenko Museum
- Born: Aleksandr Vladimirovich Karasyov; 1971 (age 54–55); Krasnodar, Soviet Union
- Education: Kuban State University
- Occupation: Writer
- Writing career
- Language: Russian
- Period: 21st century, Second Chechen War
- Genres: Short stories, poems, prose
- Notable works: Chechenskiye Rasskazy, Predatel
- Notable awards: Bunin Prize (2008); Second O. Henry Prize "Dary Volhvov" (The Gift of the Magi) (New York, 2010)
- Movement: Russian War Prose
- Website: alexanderkarasyov.wordpress.com

Aleksandr Karasyov (Russian — Александр Владимирович Карасёв, transl. Aleksandr Vladimirovich Karasyov) is a Russian writer living in St. Petersburg, Russia.

== Biography ==
Aleksandr Karasyov was born in Krasnodar, Russia, in 1971. He received degrees in history and law from the Kuban State University and worked as a mechanic, engineer, teacher, and legal advisor. He served in the army, taking part in the fights in Chechnya.

Since 2003 he has been published in literary journals. He was awarded the Bunin Prize (2008) and the Second O. Henry Prize "Dary Volhvov" (The Gift of the Magi) (New York, 2010). He is the author of the books "The Chechen Stories" (Chechenskye Rasskazy) and "Traitor" (Predatel').

Aleksandr Karasyov is known for Russian military prose. Some critics describe him a representative of the Russian "new realism" movement of the 21st century, continuing the tradition of the "lieutenant prose" of the 1960s and 1970s and military prose of the 1990s, although Karasyov himself strongly denies this label.

== Books ==
- Сhechen Stories (Russian — Чеченские рассказы, transl. Chechenskiye Rasskazy). — Moscow: Literary Russia, 2008. ISBN 978-5-7809-0114-3.
- Traitor (Russian — Предатель, transl. Predatel'). — Ufa: Vagant, 2011. ISBN 978-5-9635-0344-7.

In his Chechen Stories and Traitor, which are regarded as examples of modern Russian military prose, Alexander Karasyov gives insights into life in the Russian army during the Second Chechen War. Presenting a modern war and modern warfare, the author does not rely on second hand information but on his own experience. The short stories are often as tragicomical as the Russian army itself and show Karasyov's characters not only in the war but also in their lives outside the war in their civilian life, or their so-called "life in peace" (“мирная жизнь”).

== Publications in anthologies ==
- Современная литература народов России (Modern Literature of the Peoples of Russia) (2005). Moscow: Pik. ISBN 978-5-7358-0288-4
- Народ мой — большая семья: Литература наших дней. (My People — A Big Family. Literature of Our Days) (2007). Moscow: Literaturnaya Rossiya. ISBN 978-5-7809-0111-2
- Четыре шага от войны (Four Steps from War) (2010). Sankt Saint Petersburg: Limbus Press. ISBN 978-5-8370-0538-1
- Дары волхвов 2.0 (The Gift of the Magi) (2012). New York.

== Bibliography ==
- Silver, Courtney. Criticism and Complaint In Soldiers’ Narratives of the Chechen Wars. Master thesis. University of Colorado, Boulder, 2017.
