= Mieczysław Karaś =

Polish linguist

Mieczysław Karaś (1924–1977) was a Polish linguist.
