= Andrey Karasyow =

Belarusian footballer

Personal information
- Date of birth: 26 May 1991 (age 35)
- Place of birth: Brest, Belarusian SSR
- Height: 1.75 m (5 ft 9 in)
- Position: Midfielder

Youth career
- 2008–2012: Dinamo Brest

Senior career*
Years	Team	Apps	(Gls)
2010–2014	Dinamo Brest	5	(0)
2012–2014	→ Volna Pinsk (loan)	59	(7)
2015	Kobrin	14	(0)
2020	Pershy Rehiyon	12	(2)
2021	Brestzhilstroy	11	(0)
- * Club domestic league appearances and goals as of 31 December 2021

Andrey Karasyow (Belarusian: Андрэй Карасёў; Russian: Андрей Карасёв; born 26 May 1991) is a Belarusian former professional footballer.
