= Igor Karassik =

Russian-American engineer (1911–1995)

Karassik explaining flow equations

Igor J. Karassik (Russian: Игорь Иванович Карасик) (December 1, 1911 in Saint Petersburg, Russian Empire – July 2, 1995 in Maplewood, New Jersey) was a Russian-American engineer known for his pioneering work with pumps, a field in which he was "world-renowned" and an "outstanding authority".

== Early life ==
Karassik was born to a wealthy Russian-Jewish family. His father, a mechanical engineer, John (Ivan) Karassik (1880—1969) was a son of a Kharkov merchant Nukhim-Perets (Peter) Karasik (c. 1849—1906). His mother Malvina nee Barjansky (1882—1967) was a daughter of an Odessa 1st guild merchant, composer, and pianist Adolf Barjansky (c. 1850—1900). Igor had an older sister Helen (1909—1990). The family emigrated from Russia to escape the Russian Revolution and naturalized the United States in 1923. His father went to America alone first, naturalized (with the whole family) after 6 years of residence, and then sent for his family. The rest of the family arrived to the United States in 1928, after living five years in Turkey and five years in France.

He attended Carnegie Institute of Technology, and also studied in Turkey and France.

== Professional life ==
In 1934 or 1936, Karassik joined the Worthington Corporation; by 1974, he was a vice-president. He subsequently worked for Dresser Industries. In 1980, he became the first recipient of the American Society of Mechanical Engineers' Henry R. Worthington Medal for achievement in the field of pumping.

He wrote over 1100 technical articles and papers on pump use and maintenance, as well as several books, including Centrifugal Pump Selection, Operation and Maintenance, Engineers' Guide to Centrifugal Pumps, and Centrifugal Pump Clinic; he also co-wrote Pump Questions and Answers, and co-edited Pump Handbook.

In 1996, the Thirteenth Pump Users Symposium was dedicated to his memory.
