= Monika Karas =

Hungarian journalist

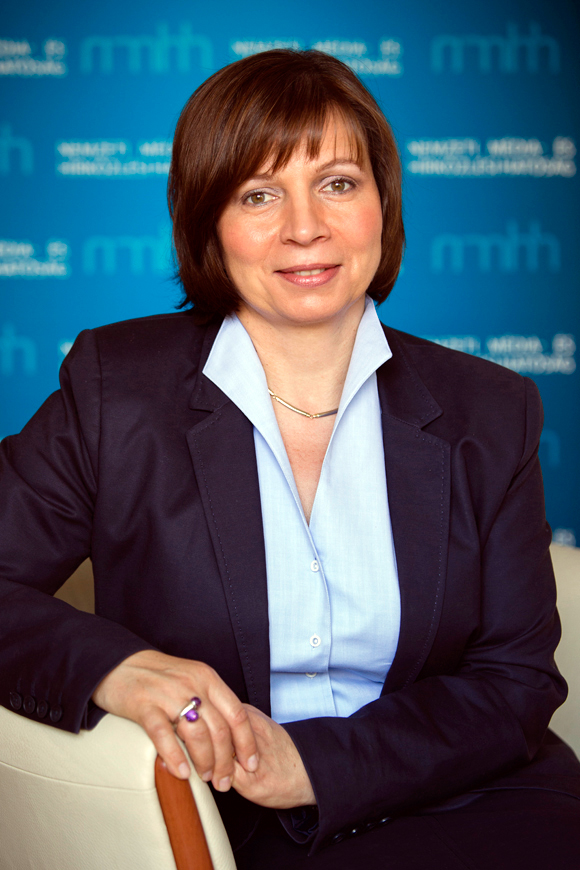

President of the National Media and Infocommunications Authority
- In office 19 August 2013 – 31 October 2021
- Preceded by: Annamária Szalai
- Succeeded by: András Koltay

Personal details
- Born: 1960s
- Children: 2
- Profession: jurist, journalist

Dr. Monika Karas (born 1960s) is a Hungarian journalist and jurist who served as President of the National Media and Infocommunications Authority (NMHH) from 19 August 2013 to 31 October 2021.

Before her appointment, she was known as a defense lawyer for Magyar Nemzet, Lánchíd Rádió and Hír TV, Szárhegy-dűlő-Sárazsadány-Tokajhegyalja Kft. (the company in which Orbán Viktor and his wife had an interest), Árpád Habony, Antal Rogán, Magyar Fórum and Fidesz.

Karas announced her resignation on 15 October 2021, with the effect on 31 October, citing finding new challenges. Media independent of government assessed the decision as a political machination, as the National Assembly with the pro-government two-third majority of Fidesz is able to elect her successor for nine years before the 2022 parliamentary election.
