= Lauingen =

- Town
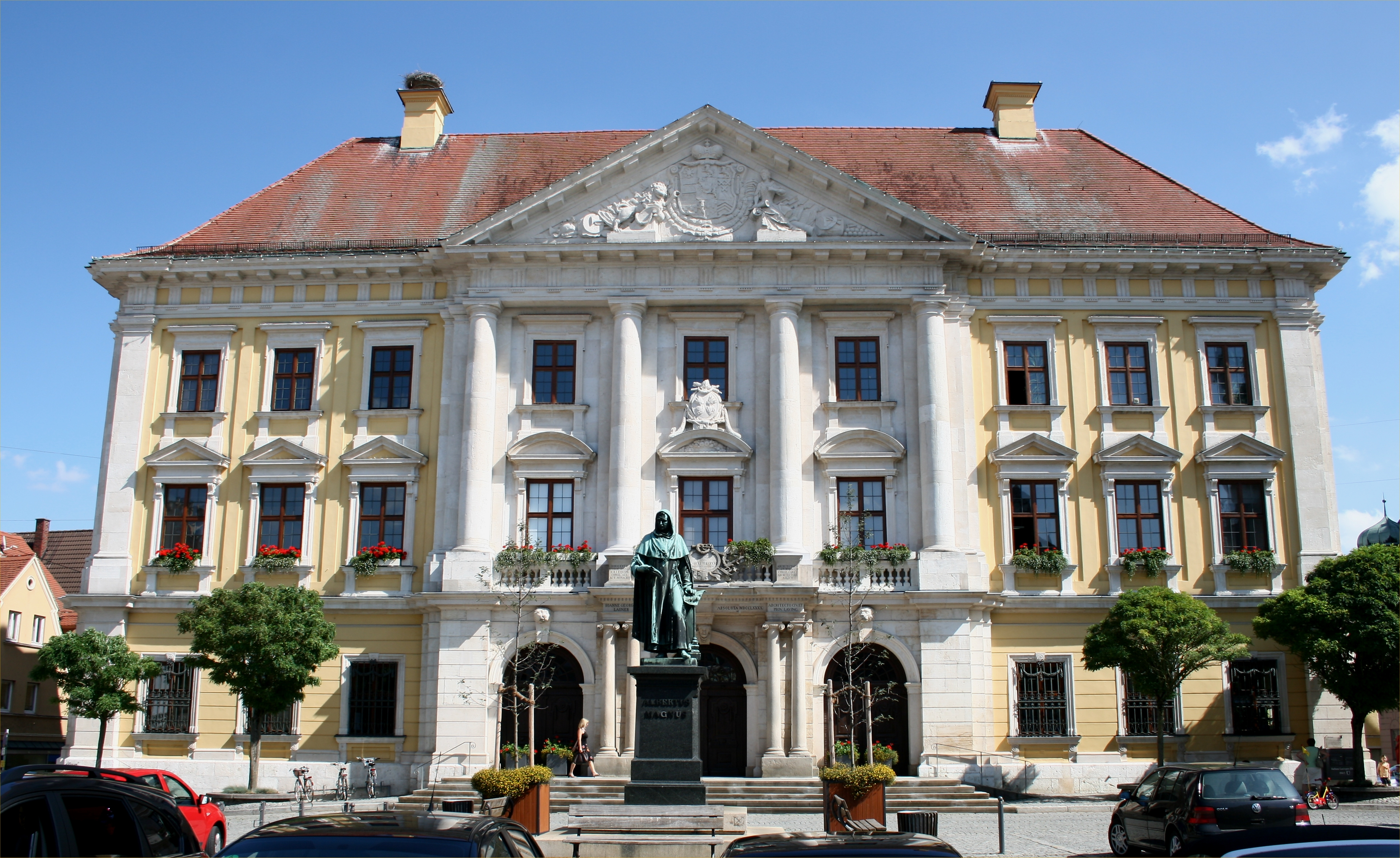
- The town hall

- Coat of arms

- Location of Lauingen within Dillingen district
- Interactive map of Lauingen
- Location within Germany Location within Bavaria
- Coordinates: 48°34′N 10°26′E
- Country: Germany
- State: Bavaria
- Admin. region: Schwaben
- District: Dillingen

Government
  - Mayor (2018–24): Katja Müller (CSU)

Area
  - Total: 44.39 km^{2} (17.14 sq mi)
- Elevation: 439 m (1,440 ft)

Population (2025-12-31)
  - Total: 11,604
  - Density: 261.4/km^{2} (677.0/sq mi)
- Time zone: UTC+01:00 (CET)
  - Summer (DST): UTC+02:00 (CEST)
- Postal codes: 89415
- Dialling codes: 09072
- Vehicle registration: DLG
- Website: www.Lauingen.de

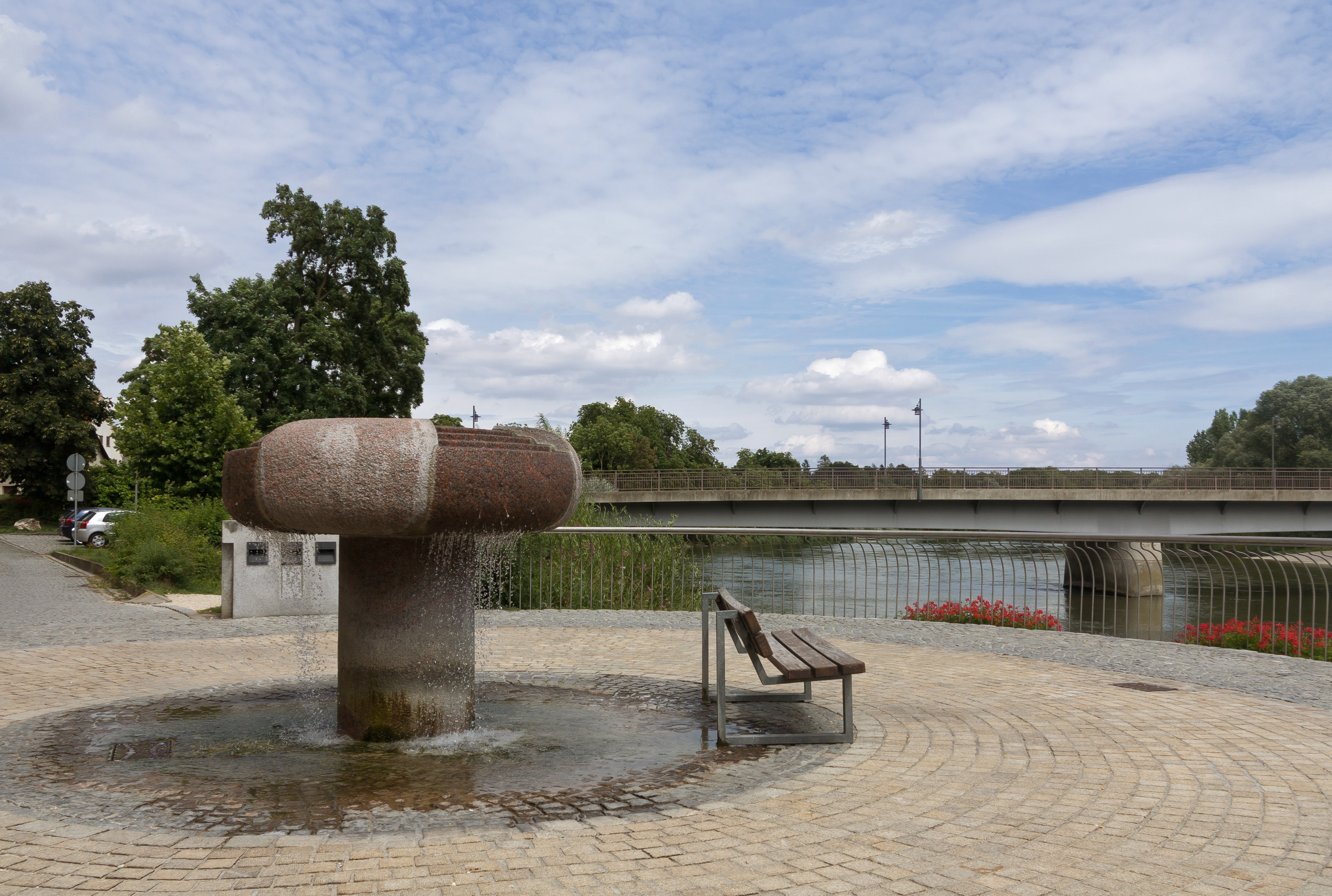
Sculpture with bridge across the Danube

Lauingen (German pronunciation: [ˈlaʊɪŋən]; Swabian: Lauinga) is a town in the district of Dillingen in Bavaria, Germany. It is located on the left bank of the Danube, 5 km west of Dillingen, and 37 km northeast of Ulm.

In June 1800, the armies of the French First Republic, under command of Jean Victor Moreau, fought Habsburg regulars and Württemberg contingents, under the general command of Pál Kray. Kray had taken refuge in the fortress at Ulm; Moreau diverted his army to approach Ulm from the east. Kray had ordered preparation for the destruction of all the bridges across the Danube, including the one at Lauingen. A small group of French captured a foothold on the northern bank of the Danube by Grensheim, and Moreau's forces were able to move against the fortress on both sides of the river. At this battle, the culmination of the Danube Campaign of 1800, Moreau forced Kray to abandon Ulm and withdraw into eastern Bavaria.

== Notable people ==
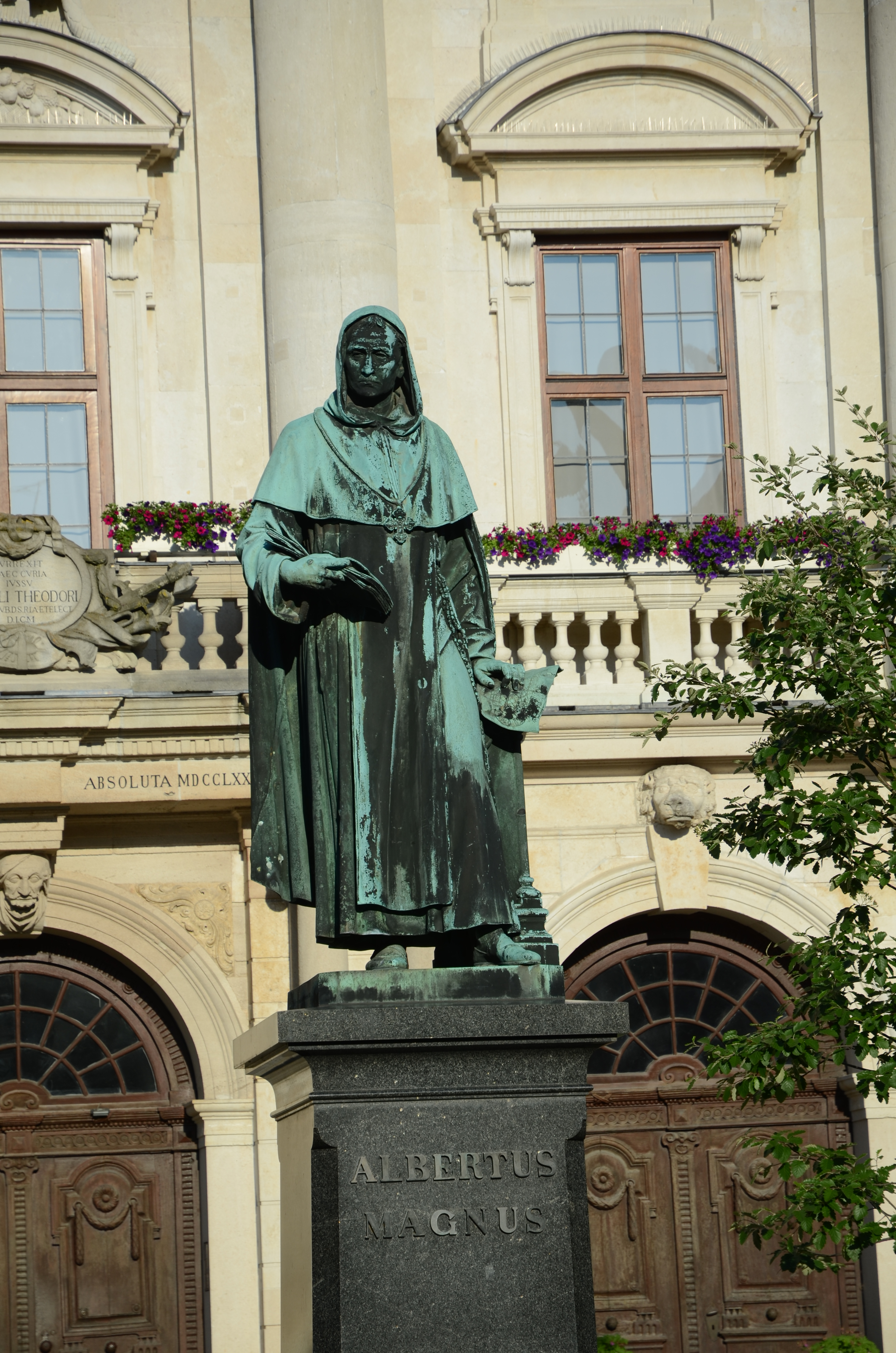
Lauingen Albertus Magnus memorial in front of the town hall

- Albertus Magnus (around 1200-1280), Dominican, bishop, Saint and important Aristotelian scholar
- Martin Ruland the Younger (1569-1611), physician and alchemist
- Nikolaus Geiger (1849-1897), painter and sculptor
- Heinz Piontek (1925-2003), writer and Büchner Prize winner lived from 1947 to 1955 in Lauingen

== International relations ==
Lauingen is twinned with:

- Marzahn-Hellersdorf, Berlin, Germany
- Segré, France
- Treviglio, Italy

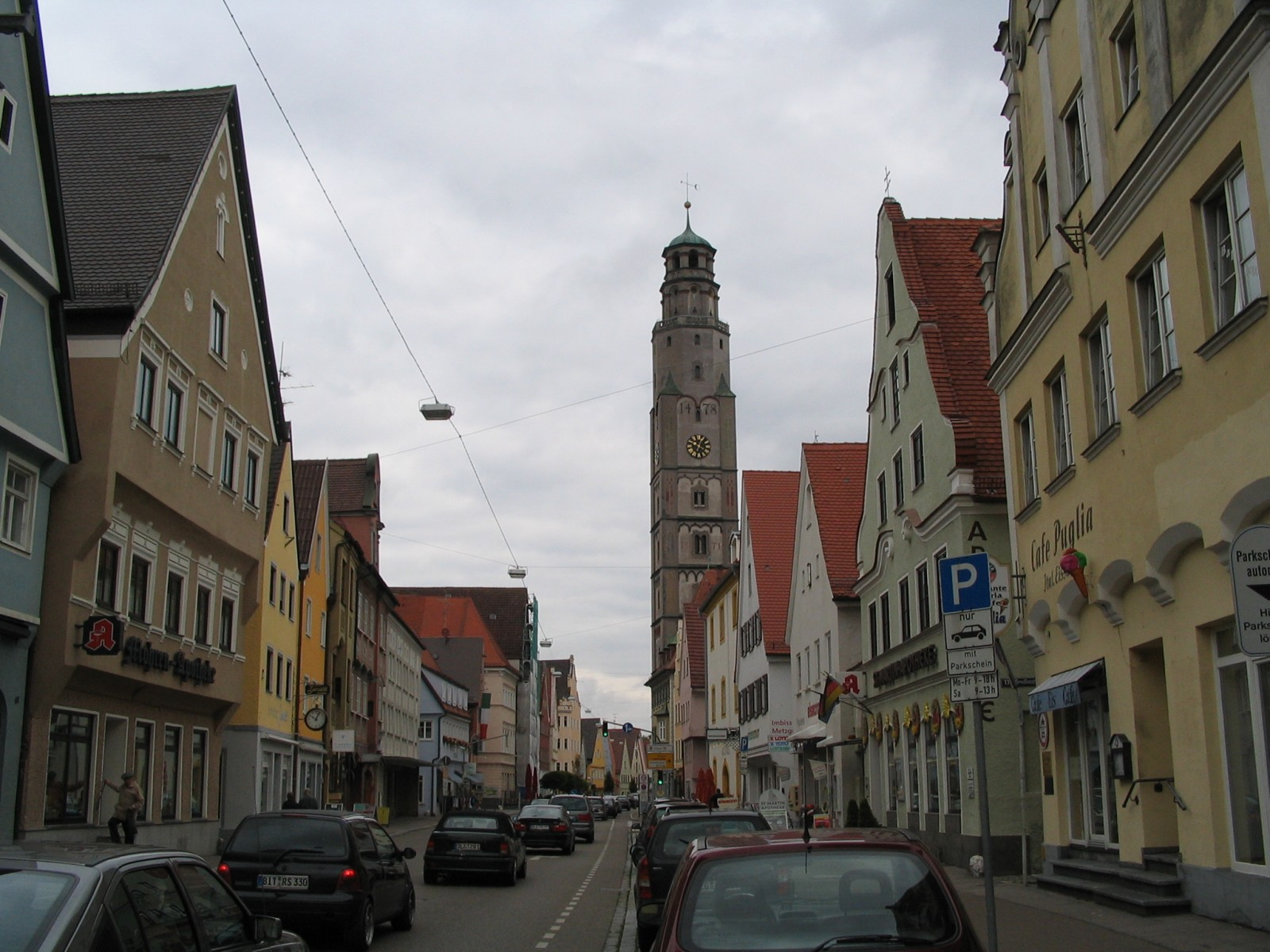
View of the town

== See also ==
- Shoes on the Danube Bank
