= Bruder (toy manufacturer) =

German toy manufacturer

Bruder Spielwaren GmbH + Co. KG
- Type: GmbH + Co. KG
- Industry: Toy manufacturing
- Founded: 1926
- Founder: Paul Bruder
- Headquarters: Bernbacher Str. 94-98, 90768, Fürth, Germany
- Products: Toys
- Website: www.brudertoys.com

Bruder Spielwaren is a German toy manufacturer based in Fürth. Founded by Paul Bruder in 1926 as a manufacturer of toy components, the family-owned company is considered one of Europe's leading manufacturers of 1:16 scale model toys.

== History ==
The company was founded in 1926 by Paul Bruder and initially made brass reeds for toy trumpets. Paul's son Heinz Bruder joined the company in 1950 and production of small plastic toys began in 1958. Paul Heinz Bruder (son of Heinz Bruder) then joined in 1987, assuming responsibility for product development and production, after which the company underwent a period of extensive expansion. The company exports 70% of its production to over 60 countries, with sales reaching €75 million in 2014 and is one of the few that still manufactures its toys in Germany.

== Product lines and counterfeits ==
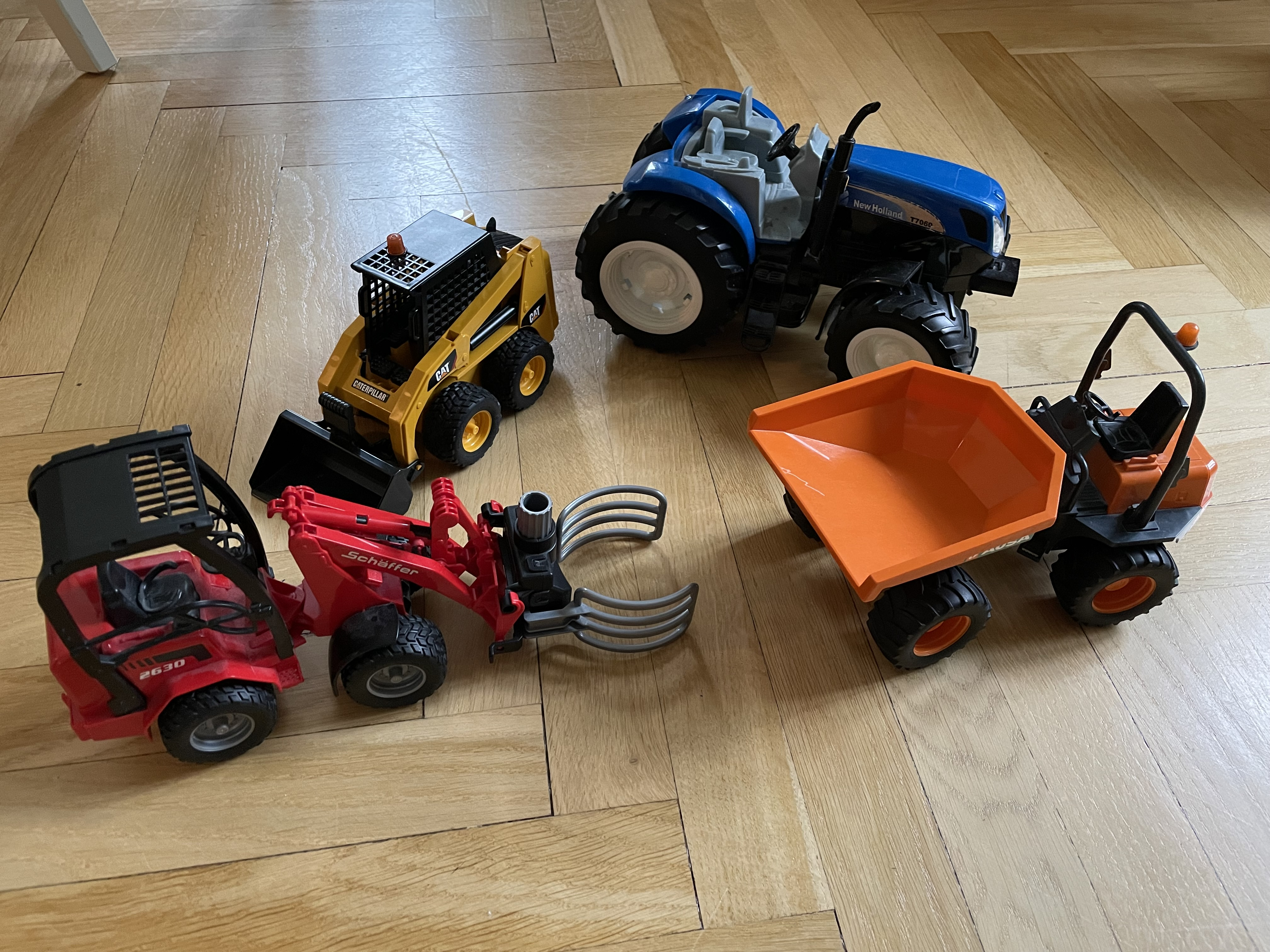
Different machines from Bruder

Bruder has two main product lines – the Professional series, which is their primary line, and a Roadmax series of toys with a simpler design for younger children. Their toys have been recommended by Spiel gut, a German government funded consumer advice committee.

The Professional series is centered around emergency services vehicles, and forestry, construction and agricultural machinery. All toys in this series are made to a 1:16 scale and feature vehicles and machinery from Caterpillar, Claas, JCB, Jeep, JLG, John Deere, Lamborghini, Land Rover, Liebherr, Mack, MAN, Manitou, Mercedes-Benz, New Holland, SAME and Scania. Some vehicles feature the livery of companies such as DHL and United Parcel Service.

A line that was launched in 2011 is bworld, which stands for Bruder World. It is a line of figures, playsets, and accessories designed to be used with the Professional Series vehicles.

The company has had several of its designs counterfeited over the years, with some of the copies earning Plagiarius Awards in 2006, 2008, 2010, 2013, and 2014.
