= Hürlimann Tractors =

Swiss tractor manufacturer

Hürlimann
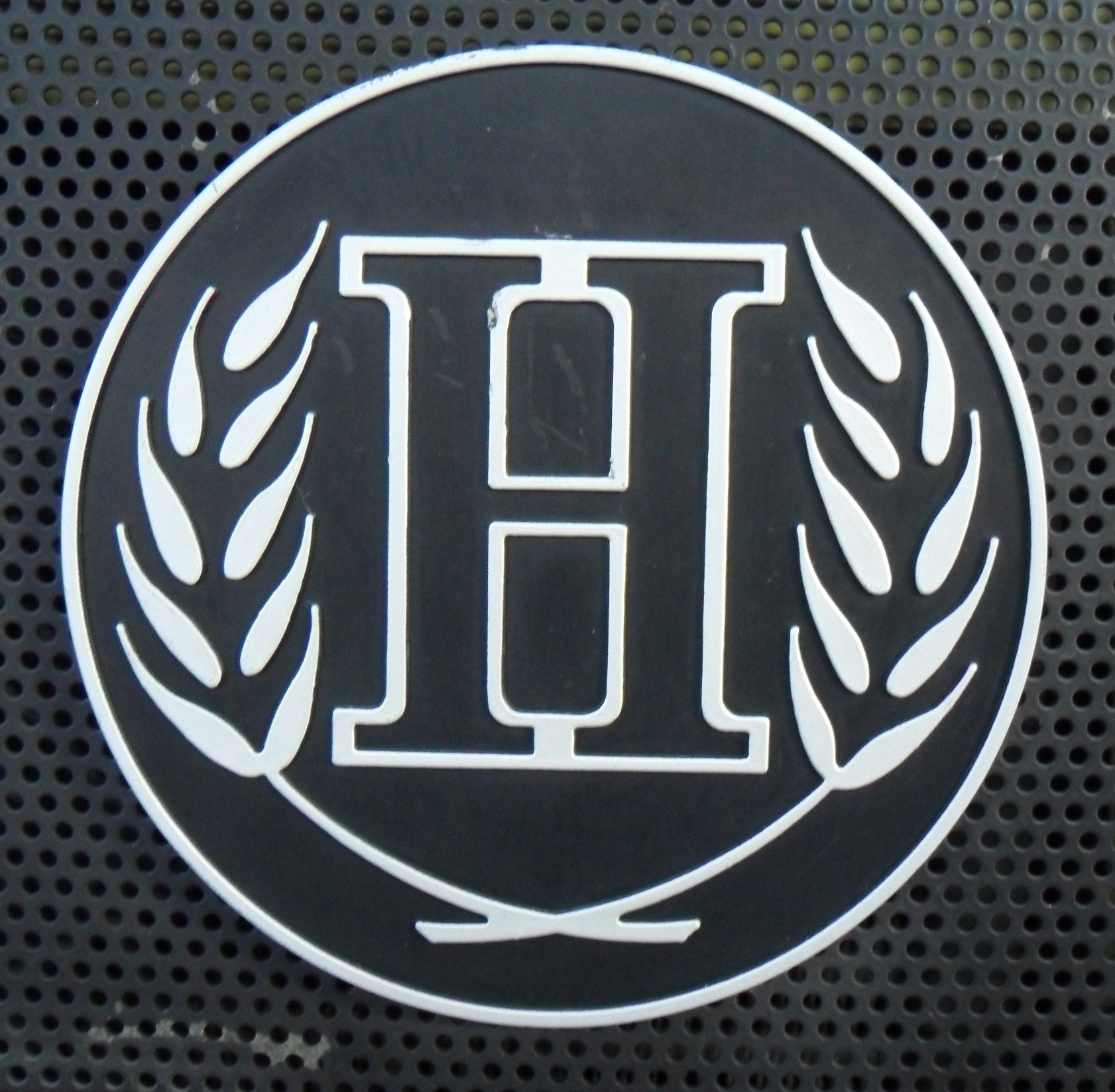

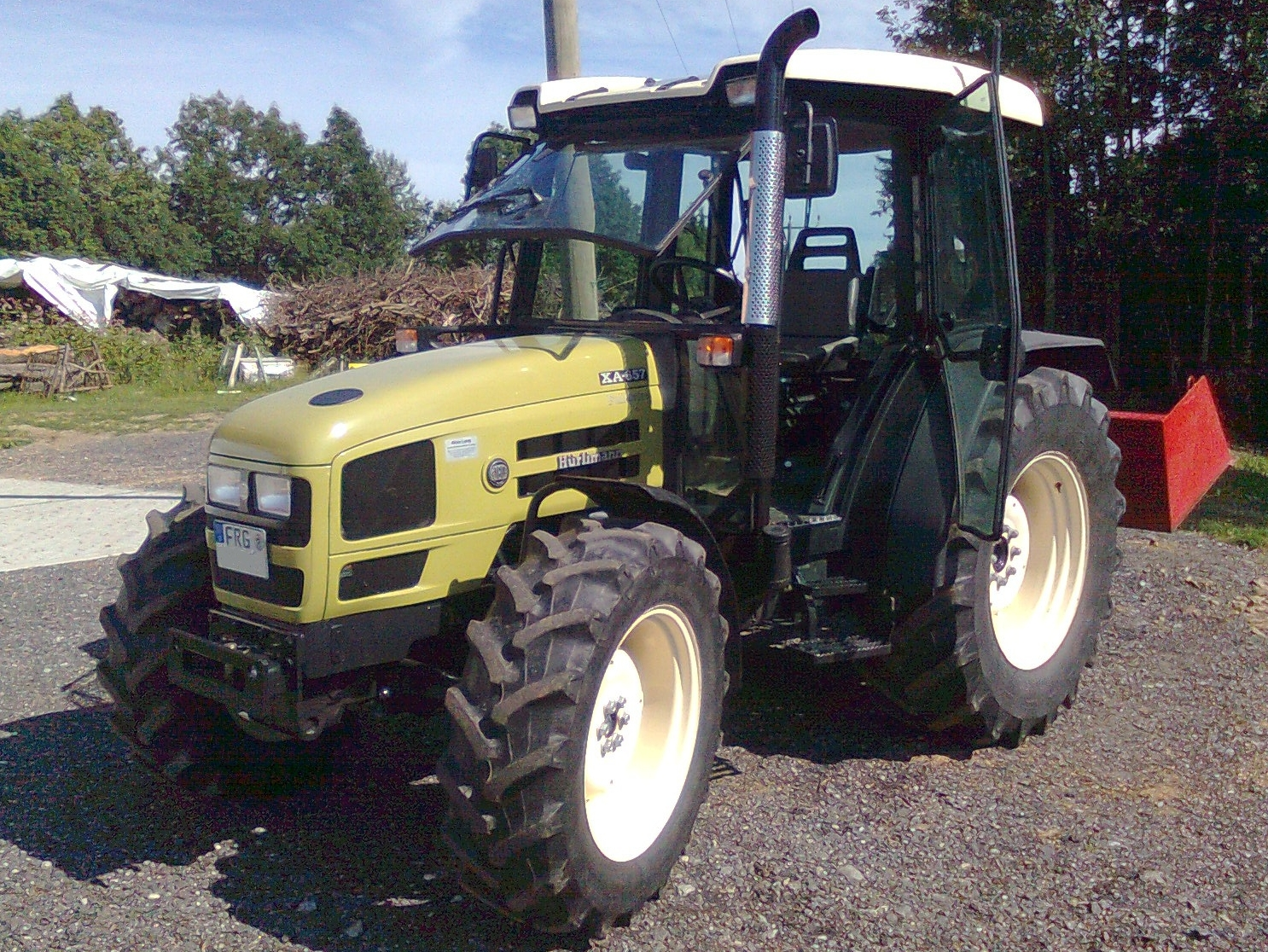
- Type: Public
- Industry: Agricultural machinery
- Founded: 1929
- Founder: Hans Hürlimann
- Headquarters: Treviglio, Italy
- Products: Tractors
- Parent: SDF Group
- Website: https://www.huerlimann-tractors.com/en-eu/

Hürlimann was originally a Swiss tractor manufacturer founded in Wil, Canton of St. Gallen.

== The early years ==
In 1929, company founder Hans Hürlimann developed the firm's first tractor: The Hürlimann 1K8, a petrol-powered machine with a 763cc Bernard single-piston engine producing 8hp, equipped with a mowing implement. A total of 416 units of this first model were produced.

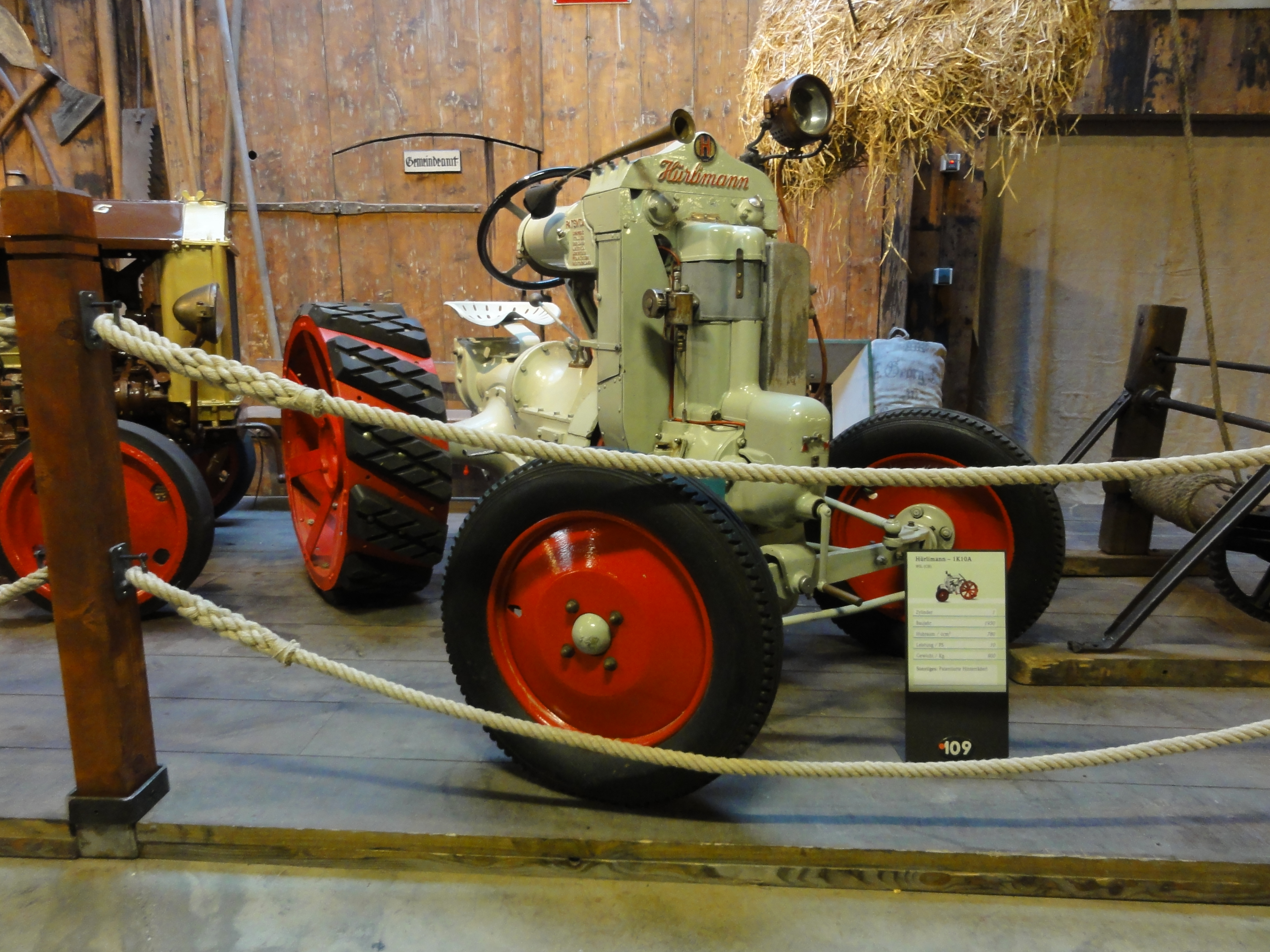
Hürlimann 1K10, Traktormuseum Bodensee, Uhldingen-Mühlhofen (Germany)

In 1930 he named his company Maison Hürlimann, and upgraded his original tractor with a more powerful engine, a 860cc Bernard engine producing 10hp and named it 1K10. This was sold in 367 units.

From 1931 Hürlimann started production of their first multi-cylinder unit with their 4T18Z, equipped with a 4-cylinder engine from Zürcher producing 18 hp.

In 1937 Maison Hürlimann built a new factory in the home town, Wil in Switzerland. The first 4-cylinder direct injection diesel engine tractor, the “4DT45”, is produced in 1939. This is a transition from which Hürlimann mainly focuses on diesel engines.

== Post–World War II Expansion ==
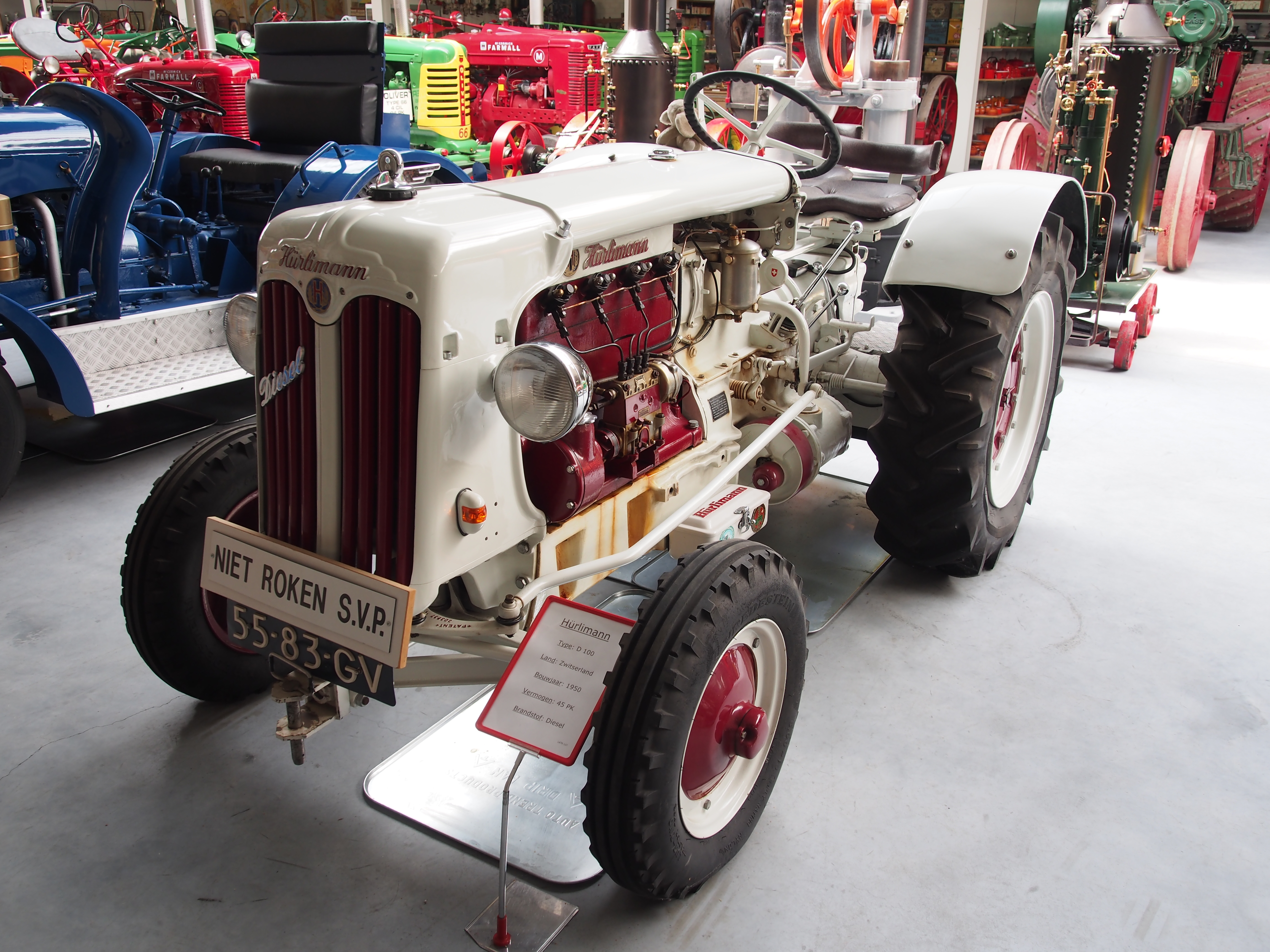
Hürlimann D100 photographed in the MUSEUM for NOSTALGIA and TECHNICS, Dorpsstraat 38, Langenboom, The Netherlands.

In 1946 Hürlimann introduced a new range featuring diesel engines designed in-house for the first time. The first new models were the 45-horsepower, 4-cylinder D100 and D200. Soon after followed the 65-horsepower D300 as well as industrial models D400 (45 hp) and D500 (65 hp), which could reach maximum speeds of 45 km/h. In 1948, the 2-cylinder D50 was introduced, producing 28 hp.

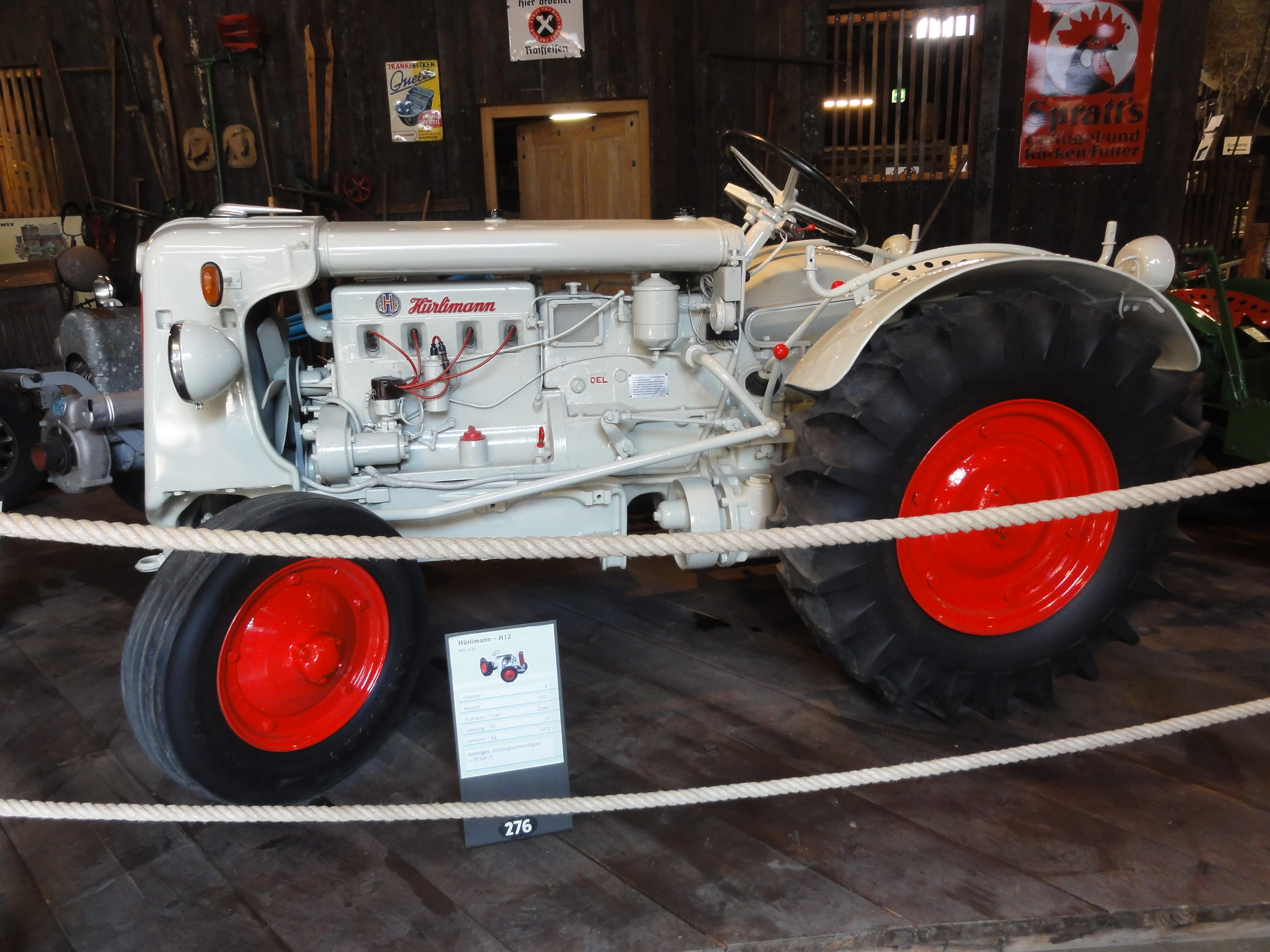
Hürlimann H12, Traktormuseum Bodensee, Uhldingen-Mühlhofen (Germany)

From 1950 to 1955 Hürlimann started production of petrol powered tractors again, with the production line of H10, H12, H17, H19 and H20. But from 1956 on they were all about diesel engines.

In the early 1950s Hürlimann began expanding into foreign markets. The D600, a 70 hp tractor was introduced in 1951, and gained particular popularity in South America.

The D50 was replaced in 1952 by models D60 and D80, which were lighter in construction than their predecessor but longer and equipped with a small 4-cylinder diesel engine producing 32hp.

From 1968 onward, Hürlimann tractors became available with 4×4 drive, using front axles supplied by ZF (Zahnradfabrik Friedrichshafen).

== Acquisition and Group Evolution ==
In 1979, Hürlimann was acquired by the Italian manufacturer SAME. Following SAME’s earlier purchase of Lamborghini Trattori in 1973, the combined group adopted the name SAME-Lamborghini-Hürlimann (S-L-H).

In 1995, the group acquired Deutz-Fahr from the German conglomerate Klöckner-Humboldt-Deutz AG (KHD) and the group changed to SAME Deutz-Fahr (SDF). SDF Group is the present name of the agricultural machinery manufacturer, with headquarters in Treviglio, Italy.

SDF Group today produces agricultural machinery under the brands SAME, Lamborghini, Hürlimann, Deutz-Fahr, Grégoire and Vitibot

== Further literature ==
- Gerold Röthlin: Hürlimann – Prospekte von 1929 bis 1983. Verlag Gerold Röthlin, Kriens 2008.
- Franz Morgenegg: Hürlimann. Fachpresse Goldach, Goldach 1994.
