= Hürlimann =

Hürlimann is a surname. Notable people with the surname include:

- Ernst Hürlimann (born 1934), Swiss rower who competed in the 1960 Summer Olympics
- Hans Hürlimann (1918–1994), Swiss politician and member of the Swiss Federal Council (1974–1982)
- Janet Hürlimann, Swiss curler and coach
- Manfred Hürlimann (born 1958), Swiss painter
- Martin Hürlimann (1897–1984), Swiss photographer
- Patrick Hürlimann (born 1963), Swiss curler and Olympic champion
- Robert Hürlimann (born 1967), Swiss curler
- Thomas Hürlimann (born 1950), Swiss playwright and novelist

== See also ==
- Hürlimann Brewery, former brewery in Zürich, Switzerland
- Hürlimann Tractors, Swiss tractor manufacturer
