= SDF Group =

Italian manufacturing company

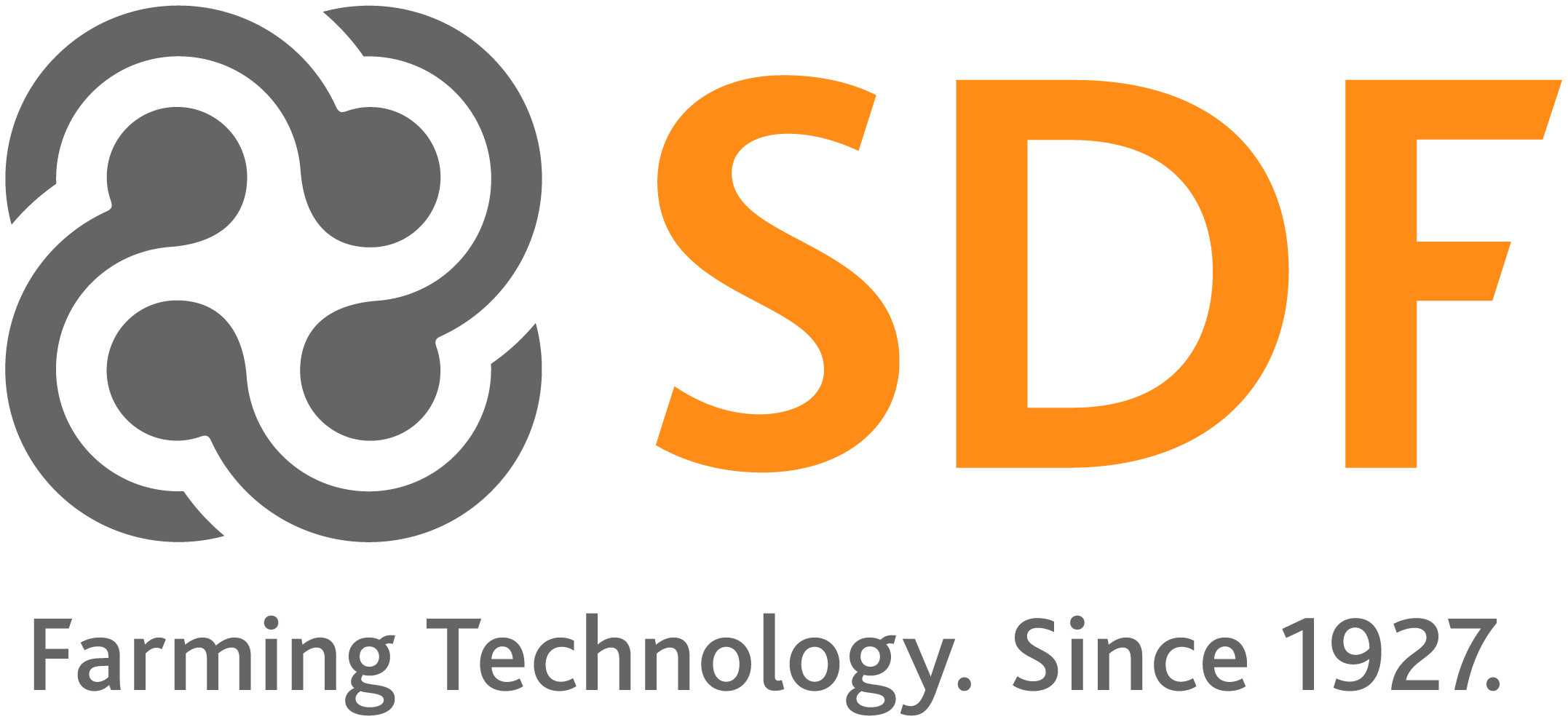
- Type: Public company
- Industry: Agricultural machinery
- Founded: 1927; 99 years ago
- Headquarters: Treviglio (Bergamo), Italy
- Key people: Vittorio Carozza – Chairman Lodovico Bussolati – CEO
- Products: Tractors; Combine harvesters Diesel engines
- Brands: SAME; Deutz-Fahr; Lamborghini Trattori; Hürlimann Tractors; Grégoire; VitiBot
- Revenue: € 1,803 millions (2022)
- Number of employees: 4,462 (2022)
- Website: www.sdfgroup.com

SDF Group is an Italian agricultural machinery manufacturer founded in 1927 and with its headquarters in Treviglio (Bergamo), Italy. SDF is one of the world's leading manufacturers of tractors, combine harvesters, and diesel engines. The group's products are commercialized under the brand names SAME, Deutz-Fahr, Lamborghini Trattori, Hürlimann, Grégoire and VitiBot. The tractors produced by the group cover a power range from 25 to 440 HP, while its combine harvesters cover a range of powers up to 395 HP.

== History of the group ==
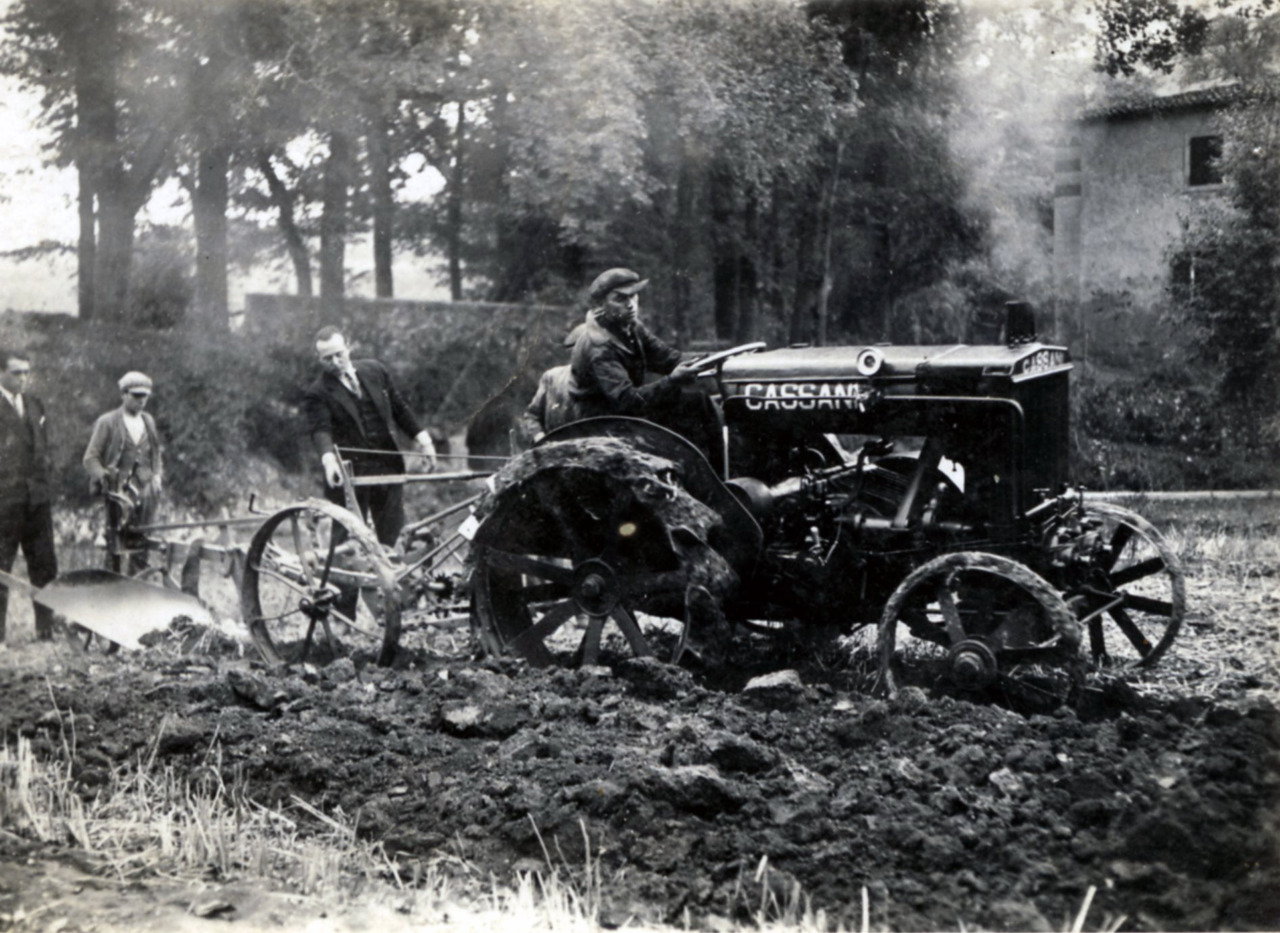
Cassani tractor in action (year 1929)

The history of the group dates back to 1927, with the creation of one of the first tractor powered by a diesel engine by brother Francesco and Eugenio Cassani. In 1942 the foundation of the company SAME (Società Accomandita Motori Endotermici) in Treviglio (Bergamo) crowned the company's founders' dream. After buying Lamborghini Trattori S.p.A. in 1973 from its founder Ferruccio Lamborghini, SAME embarked on a strategy of growth through acquisitions. With its acquisition of Hürlimann in 1979, the company changed its name to SAME-Lamborghini-Hürlimann (S-L-H).

In 1995, the group acquired Deutz-Fahr from the German group KHD, changing name definitively to SAME Deutz-Fahr (SDF).

SAME Deutz-Fahr India was founded in 1996.From 2003 to 2012, SDF was a shareholder in the German group Deutz AG. In 2003, the group acquired 10% of the Finland based company Sampo-Rosenlew, which specialised in the production of components and 4 and 5 straw walker combine harvesters. This shareholding was subsequently sold.

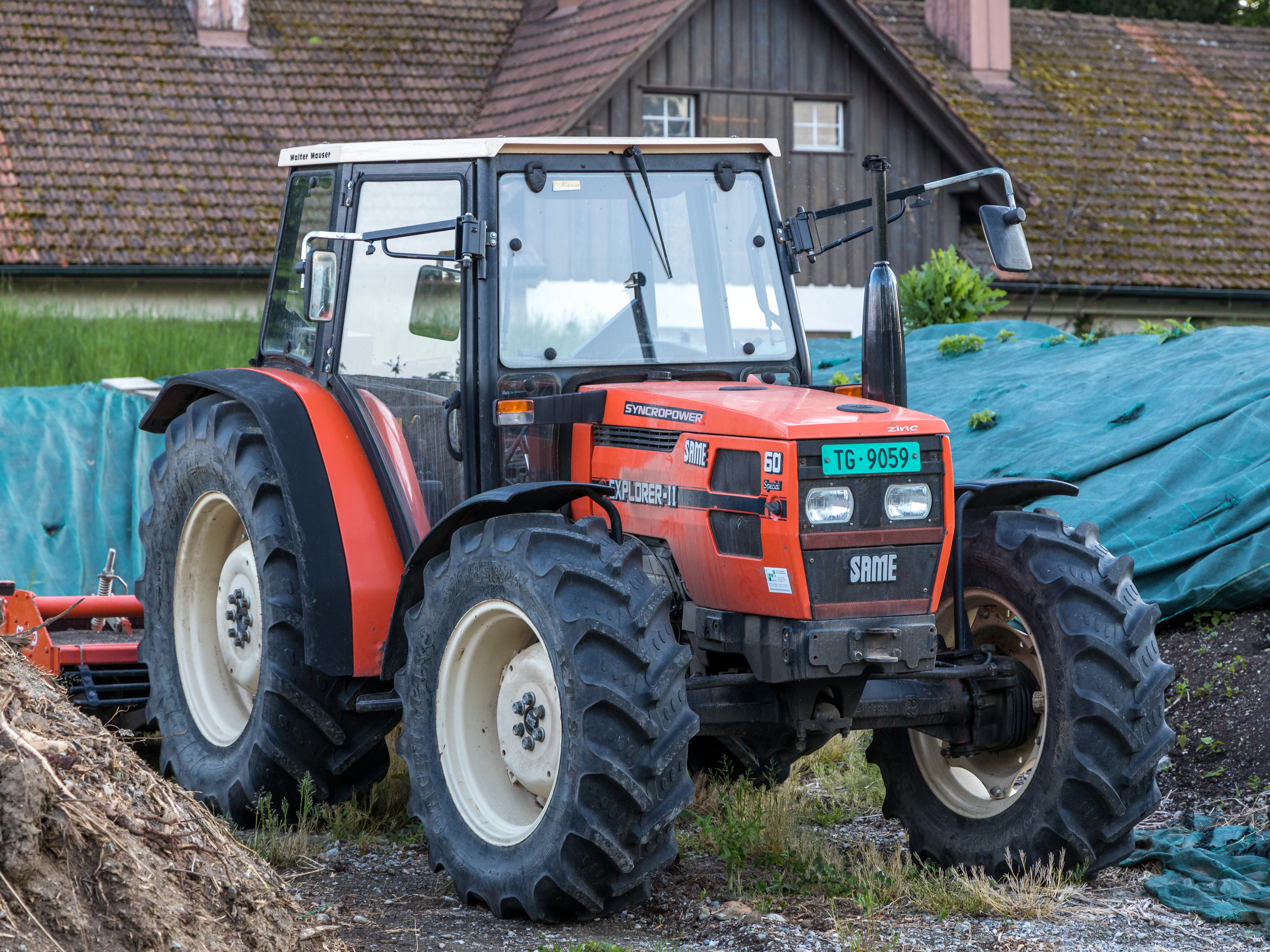
SAME Explorer-II 60

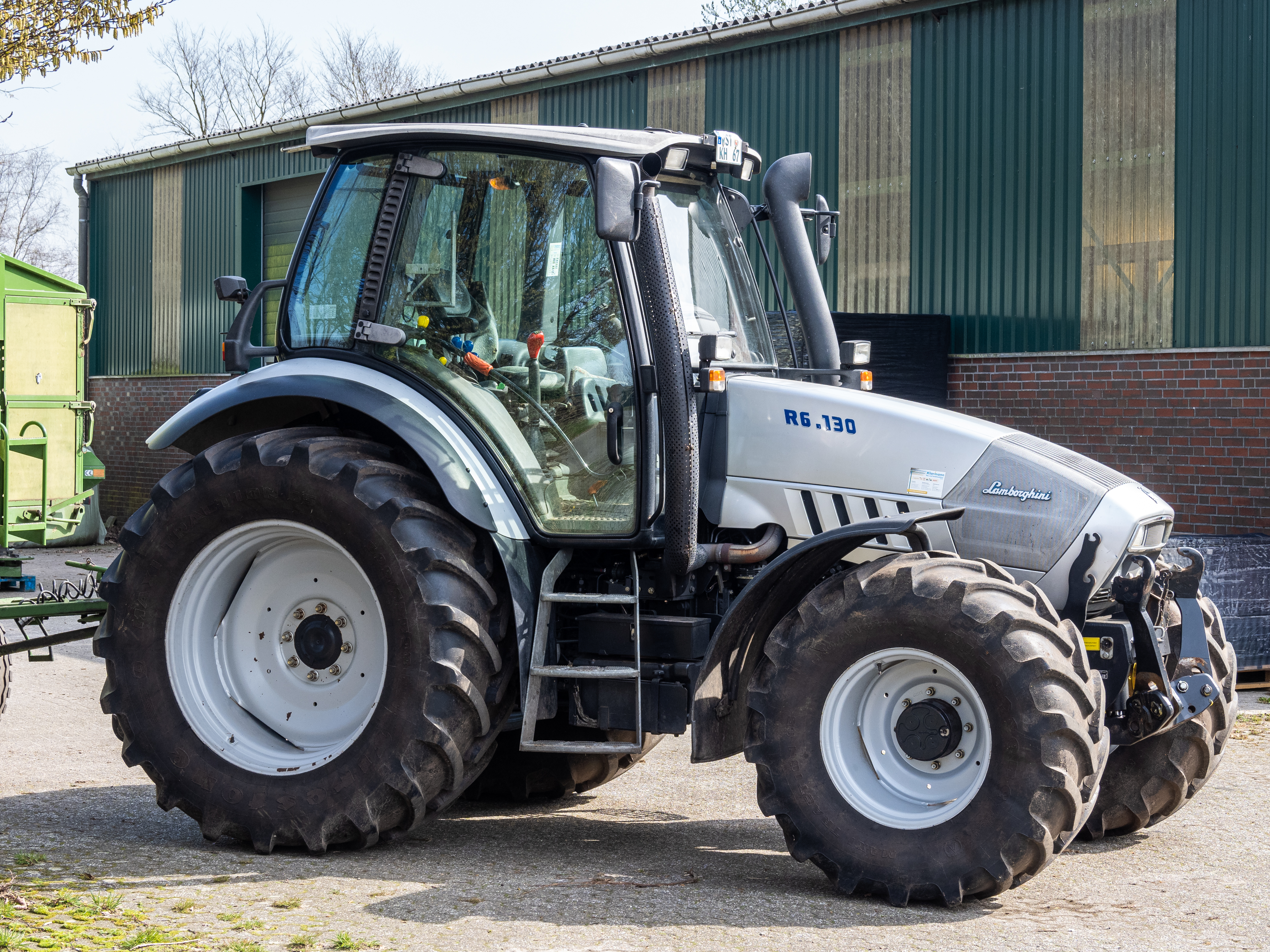
Lamborghini R6.130

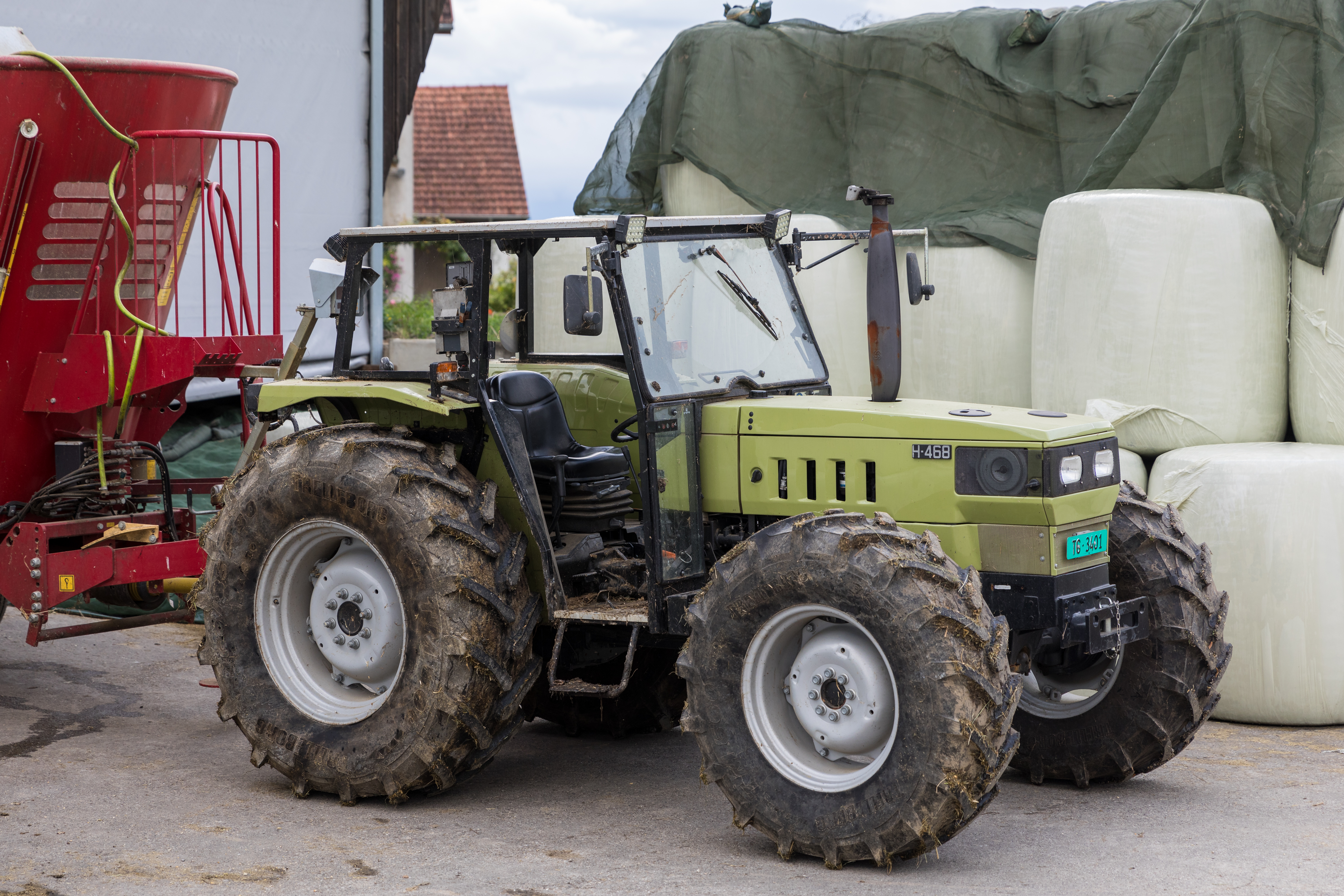
Hürlimann H-468

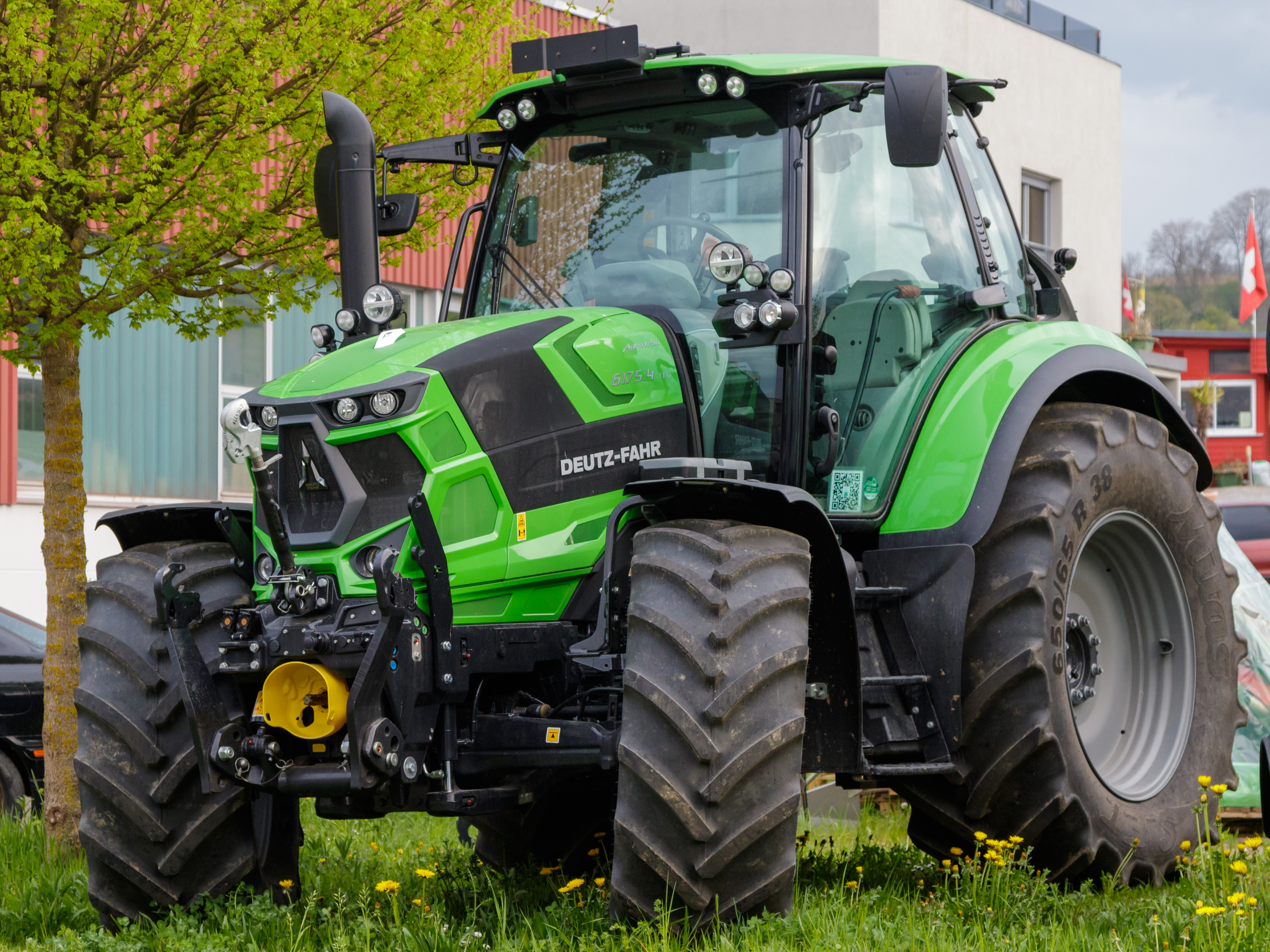
Deutz-Fahr Agrotron

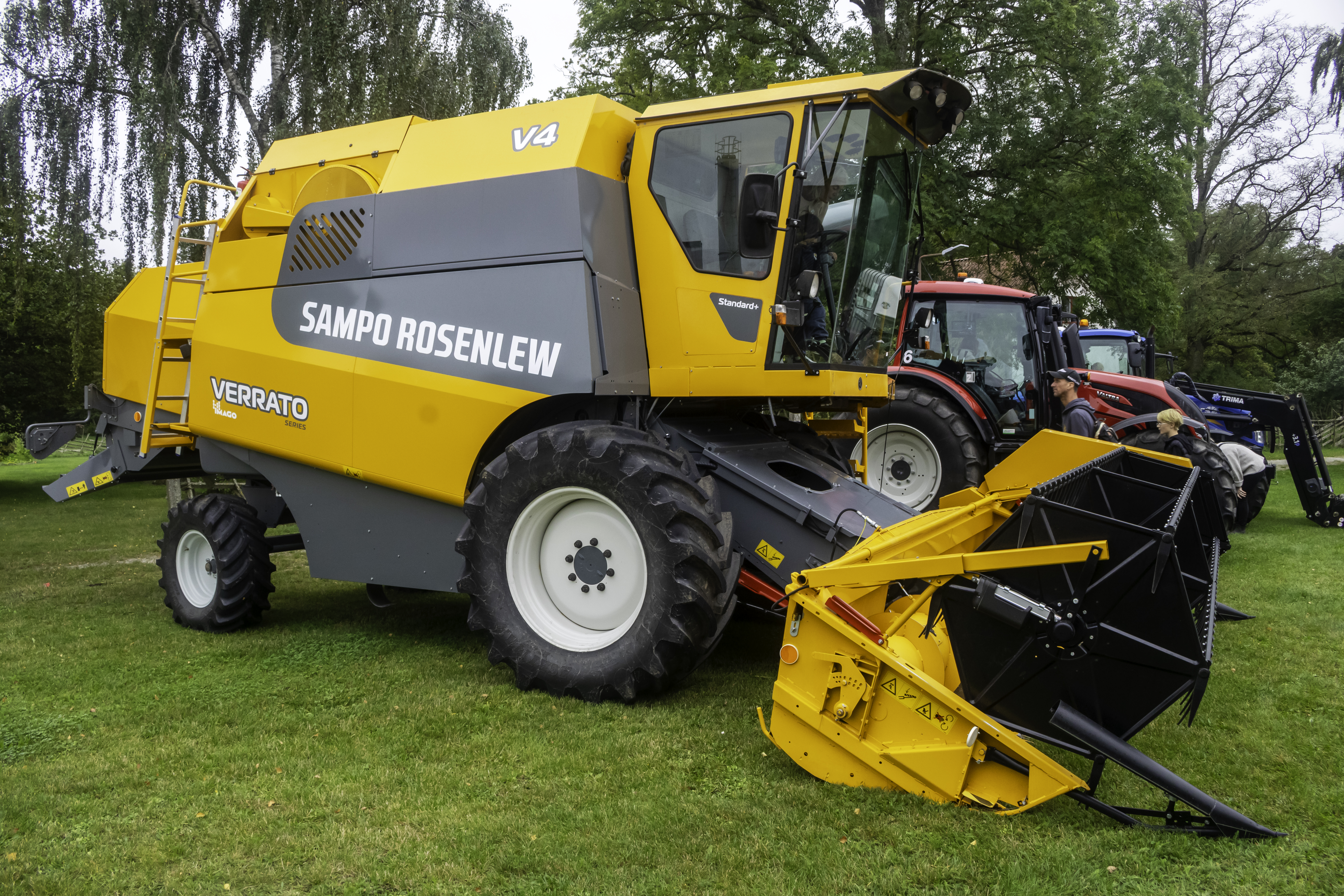
Sampo Rosenlew Verrato

In 2005, following its acquisition of the Croatia based company Ðuro Ðaković, the group founded the company Deutz-Fahr Combines, through which it now produces Deutz-Fahr branded components and combine harvesters.

In 2008, the SAME Deutz-Fahr Historical Archives and Museum was established at the group's main headquarters in Treviglio.

In 2011, the group acquired Grégoire A/S, a company which specialised in equipment for wine farming, olive oil farming, pruning and for the treatment and harvesting of grapes and olives. Also in 2011, SDF initiated a joint venture in China with Shandong Changlin Machinery.

In 2014, the company SAME Deutz-Fahr Traktör Sanayi ve Ticaret A.Ş. was founded in Istanbul, Turkey and the company Agricoltural Equipment in China is acquired and in 2016 SDF acquires the majority of the Chinese business.

In 2022, SDF acquires VitiBot, French leader in the production of autonomous and electric robots for vineyards.

In February 2025, a partnership was announced with AGCO Corporation to have SDF produce tractors up to 85 hp under the Massey Ferguson brand for distribution into the global markeplace.

== Global operations ==
SDF has 9 production sites, 12 commercial branches, 1 joint venture in China, 155 importers, over 3,100 dealers, and 4,400 employees.

SDF's farm equipment, machinery, and logistics research and development is funded by a €50 million European Investment Bank loan secured by the European Fund for Strategic Investments. The initiative is part of Horizon 2020 and is in accordance with the Paris Agreement's objectives. A senior engineer at the European Investment Bank, Matteo Fusari, who worked on the project, says, "We expect this project to have quite a good environmental impact." “It allows for vehicle automation and monitoring from a distance. These innovations will increase the efficiency of bioeconomy supply chains, in addition to reducing fuel consumption and CO2 emissions.”

Production plants

- Treviglio (Italy): mid and mid-high power tractors from 70 to 170 HP
- Lauingen (Germany): mid and mid-high power tractors from 130 HP
- Županja (Croatia): combines and harvesting machines
- Ranipet (India): low and low-mid power tractors up to 110 HP, diesel engines from 30 to 170 HP.
- Châteaubernard (France): machines for grape and olive harvesting, towed and self-propelled
- Bandirma (Turkey): mid-power tractors from up to 130 HP
- Linshu (China): tractors up to 280 HP, combines and harvesting machines, from 32 to 140 HP
- Suihua (China): tractors with 210 HP

== Awards ==
Tractors produced by the SDF group have earned numerous awards and accolades over the years. These include:

Year	Products	Award	Country
2013	Deutz-Fahr 7250 TTV Agrotron	Red Dot Product Design Award	Germany
2013	Deutz-Fahr 7250 TTV Agrotron	Tractor of the year and Golden Tractor for the Design	Italy
2014	Deutz-Fahr 7250 TTV Agrotron	Compasso d'Oro	Italy
2014	Lamborghini Nitro	Red Dot Product Design Award	Germany
2014	Lamborghini Nitro 130 VRT	Golden Tractor for the Design	Germany
2015	Deutz-Fahr Driver Extended Eyes	Agritechnica Innovation Award	Germany
2016	SAME Frutteto ActiveDrive	Tractor of the Year: best of specialised	Germany
2016	Deutz-Fahr Serie 6 Cshift	Maschine des Jahres	Germany
2017	Deutz-Fahr 6215 RCshift	Tractor of the Year: Best Design	Italy
2017	SAME Frutteto ActiveDrive	Machine of the Year 2017	France
2019	Deutz-Fahr Agrolux 55 4WD	Indian Tractor of the Year 2019 - Best 4WD tractor of the Year	India
2019	Deutz-Fahr Agrolux Profiline 80	Indian Tractor of the Year 2019 - Best tractor above 60HP	India
2019	Deutz-Fahr Agromaxx 4060E	Farm Power Awards 2019 - Latest Innovation of the Year	India
2020	Deutz-Fahr Agromaxx 4050E	Farm Power Awards 2020 - Best Tractor of the Year 41-50HP	India

== Brands ==
- SAME
- Deutz-Fahr
- Lamborghini Trattori
- Hürlimann
- Grégoire
- VitiBot
