= Lamborghini Trattori =

Italian tractor manufacturer

- Type: Public
- Industry: Agricultural machinery
- Founded: 1948; 78 years ago
- Founder: Ferruccio Lamborghini
- Headquarters: Pieve di Cento, Italy
- Key people: Ferruccio Lamborghini (founder)
- Products: Tractors
- Parent: SDF Group
- Website: lamborghini-tractors.com

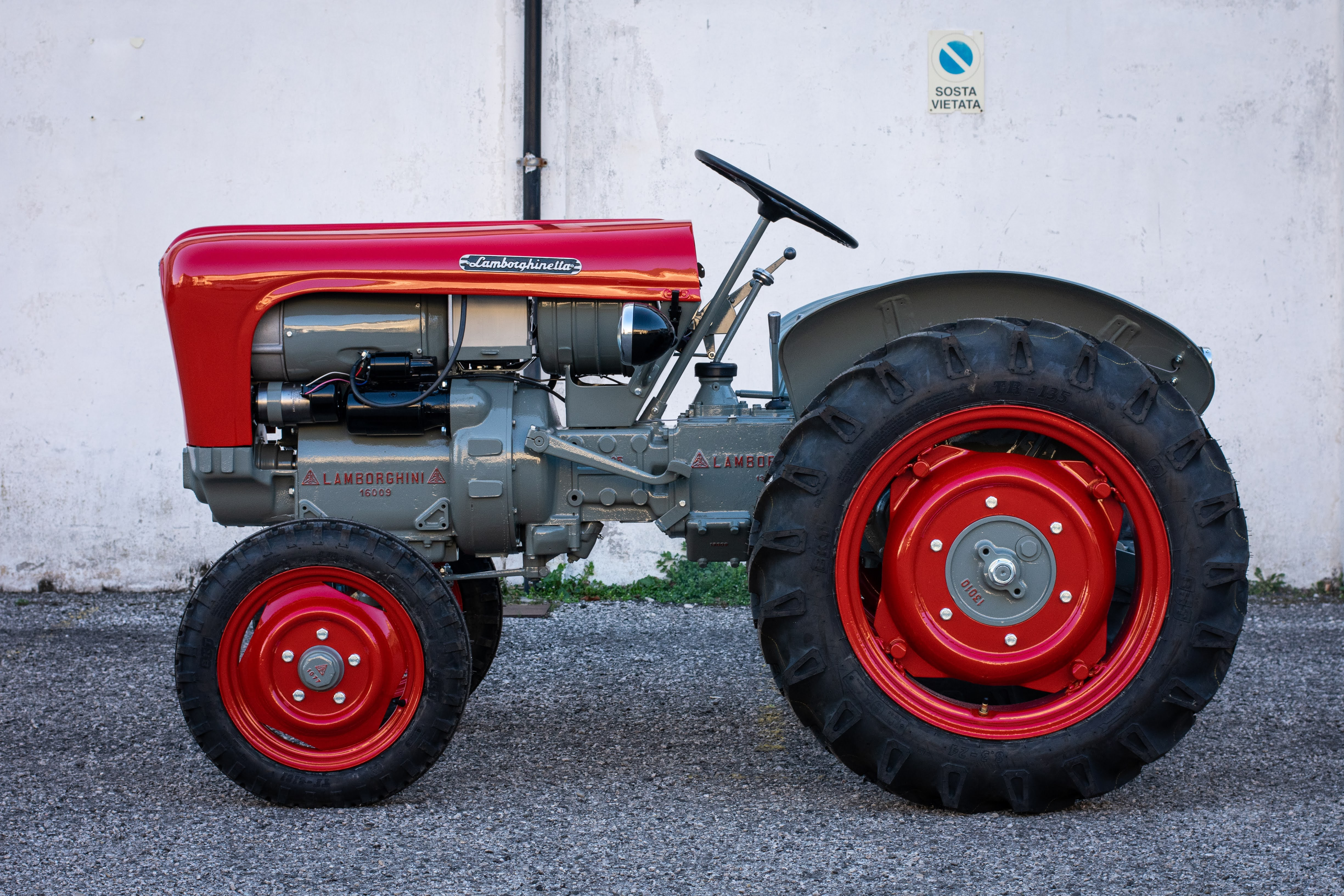
The 22 hp Lamborghinetta utility tractor was introduced in 1957.

Lamborghini Trattori is an Italian agricultural machinery manufacturer. The company designs and builds tractors. It was founded in 1948 in Cento, Italy, by Ferruccio Lamborghini, who later went on to establish Automobili Lamborghini. In 1973, it became part of SAME (Società Accomandita Motori Endotermici).

== History ==
Founded in 1948 by Ferruccio Lamborghini, Lamborghini Trattori did not have a long tradition like the historical names Fiat Trattori and Landini; in fact, it had to use discarded war materials to produce its first tractors.

Truck and military vehicle engines and differentials sourced from ARAR centres (Azienda Rilievo Alienazione Residuati) were used to build the first "Carioca" tractors. These machines featured a significant innovative technical solution – a fuel atomiser which, when used in conjunction with a Morris engine, allowed the tractor to be started with petrol and then switch to diesel.

Within a few years, company production had gone from one tractor a week to about 200 a year, and new Italian-made engines were replacing the old war surplus.

In 1951, the "L 33" came into being – the first production tractor made entirely by Lamborghini, with the exception of the engine: a diesel-fuelled 3,500 cc in-line 6 cylinder Morris, equipped with the fuel atomiser patented by Ferruccio Lamborghini.

The enactment of the Fanfani law of 25 July 1952 (that set aside 125 billion lire – with an interest rate of 3% – over 5 years for farmers who purchased Italian-made agricultural machinery) helped the company make a further quality leap. In fact, it was in the first half of the 1950s that Lamborghini was transformed to all effects into an industrial affair.

In 1952, the new models DL 15, DL 20, DL 25 and DL 30 were presented, followed the next year by the DL 40 and DL 50. The first Lamborghini crawler, the DL 25 C, was introduced in 1955, followed by the DL 30 C in its characteristic yellow colour.

A new plant was opened in 1956; in 1957, in the wake of the SAME Sametto, the company introduced the Lamborghinetta (weighing 1000 kg, with a 22 HP two-cylinder engine, and sold at a price of around one million lire).

In 1962, with its "2R DT" model, Lamborghini produced a series of four-wheel-drive tractors with air-cooled engines.

Flush with cash from his success in tractors and air conditioners, and following an argument with Enzo Ferrari about a faulty clutch in his Ferrari 250 GT, Ferruccio Lamborghini decided to start building his own luxury cars and introduced the Lamborghini marque. The first model introduced was the 350 GTV in 1963, which evolved into the production version 350 GT in 1964 and then further with the 400GT 2+2 in 1966. The highly sought after Miura came in 1966, pushing Automobili Lamborghini into the world of super sports cars it is known for today.

Thanks to a notable increase in sales, in 1968–69 Lamborghini Trattori adopted a strategy aimed at improving both the technical quality of its tractors and the production volumes. Lamborghini tractors were the first in Italy to be fitted with a synchronised gearbox as standard, and the range was further extended with high-power models.

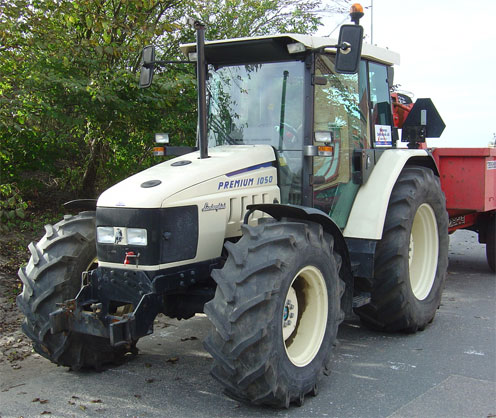
Lamborghini Premium 1050 (photo pre-2005)

At the beginning of the 21st century, the R6, R7 and R8 ranges entered production. In 2013, on the occasion of the international SIMA trade fair in Paris, the new Nitro tractor was presented to the market. It stood out for its white casing and totally renewed design. Thanks to Nitro, Lamborghini Trattori won a series of international awards, including Tractor of the Year – Golden Tractor for the Design 2014 and the RedDot Award 2014.

== See also ==
- SAME Deutz-Fahr
- SAME
- Hürlimann
- Deutz-Fahr
