= SAME (tractors) =

Italian agricultural machinery manufacturer

S.A.M.E.
- Type: Public company
- Industry: Agricultural machinery
- Founded: 1942; 84 years ago
- Founder: Francesco Cassani and Eugenio Cassani
- Headquarters: Treviglio, Italy
- Area served: Worldwide
- Products: Tractors; Front loaders
- Parent: SDF Group
- Website: www.same-tractors.com

S.A.M.E., an acronym for Società Accomandita Motori Endotermici, is an Italian agricultural machinery manufacturer. The company was founded in 1942 in Treviglio (Bergamo), Italy, by the brothers Francesco and Eugenio Cassani. SAME main products are tractors and front loaders. The company is now part of the SDF.

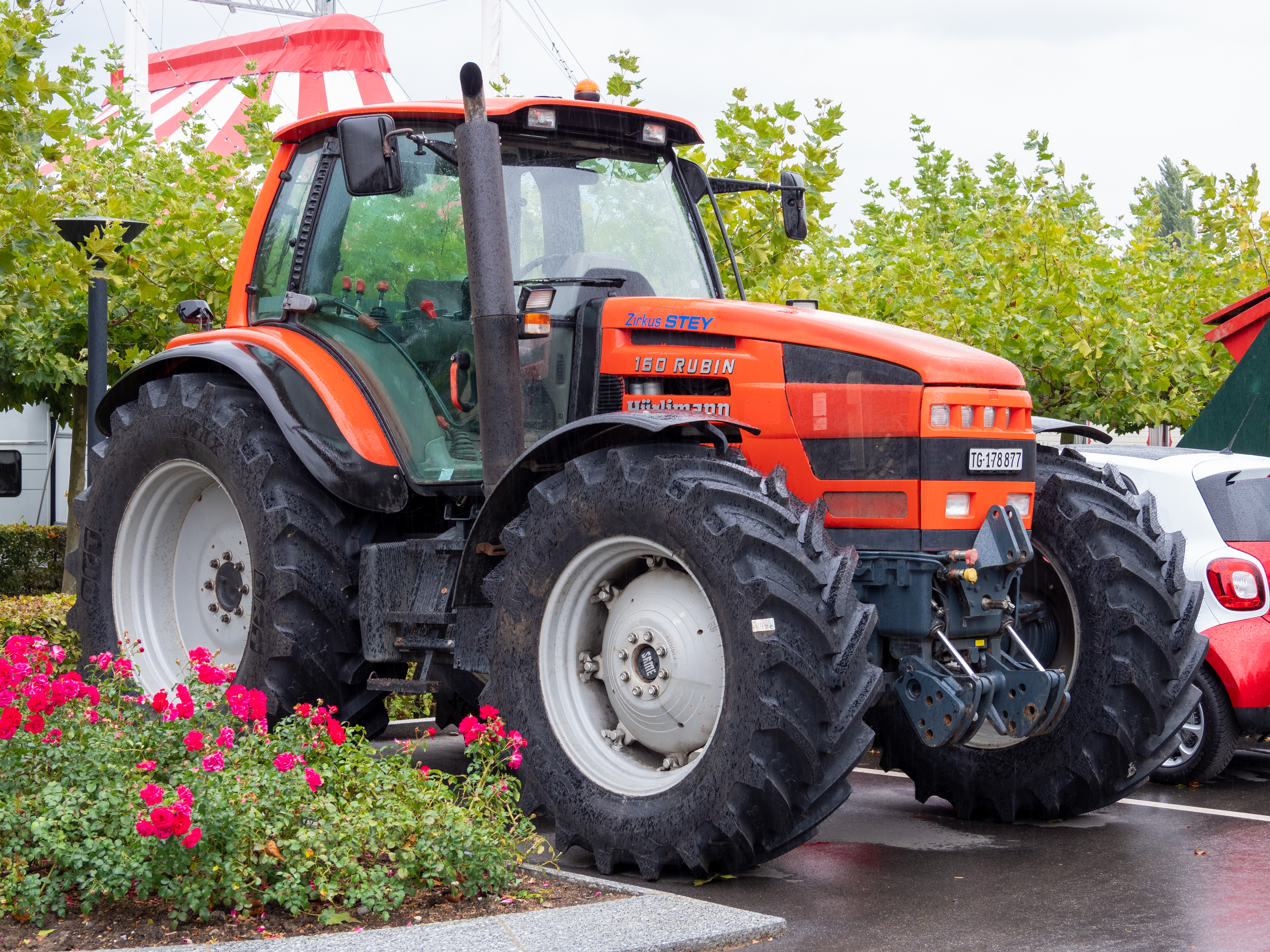
SAME Rubin 160

== History ==
=== From 1927 to post-WWII ===
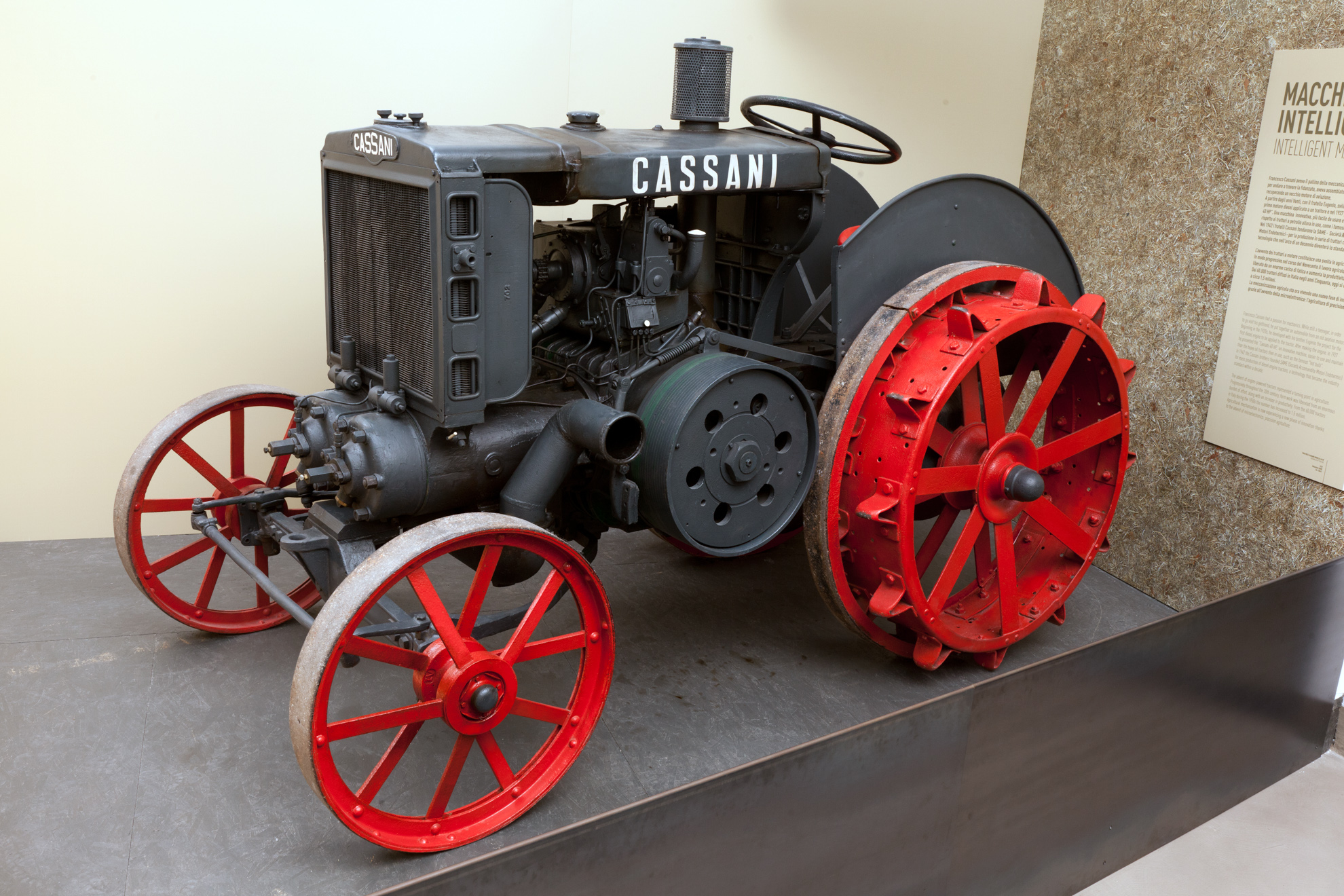
Tractor Cassani model 40HP, at the Museo nazionale della scienza e della tecnologia Leonardo da Vinci of Milan.

In 1927, the brothers Francesco and Eugenio Cassani designed and built the Cassani 40CV agricultural tractor. This was powered by a Diesel engine, a form of propulsion that had begun to be used in industrial, military and rail vehicle applications since the 1920s. The engine was a two stroke horizontal two-cylinder unit with a capacity of 12,723 cm^{3} producing forty horsepower at 550 rpm, with wick ignition, a compressed air starter system with pressurised air tank air, 4 speeds (3 FWD and 1 REV) and a top speed of 15 km/h. This tractor was sold at a price of 28,000 Lire. The tractor designed by Cassani was sold under license by Officine Gaetano Barbieri in Castelmaggiore.

Established in 1942, the newly formed company SAME initially manufactured petrol and diesel engines for civil and industrial applications such as winches, cranes, ploughs and fire-fighting pumps. In 1946, SAME introduced its first motor mower models, powered by an 8 HP petrol engine.

=== From post-WWII to the Italian economic boom ===
At the Milan Trade Fair in 1946, SAME presented its first 3-wheeled petrol-powered motor mower, which could also be attached to other agricultural machinery and implements. This was the company's first “universal tractor”, catering for the needs of the market in the years immediately following the Second World War.

The SAME 3R/10, a universal small tractor powered by a single cylinder 10 HP petrol engine, was presented in 1948. This machine had two driving wheels and a single steering wheel, variable track and reversible drive. The tractor was awarded the gold medal by the Turin Agricultural Academy. On 24 October 1948, the “Giornale dell’Agricoltura” described it as “a gem of Italian industry”.

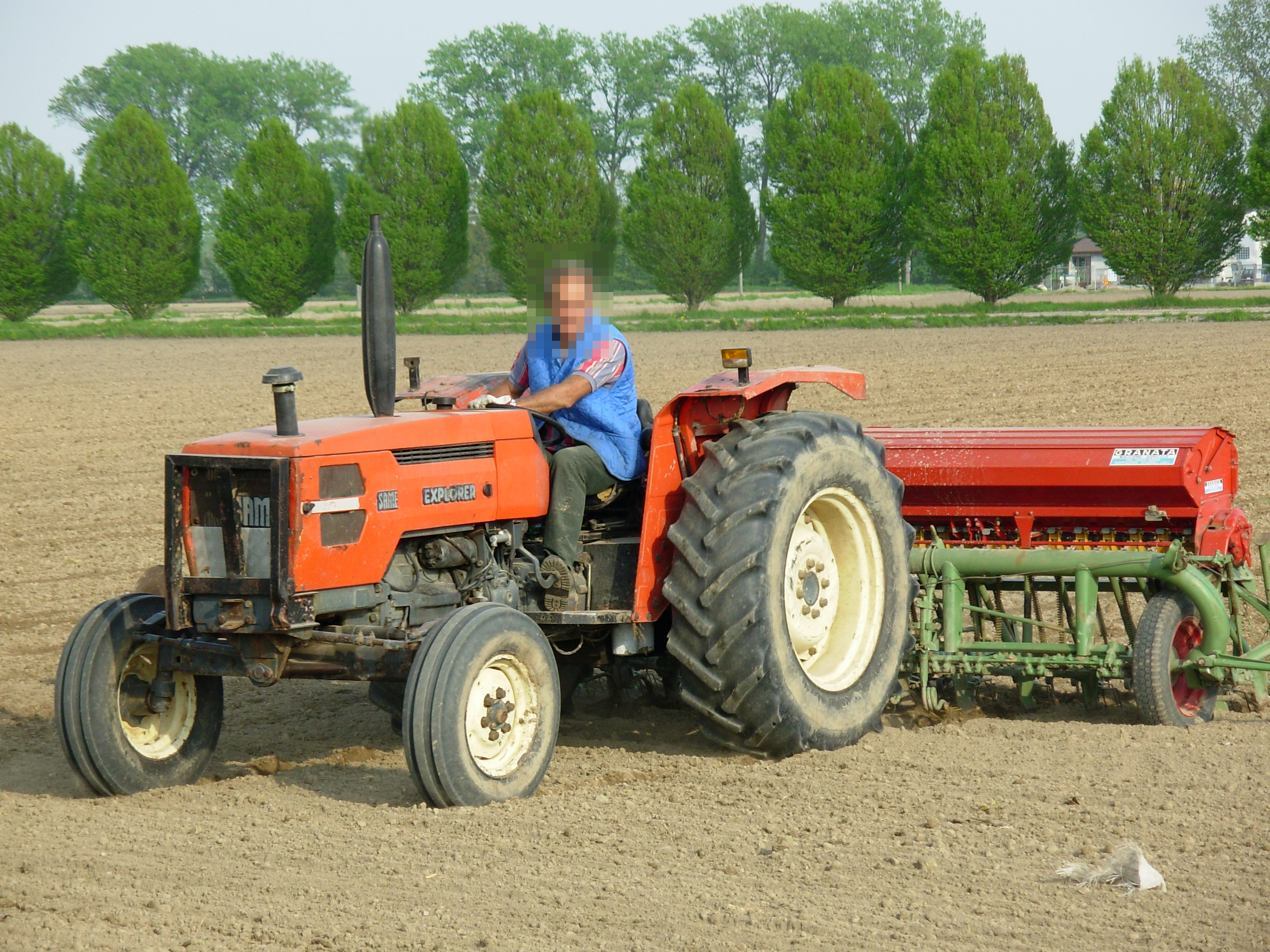
SAME Explorer

Production of the brand's petrol powered models began in 1950, with the introduction of the 10 HP SAME 4R/10 and the 20 HP 4R/20.

1952 saw the launch of the DA 25, the first mass-produced modern tractor with all-wheel drive, powered by a 25 HP, 2280 cm^{3} two cylinder diesel engine, with a 7 speed transmission and a top speed of 24.3 km/h. The name DA stood for Diesel Aria (Diesel Air), as the engine was air-cooled, in keeping with SAME traditions. Mass production of four-wheel drive tractors, with original dual traction system, already conceived in 1928, begins.

The new DA 30 DT was launched in 1957. Offered as 8 variants, this model was the replacement for the DA 25. During this period, SAME also introduced and manufactured a range of specific implements such as ploughs (single blade, double blade, disc and reversible ploughs), spring tine cultivators, disc harrows, rototillers, backhoes, cutter bars, tipper trailers, irrigation pumps and auger drills. The first DA 30 DT models were painted orange with green wheels, while towards the end of the 1950s, the colour scheme was changed to red for the bodywork and wheels and dark grey for the engine.

The SAME 240 was launched in 1958. This was known as the 'intelligent tractor', as it was equipped as standard with the innovative S.A.C. ('Stazione Automatica di Controllo' - 'Automatic Control Station') lower hitch arm draft control system conceived by SAME, which would be implemented across the entire range over the following years. This tractor was powered by a 42 HP two cylinder unit, with 6 forward speeds, one reverse speed and a top speed of 28.9 km/h.

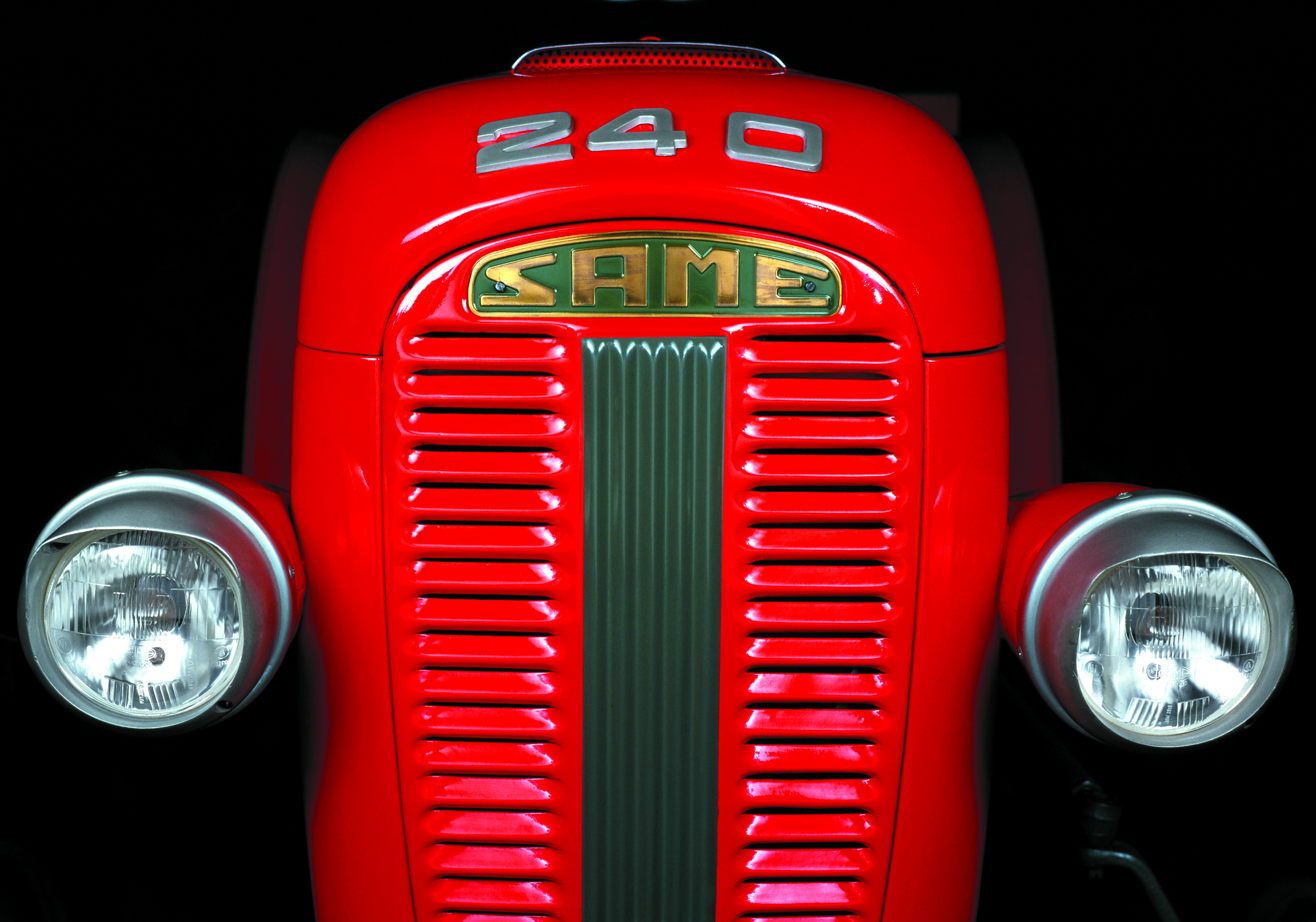
Front view of the SAME 240 tractor model from 1959

=== From the Italian economic boom to the late 1970s ===
1961 was the year of the SAME Puledro and the Samecar, a tractor which, after working the land, could then also be used to transport produce in its load bay. A new range of 6 and 8 cylinder engines was also developed during this period.

At the Verona expo in 1965, SAME presented its new V engines and the Italia V, Atlanta, Sametto V and 450 V tractors. Another major development was the change from traditional rounded cowls to a more modern, boxy design.

The Centauro range, consisting of three different models, was launched in 1965. These tractors were powered by a 3500 cm^{3} V4 engine producing 55 HP, with 8 forward speeds, 4 reverse speeds and a top speed of 34.8 km/h.

The 1972 Corsaro 70 and Saturno 80 tractors were presented in 1972. In 1973, SAME bought Lamborghini Trattori S.p.A. from Ferruccio Lamborghini. In 1979, SAME acquired the Swiss Hürlimann Traktoren brand and changed its name to Gruppo SLH (SAME+Lamborghini+Hürlimann), becoming the second largest tractor producer in Italy and a leading manufacturer on a global scale.

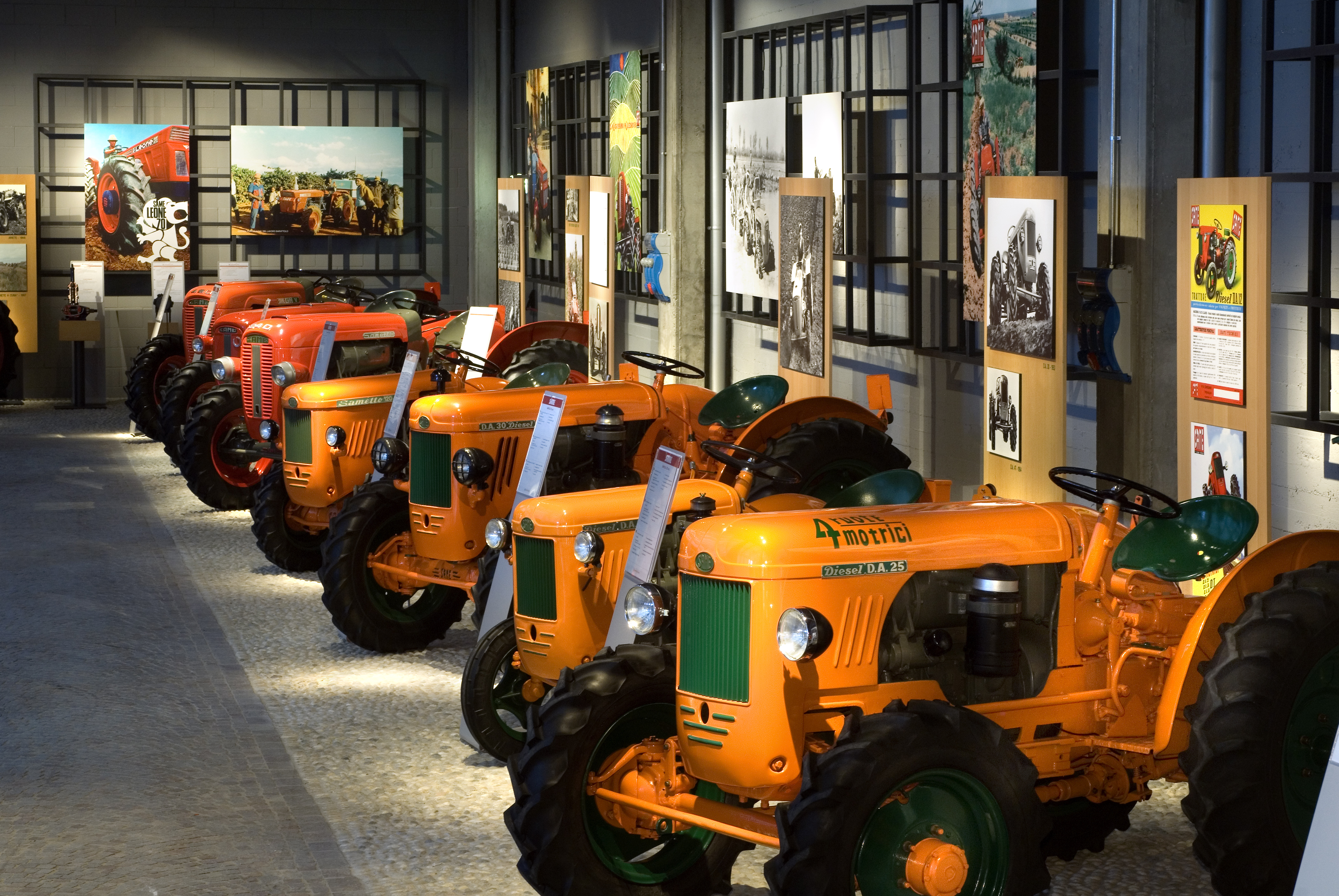
Tractors exhibited in the SAME History Museum

=== From the 1980s to the end of the 20th century ===
The SAME Explorer family, which was to become one of the most successful product ranges in the history of the company, was launched in 1983. This was the first Italian-built tractor with a top speed of 40 km/h, and the only tractor with 4-wheel braking.

The technology offered by Gruppo SLH at the end of the 1980s also included the original Twin Vision video camera rear view system. SAME engine technology also took a major step forward, with electronically controlled fuel injection available for the entire 1000 Series.

In 1991, the Electronic PowerShift transmission, designed specifically for high power applications, was launched together with the Titan range, while the Frutteto II introduced a family of tractors dedicated for use in fruit orchards and vineyards.

In 1995, Gruppo SLH acquired the agricultural machinery division of Klöckner-Humboldt-Deutz, giving rise to the SAME Deutz-Fahr group.

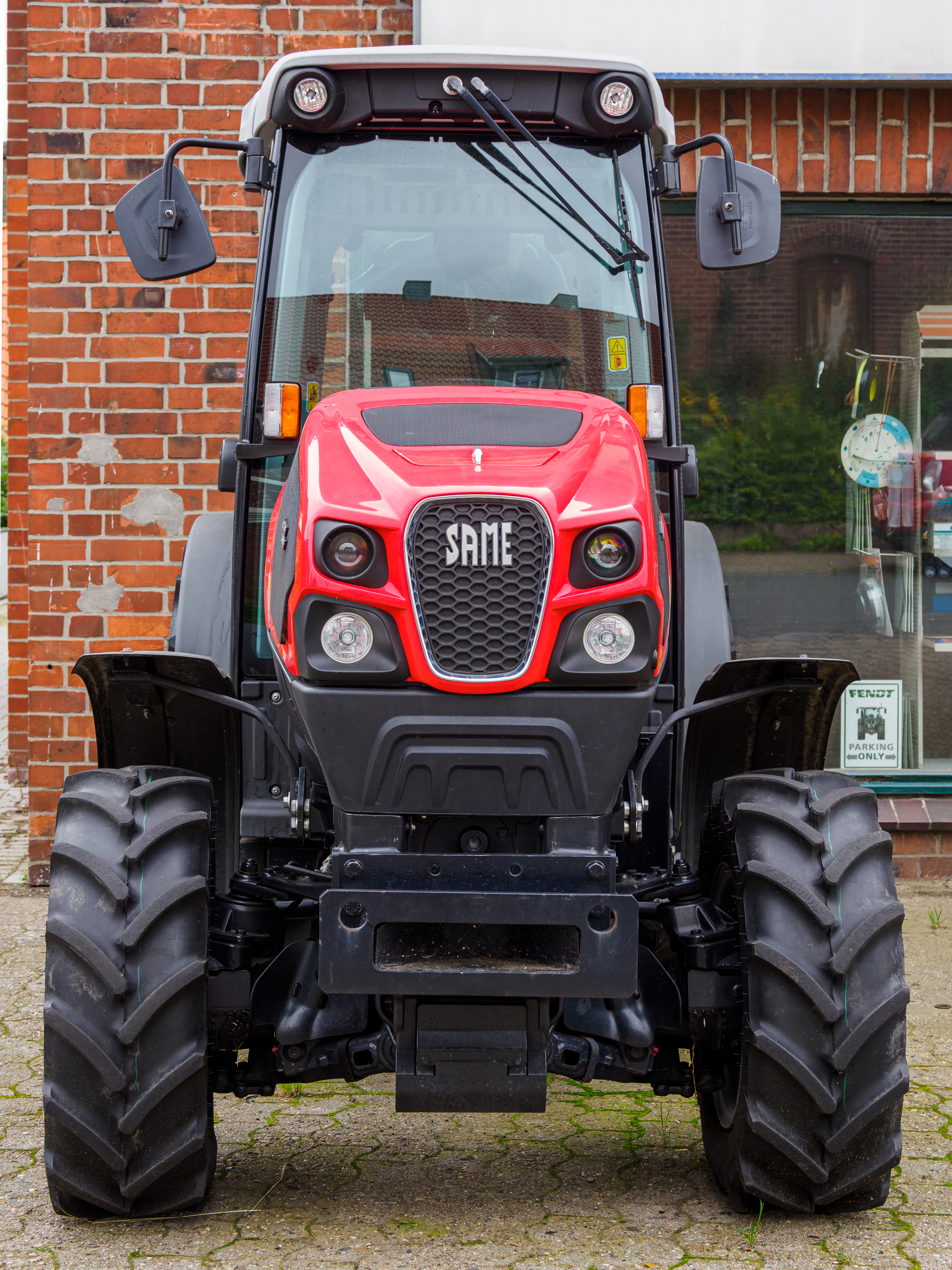
SAME Frutteto S90.4

=== The 21st century ===
In 1999, SAME introduced the Galileo self-levelling system in the Rubin 200 tractor range. This system, developed to facilitate working on gradients, won the Golden Tractor for design Millennium Edition award in 2000.

2007 marked the 80th anniversary of the first tractor built by Francesco and Eugenio - the Cassani 40CV.

On 12 October 2012, SAME celebrated its 70th birthday at its historical headquarters in Treviglio. To mark the occasion, the Italian brand announced a spate of new investments and new models for the future, chief among which the "Virtus" (100-110-120-130 HP) tractor family, designed by Italdesign Giugiaro.

== Models produced ==
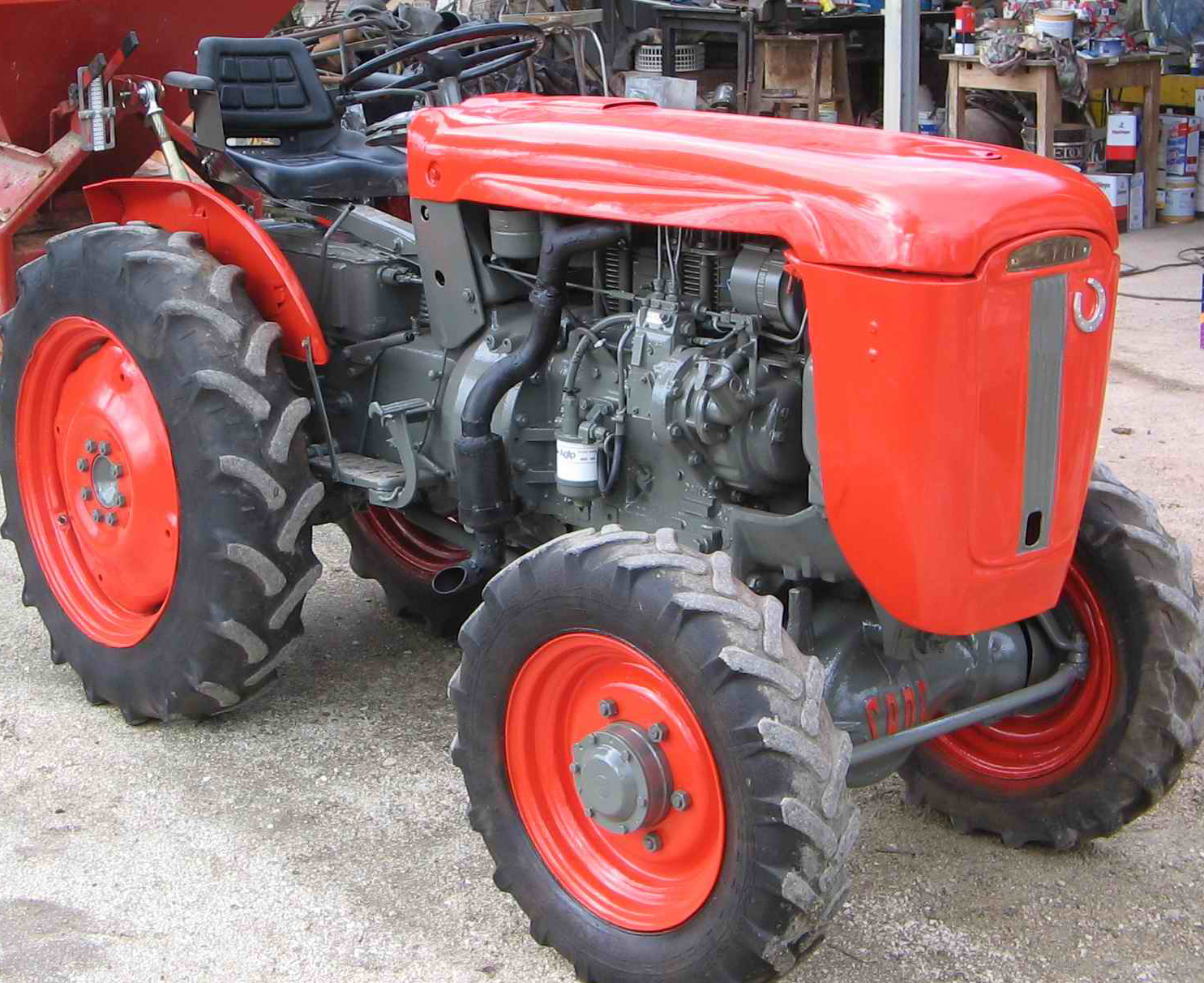
SAME Puledro DT Vigneto (1961)

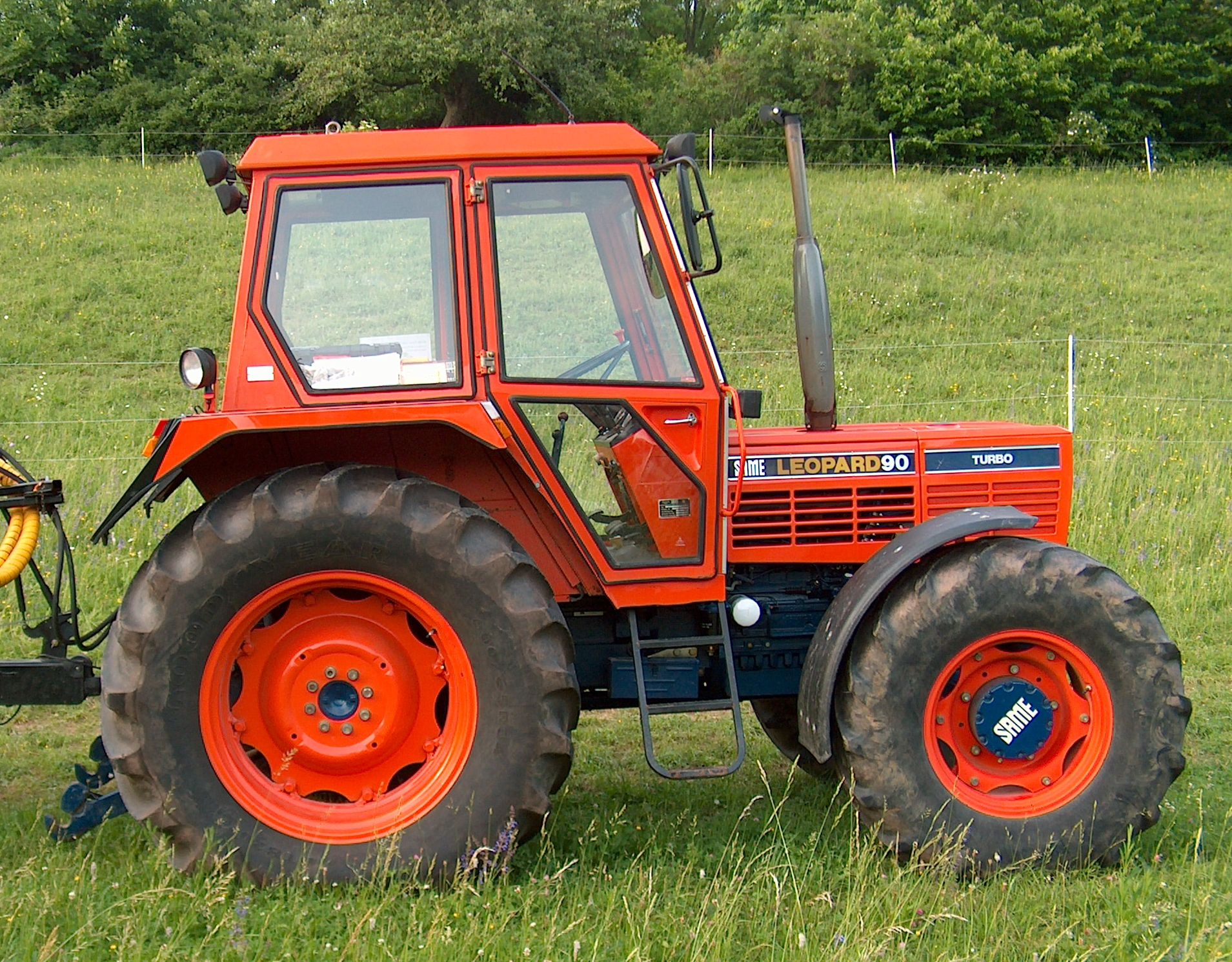
SAME Leopard 90

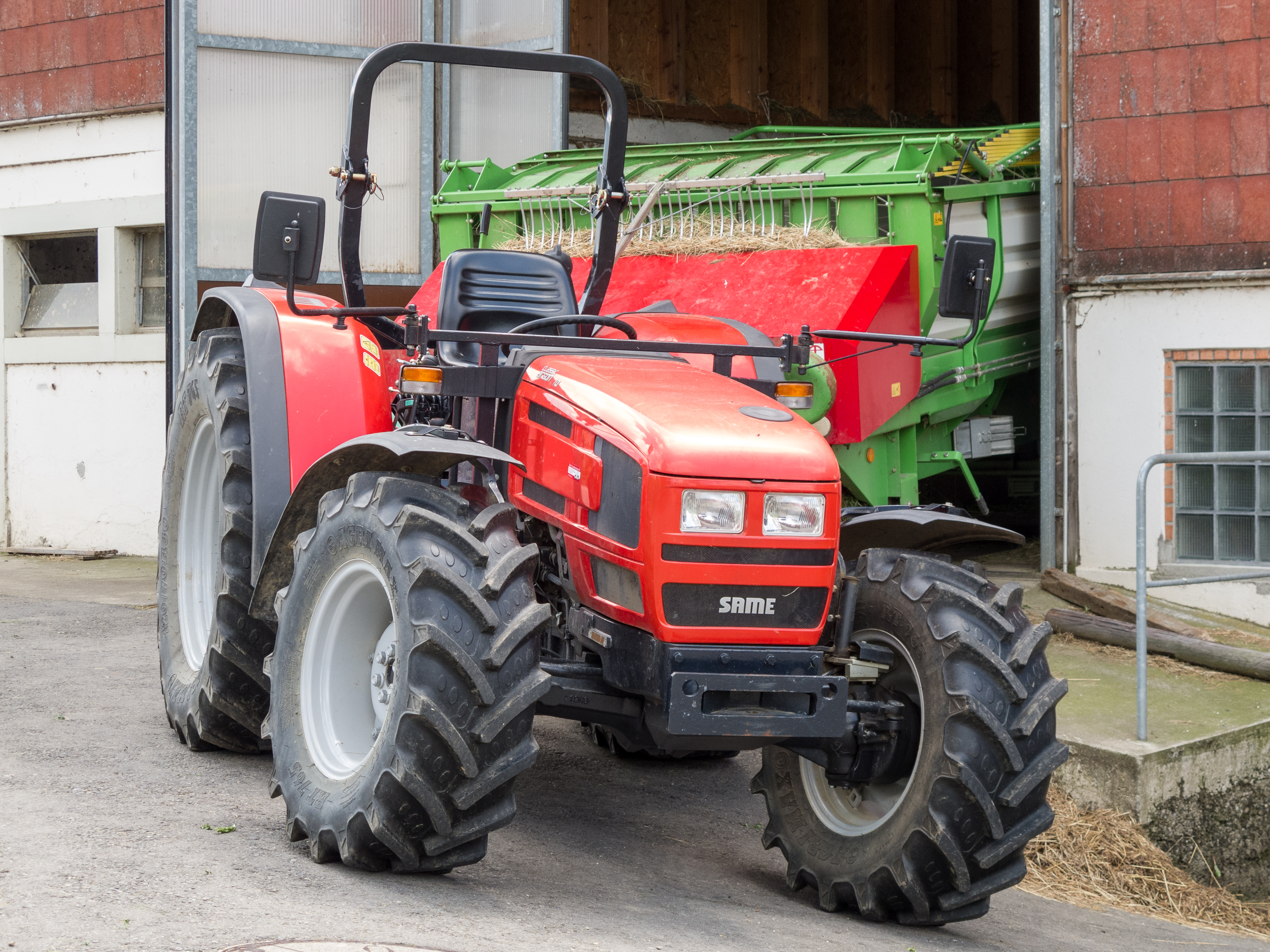
SAME Argon Classic 70

Cassani:

- (1927) Cassani 40CV
- (1934) Cassani revolver diesel marine engine
- (1938-1940) A4/90 (marine) and B8/110 (aeronautical) revolver, horizontally opposed diesel engines
- (1957) Super Cassani Diesel D.A. 47

SAME:

- (1946) 851 motor mower
- (1948) Universal small tractor
- (1950) 4R/10
- (1952) D.A.12 - D.A.25 DT
- (1953) D.A.38
- (1954) D.A.12 - D.A.55
- (1956) D.A.17 - D.A.57
- (1957) DA 30 - Sametto 18
- (1958) SAC (Stazione Automatica di Controllo)
- (1959) 240 DT – 360 – 480 Ariete – Sametto 120
- (1960) Samecar – Puledro
- (1961) 250
- (1965) Italia V – Atlanta
- (1966) 450 V – Centauro
- (1967) Leone 70
- (1969) Minitauro 55
- (1968) Ariete
- (1971) Delfino
- (1972) Sirenetta – Saturno – Corsaro – Aurora – Drago
- (1973) Minitauro Cingolato
- (1974) Falcon
- (1975) Falcon Cingolato – Panther
- (1976) Buffalo
- (1977) Tiger
- (1978) Leopard – Taurus Cingolato
- (1979) Centurion – Leopard Cingolato – Minitaurus – Row Crop – Vigneron – Condor – Tiger Six
- (1980) Hercules – Condor Cingolato – Jaguar
- (1981) Trident – Mercury
- (1982) Fox
- (1983) Ranger – Explorer
- (1984) Galaxy – Explorer Cingolato
- (1985) Laser
- (1986) Solar
- (1987) Solar Cingolato – Frutteto
- (1989) Aster – Antares
- (1991) Titan
- (1993) Argon – Solaris
- (1994) Silver
- (1995) Rock – Dorado
- (1997) Golden
- (1999) Krypton – Rubin
- (2000) Diamond
- (2001) Argon
- (2002) Silver 160-180 – Iron

== Models in production ==
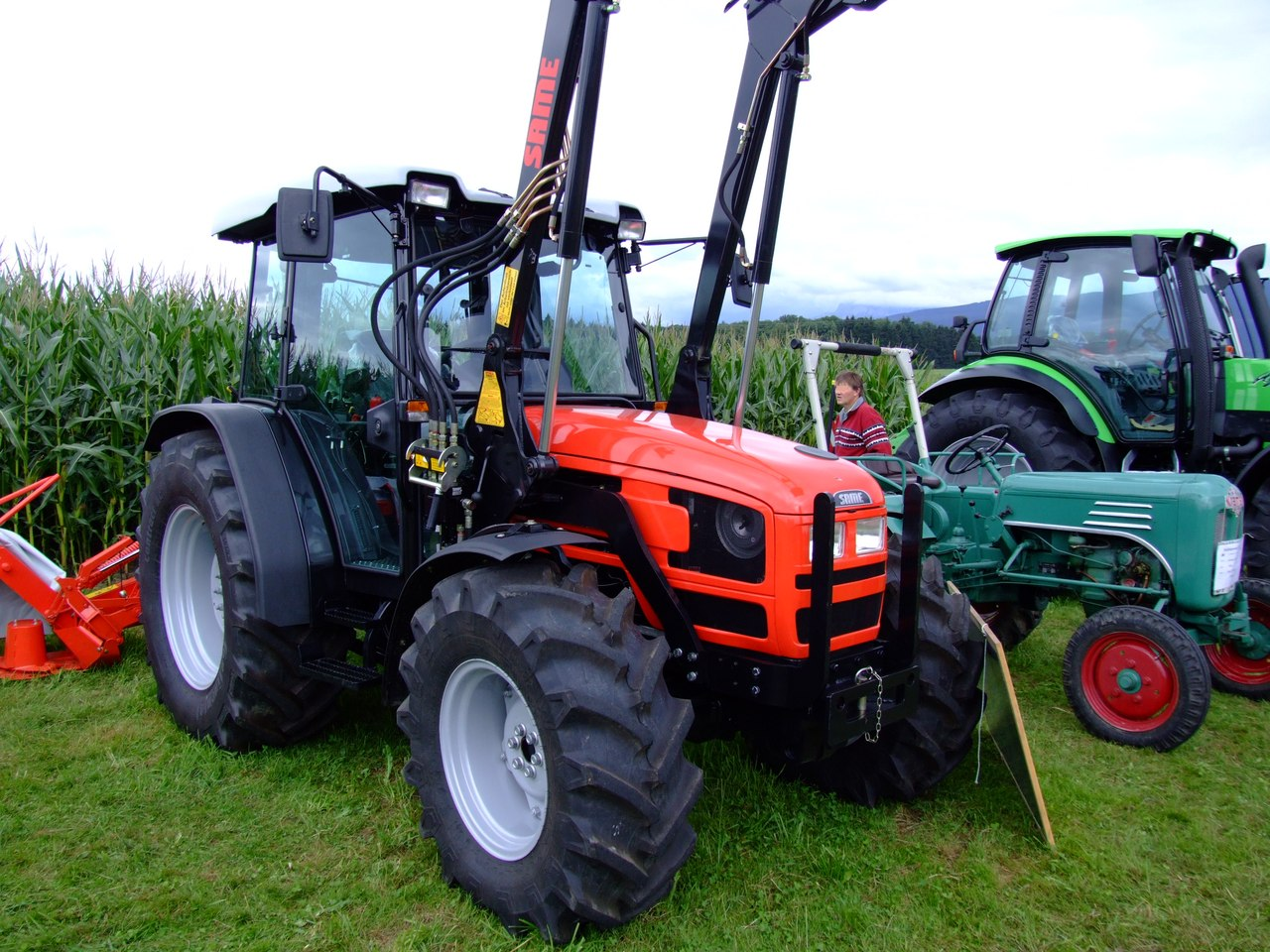
SAME Dorado

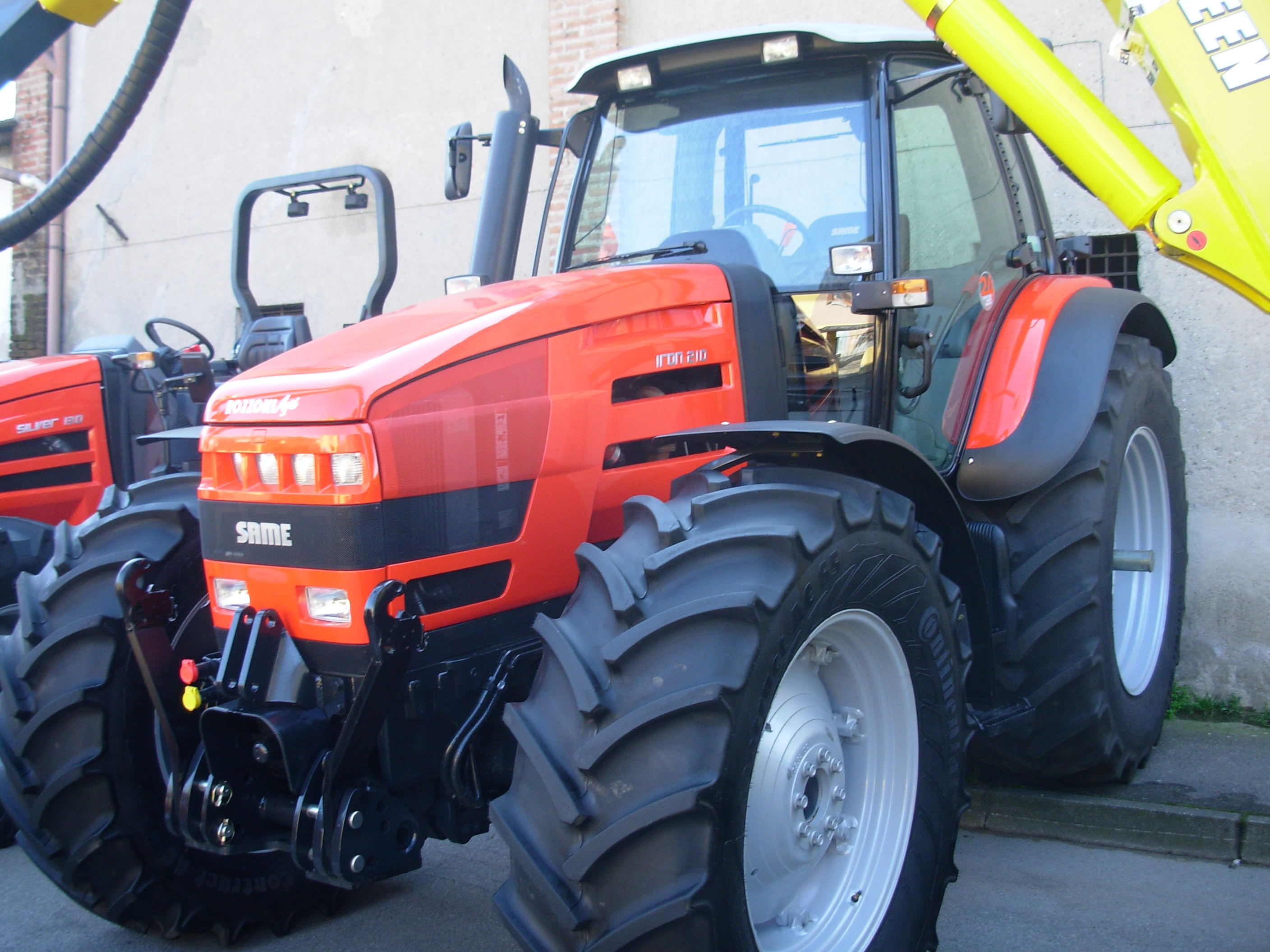
SAME Iron 210

SAME tractors:

- Solaris (35-55 HP)
- Tiger (65-75 HP)
- Argon^{3} (65-75-80 HP)
- Dorado Classic (60-70-80-90-90.4 HP)
- Dorado (70-80-90-90.4-100.4 HP)
- Frutteto^{3} Classic (60-70-80-80.4-90-100 HP)
- Frutteto^{3} (80-90-100-110 HP)
- Krypton^{3} F (90-100 HP)
- Krypton^{3} V (80 HP)
- Krypton^{3} SIX (110 HP)
- Explorer (80-90-90.4-100-105.4-115.4 HP)
- Virtus J (90-100-110-120 HP)
- Virtus (100-110-120-130 HP)
- Fortis (120.4-130.4-140.4-140-150.4-150-160.4-160-180-190 HP)
- Audax (200-220 HP)
- Front loaders

== Scale models available ==
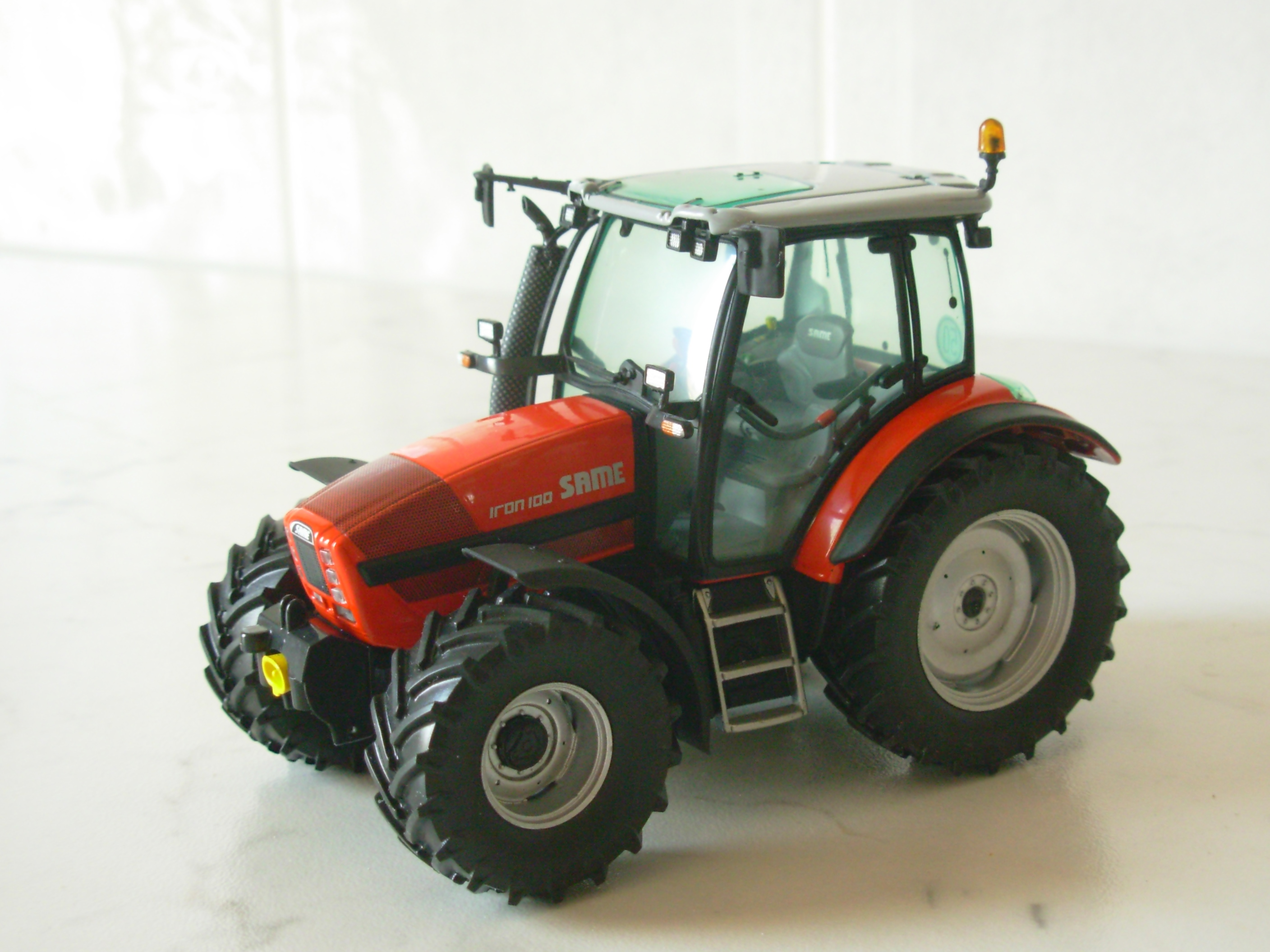
SAME Iron 100 model

Numerous 1:32 and 1:43 scale models of SAME tractors are produced by renowned model manufacturers such as Ros-Agritec in Italy, Siku in Germany, Universal Hobbies in France and Britains in the United Kingdom.

Cassani:

- 40CV (Ros-Agritec)

SAME:

- D.A.25 (Ros-Agritec)
- Iron 200 (Ros-Agritec)
- Explorer III 100 (Ros-Agritec)
- Iron 100 (Universal Hobbies)
- Titan 190 (Ros-Agritec)
- Explorer (Ros-Agritec)
- 265 (Siku)
- Iron 110 (Siku)
- Diamond 265 (Siku)
- 240DT (Universal Hobbies)
- D.A. 30 DT Trento Universale (Universal Hobbies)
- D.A. 12 (Universal Hobbies)
- Diamond 270 (Bruder)
- Virtus 120 (Universal Hobbies)
- Galaxy 170 (Britains)
- Rubin 150 (Britains)
