= Riccio =

Riccio may refer to:

- Aloisio Riccio, bishop
- Andrea Riccio, Italian sculptor
- Antonello Riccio, Italian painter
- Bill Riccio, American activist
- Dan Riccio, American businessman
- Daniele Riccio, Italian engineer
- Dennis Riccio, American NFL footballer
- Domenico Riccio, Italian painter
- Eros Riccio, Italian chess player
- Felice Riccio, Italian painter
- Giovanni Battista Riccio, Italian musician
- Luigi Riccio
- Mariano Riccio, Italian painter
- Michel Riccio, lawyer
- Paolo Riccio, German philosopher
- Suzanne Riccio-Major, boxer
- Thomas Riccio (disambiguation), multiple people
