= Antonio Paticchi =

Italian painter

Antonio Paticchi (Rome, February, 1762- February, 1788) was an Italian painter, active in Rome, painting pastel portraits.

== Biography ==
Born in Rome in 1762, Paticchi received his initial artistic training from his father, who influenced his artistic development. He was noted for his many designs, many derived from Polidoro da Caravaggio. His artistic talent led to significant commissions at a young age, including the opportunity to create frescoes for the refectory of the Carmelites in Velletri. He painted the gallery in the Palace of Count Torrazzi, depicting the Carriage of the Night. He also painted two canvases depicting the Loves of Jove. He also painted a Murder of the Family of Niobe.

He died from a heart ailment.
