= Fornovo =

Fornovo may refer to:

- Fornovo di Taro, in the province of Parma, Italy
- Fornovo San Giovanni, in the province of Bergamo, Italy
- Forum Novum (Fornovo), medieval Vescovio, in the Sabina, Italy

== See also ==
- Battle of Fornovo (1495)
- Battle of Collecchio (1945), sometimes called the Battle of Collecchio-Fornovo
