= Christ Falling on the Way to Calvary =

Painting by Raphael

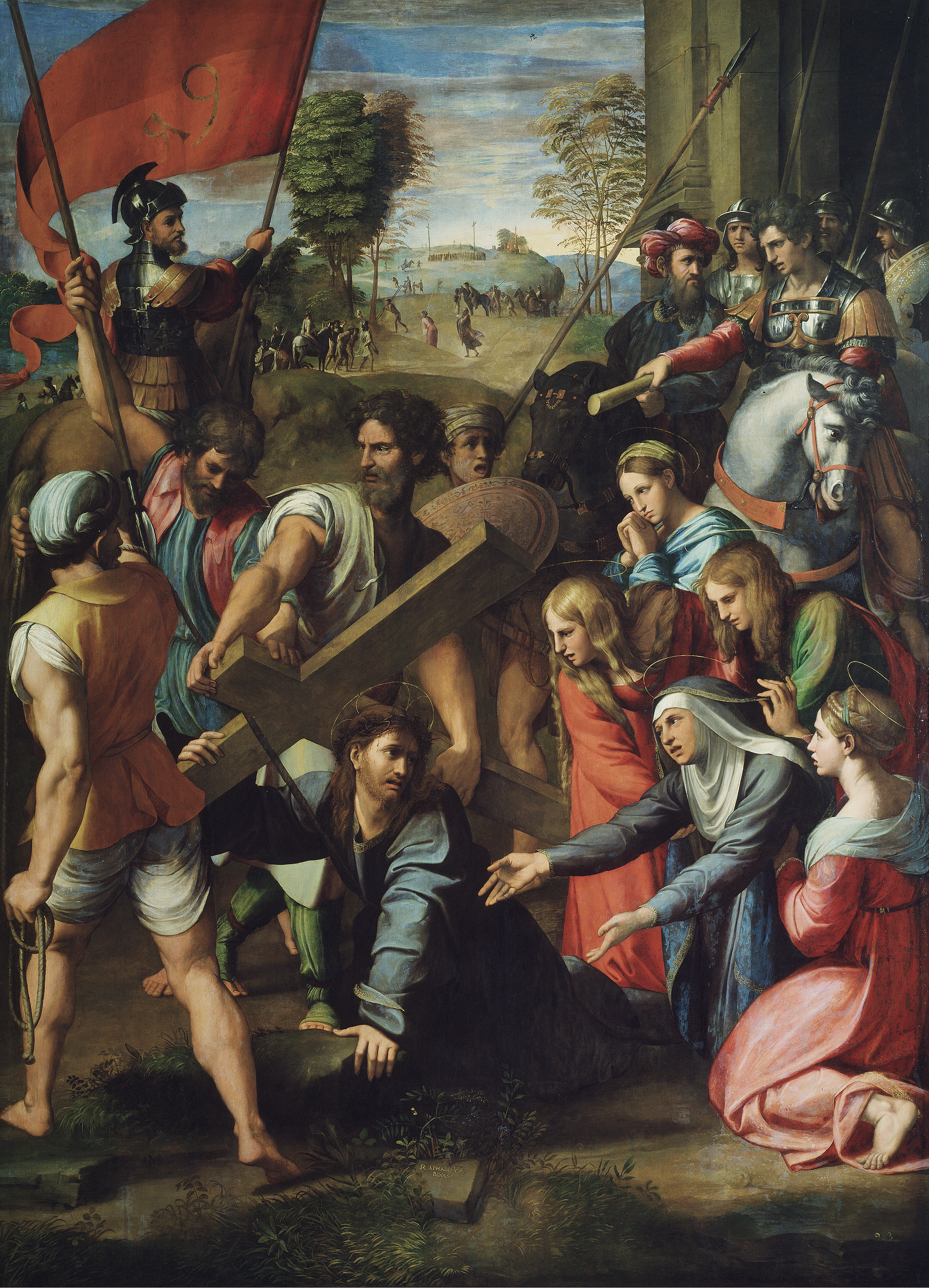
- Artist: Raphael
- Year: c. 1514-1516
- Type: Oil on panel transferred to canvas
- Dimensions: 318 cm × 229 cm (125 in × 90 in)
- Location: Museo del Prado, Madrid

Christ Falling on the Way to Calvary, also known as Lo Spasimo or Il Spasimo di Sicilia, is a painting by the Italian High Renaissance painter Raphael, of c. 1514–16, now in the Museo del Prado in Madrid. It is an important work for the development of his style.

== Description ==
It shows the common subject of Christ Carrying the Cross to his crucifixion, at the moment when he fell and his mother suffers a spasm of agony, the Swoon of the Virgin, or "Lo Spasimo". All the emotion of the painting is densely crammed into the foreground and the background is similar to that of a stage set with distant groups of people and crosses. The man on the left in the foreground is similar to a figure in Raphael's painting The Judgement of Solomon in the Raphael Rooms in the Vatican Palace, except reversed. Simon of Cyrene lifts Christ's cross momentarily and looks sternly at the guards. The four Marys are depicted on the right side of the painting and towering on either side of the composition are the guards. The concept of, and devotion to, the "spasm" of the Virgin was fashionable, if somewhat controversial, in early-16th-century Catholicism, although in this work the Virgin has only fallen to her knees, not collapsed or fainted, as is often shown.

== History ==
The panel was commissioned by the Sicilian monastery of Santa Maria dello Spasimo in Palermo. Painted in Rome around 1517, it was shipped by sea, but the ship had a troubled journey and finally sank. This episode was narrated by Vasari:

...As it was being borne by sea to Palermo, a great tempest cast the ship upon a rock, and it was broken to pieces, and the crew lost, and all the cargo, except this picture, which was carried in its case by the sea to Genoa. Here being drawn to shore, it was seen to be a thing divine, and was taken care of, being found uninjured, even the winds and waves in their fury respecting the beauty of such a work.

As the news of this was spread abroad, the Sicilian monks sought to regain the miraculous painting, but they had to ask for the Pope's intercession to retrieve it. It was carried safely to Sicily, and placed in Palermo, where it acquired great fame.

In 1661 the painting was acquired by the Spanish Viceroy Ferrando de Fonseca on behalf of King Philip IV, who wanted it placed on the main altarpiece of the Royal Alcazar of Madrid chapel. Then it stayed in Paris from 1813 to 1822, because it was one of the paintings Napoleon took as booty during his war campaigns, and while there the painting was transferred to canvas, a practice much adopted in France during those times. After Paris, the picture (unlike many) was returned and finally re-integrated into the Spanish royal collection, later transferred to the Prado. Its present condition is not very good, mainly due to its change of support. However, its quality is clearer since cleaning and restoration in 2012.

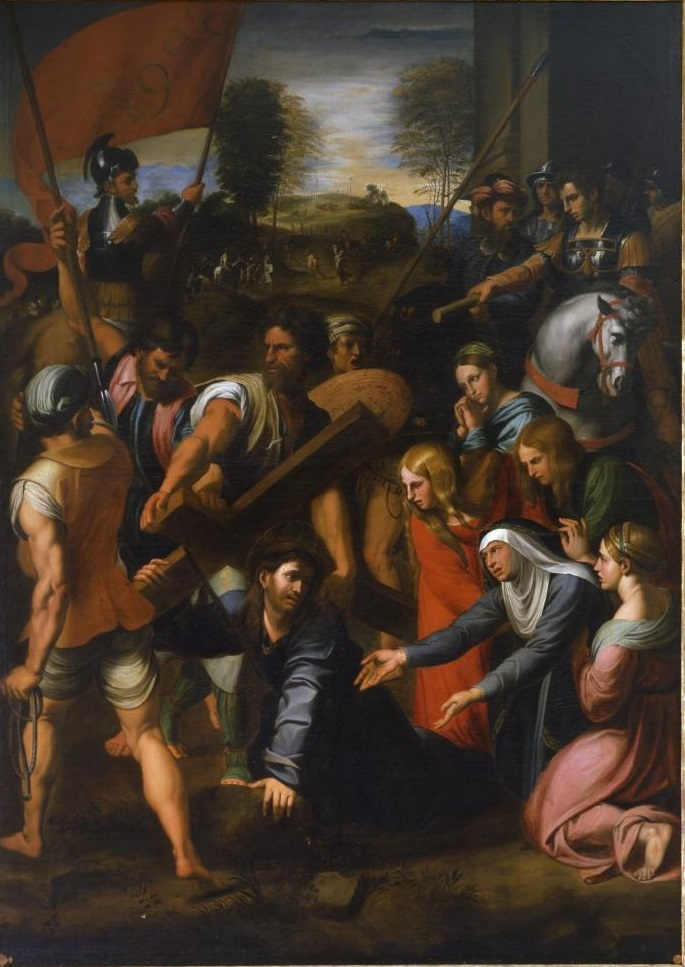
Copy by Juan Carreño de Miranda, 1674

In the past its status as a work by the hand of Raphael has been disputed, but it is now generally accepted as not merely designed but in large part painted by Raphael himself, no doubt with the usual workshop assistance for the easier areas.

Perhaps by royal commission, in 1674, Juan Carreño de Miranda executed a splendid copy of Raphael's original, which was displayed to the public on the main altar of the Convent of Santa Ana of barefoot Carmelites in Madrid. Carreño, renouncing his own style, much looser and more fluffy, faithfully follows the color, the finished invoice and the precise drawing of the original. It belongs and is at display at The Real Academia de Bellas Artes de San Fernando in Madrid.

== See also ==
- List of paintings by Raphael
- Christ Going to Calvary, 1534 painting by Polidoro da Caravaggio

== Bibliography ==
- De Vecchi, Pierluigi, Raffaello, Rizzoli, Milan (1975). (in Italian)
- Franzese, Paolo, Raffaello, Mondadori Arte, Milan (2008). (in Italian)
- Gherardi, Pompeo, Della Vita E Delle Opere Di Raffaello Sanzio Da Urbino (1874), Kessinger Publishing (2010). (in Italian)
- Hoeniger, Cathleen, The Afterlife of Raphael's Paintings, Cambridge University Press (2010).
- Penny, Nicholas, National Gallery Catalogues (new series): The Sixteenth Century Italian Paintings, Volume I, 2004, National Gallery Publications Ltd, ISBN 1-85709-908-7
