= Pagazzano =

- Comune
- Comune di Pagazzano
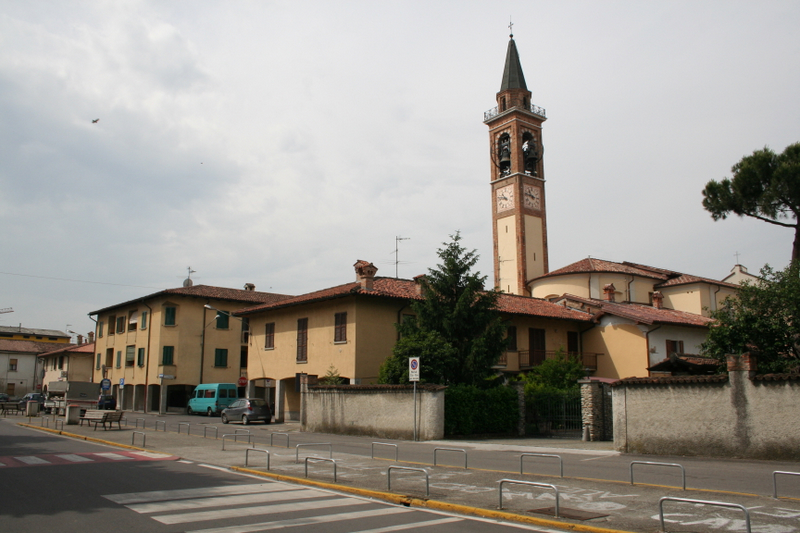
- Centre of the town with church

- Location of Pagazzano in Italy Pagazzano (Lombardy)
- Coordinates: 45°32′N 9°40′E
- Country: Italy
- Region: Lombardy
- Province: Province of Bergamo (BG)

Government
  - Mayor: Daniele Bianchi (Civic list)

Area
  - Total: 5.04 km^{2} (1.95 sq mi)
- Elevation: 126 m (413 ft)

Population (Jun. 2023)
  - Total: 2,104
  - Density: 417/km^{2} (1,080/sq mi)
- Demonym: Pagazzanesi
- Time zone: UTC+1 (CET)
  - Summer (DST): UTC+2 (CEST)
- Postal code: 24040
- Dialing code: 0363
- ISTAT code: 016154
- Patron saint: S. Nazarius and Celsus
- Saint day: Every second sunday of september
- Website: https://www.comune.pagazzano.bg.it/

Pagazzano (Bergamasque: Pagasà) is a comune (municipality) in the Province of Bergamo in the Italian region of Lombardy, located about 40 kilometres (25 mi) east of Milan and about 20 kilometres (12 mi) south of Bergamo. As of 31 December 2018, it had a population of 2,097 and an area of 5.0 square kilometres (1.9 mi^{2}).

Pagazzano borders the following municipalities: Bariano, Brignano Gera d'Adda, Caravaggio, Morengo.

== Name origin ==
There is no certainty on the name's etymology. Some claim it is a derivation of pagus and anus, i.e. "ancient village", whilst others believe it derives from the name of a Roman landowner, Pacatius. Pagazzano is mentioned in the edict for the compartment of the State of Milan of 10 June 1757, among the municipalities of the Pieve di Gera d'Adda.

== History ==
Throughout the Middle Ages Pagazzano maintained its characteristics of a small agricultural village with limited strategic-military appeal, despite its central position along the axis of Crema-Bergamo.

A fortification was built in the sixth century, according to some, or in the tenth, according to others, to defend against the raids of the Hungarians.

In the eleventh century Pagazzano already gravitated in the Milanese political and military orbit to find itself in 1300 in the possession of the Viscounts who built a castle here between 1450 and 1475.

Pagazzano and specifically its castle were the object of interest in the age-old opposition between the Visconti-Sforza and the Serenissima (Republic of Venice), passing repeatedly from one state to another, without however improving the socio-economic conditions of the inhabitants of the village. The controversial issue related to the border between the two powers was defined with the construction of the Bergamasque ditch, a channel that also bordered the territory of Pagazzano, delimiting it to the east and relegating it definitively under the influence of Milan.

With the fall of the Sforza dynasty, Pagazzano entered, together with Milan, into the sphere of influence of the French until, in 1559, it passed under the Spanish.

The Spanish period was the hardest for the community of Pagazzano, which - beyond the misgovernment of the new rulers - had to suffer abuses and robberies that blocked the economic and demographic development, possibly contributing to its regression.

With the passage under Austrian domination in 1700, there was a significant improvement in the living conditions of the community, followed by a demographic increase and a general improvement in living conditions.

After the Napoleonic period, Pagazzano returned, with the Congress of Vienna in 1818, under the Austrian domination.

The improvement of the socio-economic conditions of the community during the Austrian period allowed the demographic development that had come to a halt as well as an increase in agricultural production.

The development of Pagazzano increased after 1861 with the unification of Italy, however, a predominantly agricultural economy remained dominant.

== Town ==
Pagazzano's historical center has maintained the same urban landscape that it had in the Middle Ages.

== Demographics ==
The age range from 36 to 53 years is the largest part of the municipal population, counting for 28.5% of the total, followed by the band 18 – 35 years old, which counts 25.1% of the residents.

The industrial development of recent years and the intense building activity, have led to an increase of the inhabitants: comparing the increase in residents with the decrease in the birth rate shows that the increase in population is due to the positive net migration, mainly because of the foreign nationals immigration.

The statistical data on immigration in the municipality showed a preponderance of African immigrants than those from Asian countries and EU citizens. In total the foreign population makes up around 5% of the population.

Historical population

Year	Pop.	±%
1861	902	—
1871	987	+9.4%
1881	1,072	+8.6%
1901	1,092	+1.9%
1911	1,378	+26.2%

Year	Pop.	±%
1921	1,459	+5.9%
1931	1,649	+13.0%
1936	1,496	−9.3%
1951	1,547	+3.4%
1961	1,472	−4.8%

Year	Pop.	±%
1971	1,366	−7.2%
1981	1,576	+15.4%
1991	1,654	+4.9%
2001	1,859	+12.4%

Source: Data from ISTAT
