= Fara Olivana con Sola =

- Comune
- Comune di Fara Olivana con Sola
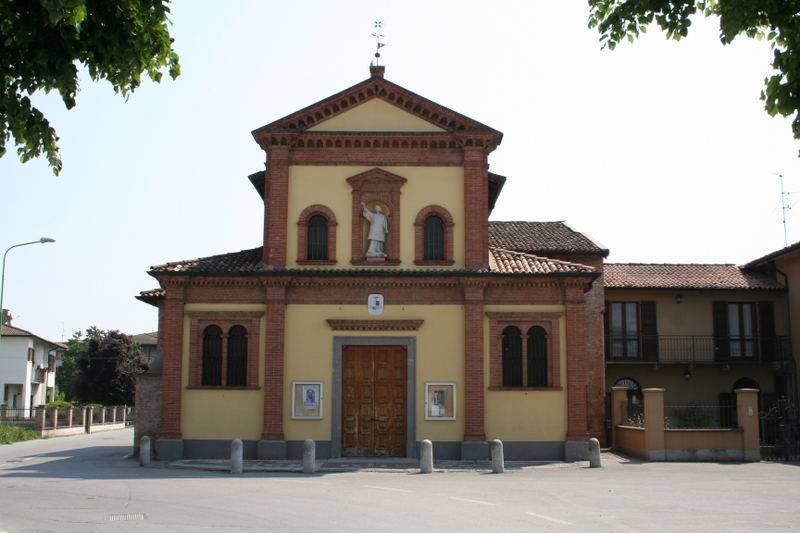
- Fara Olivana con Sola

- Coat of arms

- Location within Italy Location within Lombardy
- Coordinates: 45°30′N 9°45′E
- Country: Italy
- Region: Lombardy
- Province: Bergamo (BG)

Government
  - Mayor: Sabrina Severgnini

Area
  - Total: 5.04 km^{2} (1.95 sq mi)
- Elevation: 107 m (351 ft)

Population (31 May 2021)
  - Total: 1,276
  - Density: 253/km^{2} (656/sq mi)
- Demonym: Faresi
- Time zone: UTC+1 (CET)
  - Summer (DST): UTC+2 (CEST)
- Postal code: 24058
- Dialing code: 0363
- Website: Official website

Fara Olivana con Sola is a comune (municipality) in the Province of Bergamo in the Italian region of Lombardy, located about 45 kilometres (28 mi) east of Milan and about 25 kilometres (16 mi) southeast of Bergamo.

Fara Olivana con Sola borders the following municipalities: Bariano, Castel Gabbiano, Covo, Fornovo San Giovanni, Isso, Mozzanica, Romano di Lombardia. It is formed by two main settlements: Fara Olivana on the north, set of the pieve of Santo Stefano, and the frazione Sola southwards.
