= Gallavresi Palace =

Coordinates: 45°29′50″N 9°38′39″E

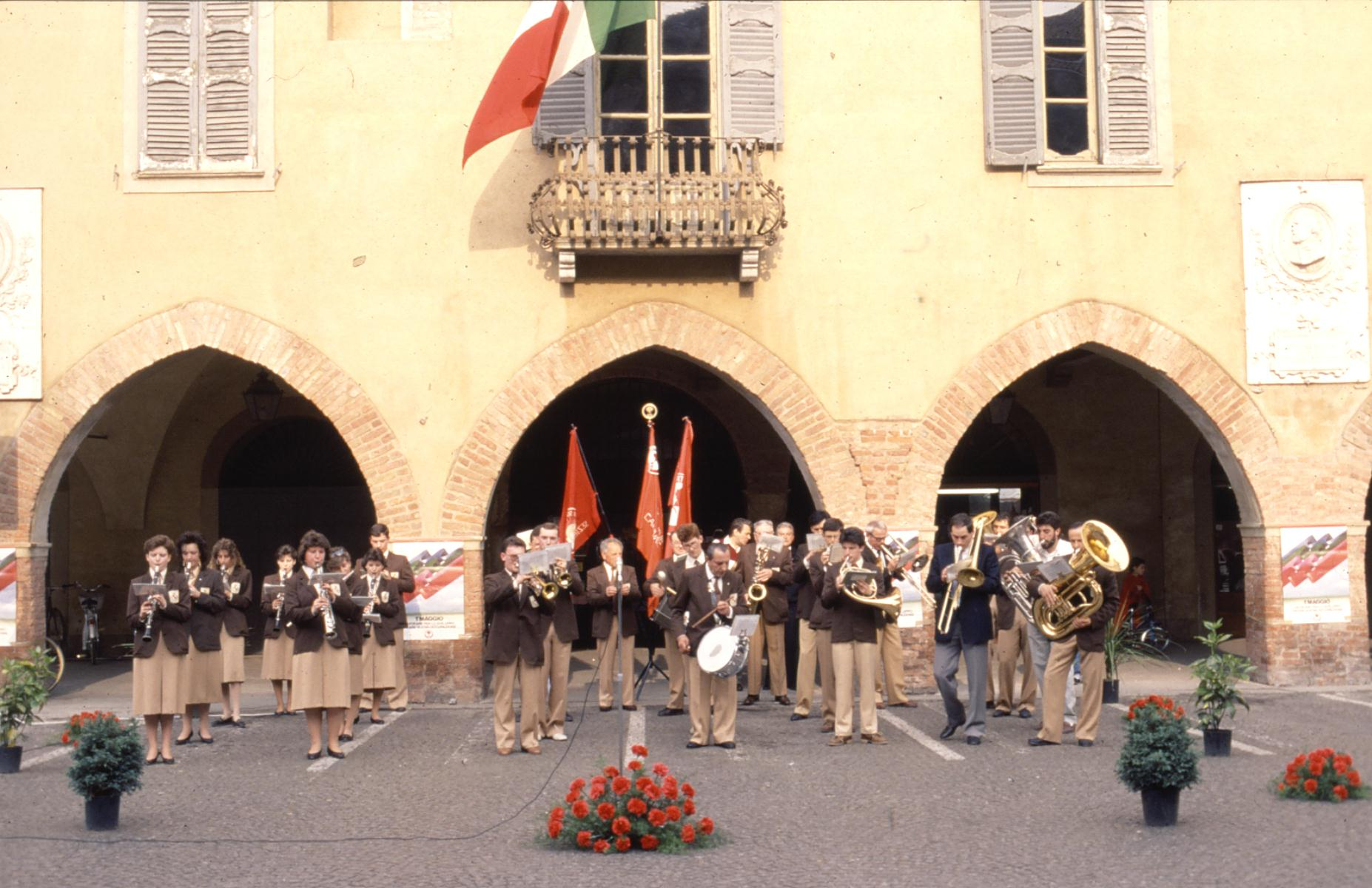
The Palace on 1987 Labour Day.

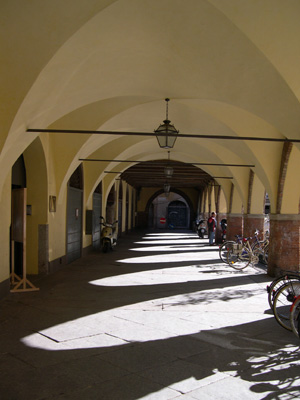
The portico on the facade of the palace.

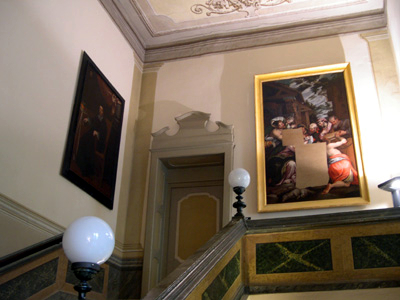
The main stairway.

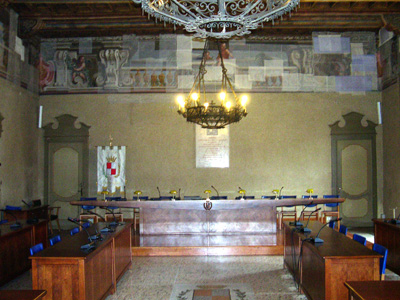
The town council hall.

Gallavresi Palace (or the Marchioness Palace) is a public building dating back, by all accounts, to the second half of the 13th century, which lies in the historical centre of the town of Caravaggio, in Lombardy, northern Italy; it has been see to the town administration since 1947.

== History ==
It is not precisely known when the palace was built, although a valid terminus post quem is given by the International Gothic style of the arches making up the porticoes on the facade, according to which the construction date could be in the second half of the 13th century (when the Gothic style spread in Lombardy) at earliest. Anyway, the palace was probably erected onto a pre-existing building.

The palace began hosting the town hall during the first half of the 14th century; through the centuries it was then ceded to private families, starting from the Marquisses from the Sforza family, and then to the Villani Marquisses and to the Schizzis. The last owners were the Bellinzaghis and the Gallavresis, who kept the property until the first half of the 20th century.

Just after the end of World War II, the town administration bought back the palace to move the town hall there, from the old building in via Mangone.

The palace underwent a heavy restructure in 1981; the restructure of the facade revealed characteristic features which are typical of the International Gothic style.

== Description ==
=== Structure ===
The palace lies in piazza Garibaldi, the central square in the old town; it is surrounded by the pedestrian streets of the historical centre an all the other sides.

By looking at old maps, one can easily detect the existence of two ancient suspended pathways connecting the palace to two neighbouring buildings, home to the podestà and the governor; these were destroyed in 1850, when Palazzo Gallavresi was owned by the Bellinzaghis.

=== Facade ===
Above the porticoes dating back to the 15th century, the facade features marble medals with the faces of four Italian patriots: Giuseppe Mazzini, Giuseppe Garibaldi, Vittorio Emanuele II and Camillo Benso, conte di Cavour. The medals were made between 1884 and 1889.

Between the windows there used to lie the coat of arms of the town marquesses (from the earliest to the last, the Viscontis, the Sforzas, the Villanis and the Schizzis).

=== Interior ===
The main characteristic of the interior of the palace is a majestic stairway, featuring a starry sky on the ceiling, leading to the town council hall, in the upper floor. The hall is typically baroque, and is by far the most richly decorated in the building; it features a decorative bend on all four sides, just below the ceiling, with pictures of winged putti playing instruments. The walls feature baroque frescoes. The floor features a mosaic representing the coat of arms of the town. The entrance of the hall hosts a sculpture of Emilio Gallavresi, who was born and lived in the building and became a member of the Italian parliament as a member of the Italian Socialist Party; the sculpture was made by Enrico Pancera.

== Picture gallery ==
Gallavresi Palace currently hosts the picture gallery belonging to the town administration; all the pictures, some of which date back to the early Renaissance, feature an explanation on their side. The exposition is permanent, and visits for free can be booked via the town administrative offices.
