= Skinheads USA: Soldiers of the Race War =

1993 American documentary film

- Directed by: Shari Cookson
- Starring: Bill Riccio; Mark Lane; Frank Meeink; Christian Picciolini
- Country of origin: United States
- Original language: English

Production
- Producer: Dave Bell
- Cinematography: Mark Morris
- Editor: Andrew McCracken
- Running time: 45 minutes

Original release
- Network: HBO
- Release: 1993

Skinheads USA: Soldiers of the Race War is a 1993 HBO documentary film about a group of white power skinheads involved in the neo-Nazi movement in the southern state of Alabama. It features the white supremacist Bill Riccio, then-leader of the Aryan Youth Front. Other Klan organizations are also featured.

The film was directed by Shari Cookson and produced by Dave Bell.

== Cast ==
- Bill Riccio as himself
- Mark Lane as himself
- Frank Meeink as himself
- Christian Picciolini as himself
