= Christ Going to Calvary =

Painting by Polidoro da Caravaggio

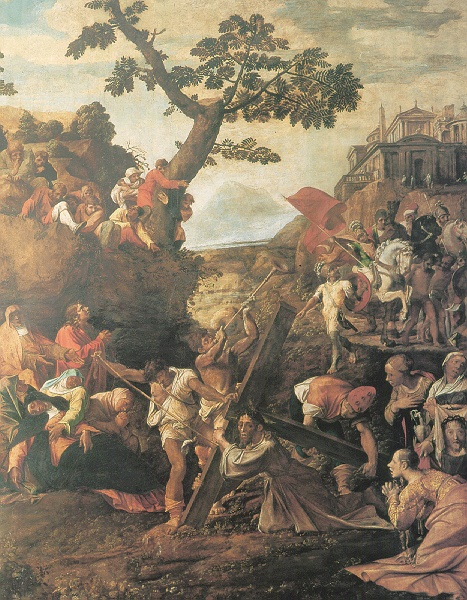
- Artist: Polidoro da Caravaggio
- Completion date: 1534
- Medium: Oil on panel painting
- Subject: Jesus
- Location: National Museum of Capodimonte, Naples, Italy

Christ Going to Calvary is a 1534 oil on panel painting by Polidoro da Caravaggio, now in the National Museum of Capodimonte in Naples.

It was commissioned in 1530 by Pietro Ansalone, consul of the 'confraternita dei Catalani', for the church of Santissima Annunziata dei Catalani in Messina, who intended it to compete with Raphael's 1517 Christ Falling on the Way to Calvary for Santa Maria dello Spasimo in Palermo.

== Sources ==
- Info
