= Morengo =

- Comune
- Comune di Morengo
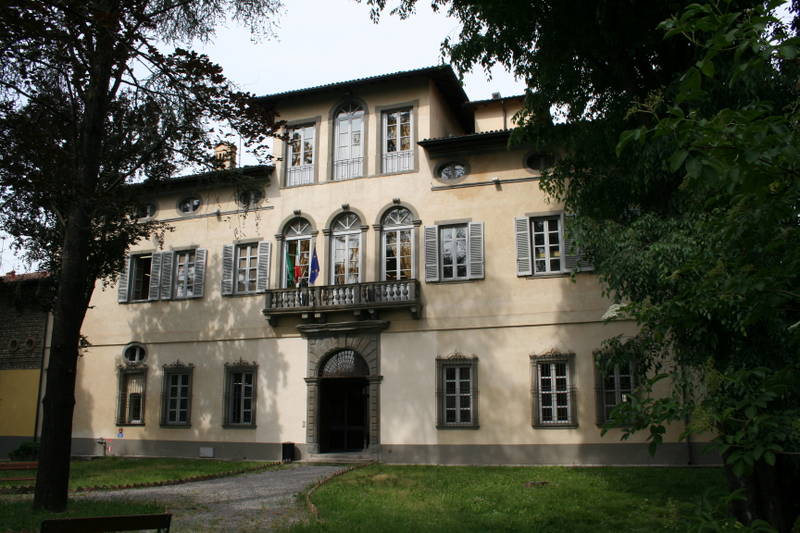
- Town hall

- Location within Italy Location within Lombardy
- Coordinates: 45°32′N 9°42′E
- Country: Italy
- Region: Lombardy
- Province: Bergamo (BG)

Government
  - Mayor: Alessandra Ghilardi

Area
  - Total: 9.57 km^{2} (3.69 sq mi)
- Elevation: 126 m (413 ft)

Population (30 November 2017)
  - Total: 2,537
  - Density: 265/km^{2} (687/sq mi)
- Demonym: Morenghesi
- Time zone: UTC+1 (CET)
  - Summer (DST): UTC+2 (CEST)
- Postal code: 24050
- Dialing code: 0363
- Website: Official website

Morengo (Bergamasque: Morèngh) is a comune (municipality) in the Province of Bergamo in the Italian region of Lombardy, located about 40 kilometres (25 mi) east of Milan and about 20 kilometres (12 mi) south of Bergamo.

Morengo borders the following municipalities: Bariano, Brignano Gera d'Adda, Caravaggio, Cologno al Serio, Martinengo, Pagazzano, Romano di Lombardia.

== Twin towns ==
- Podensac, France, since 2018
