= Romano railway station =

Railway station in Italy

Romano

General information
- Location: Piazza Stazione 6, Romano di Lombardia, Lombardy; Italy
- Coordinates: 45°31′26″N 09°45′26″E
- Owner: Rete Ferroviaria Italiana
- Operator: Trenord
- Line: Milan–Venice railway
- Distance: 56.052 km (34.829 mi) from Milano Centrale
- Platforms: 3
- Tracks: 4

Other information
- Classification: Silver
Location
- Location within Lombardy Location within Northern Italy Location within Italy

Romano (Italian: Stazione di Romano) is a railway station serving the town of Romano di Lombardia, in the region of Lombardy, northern Italy. The station is located on the Milan–Venice railway. The train services are operated by Trenord.

== History ==
Between 1888 and 1931, the station was at a stop on the Bergamo to Soncino tramway.

== Train services ==
The station is served by the following service(s):

- Express services (Treno regionale) Milan - Treviglio - Brescia - Verona
- Regional services (Treno regionale) Sesto San Giovanni - Milan - Treviglio - Brescia

== See also ==
- History of rail transport in Italy
- List of railway stations in Lombardy
- Rail transport in Italy
- Railway stations in Italy
- Bergamo–Soncino Tramway
