= Bariano =

- Comune
- Comune di Bariano
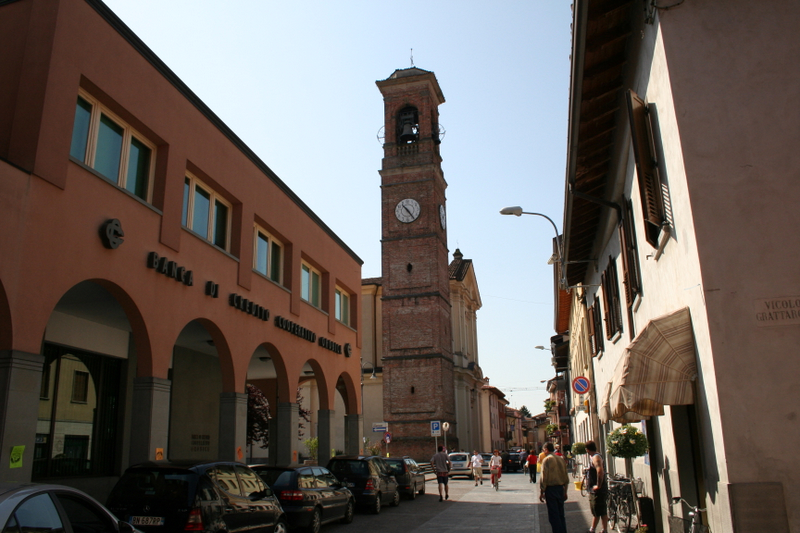
- View from the centre

- Coat of arms

- Location within Italy Location within Lombardy
- Coordinates: 45°31′N 9°42′E
- Country: Italy
- Region: Lombardy
- Province: Bergamo (BG)

Government
  - Mayor: Andrea Rota

Area
  - Total: 7.07 km^{2} (2.73 sq mi)
- Elevation: 114 m (374 ft)

Population (30 April 2017)
  - Total: 4,309
  - Density: 609/km^{2} (1,580/sq mi)
- Demonym: Barianesi
- Time zone: UTC+1 (CET)
  - Summer (DST): UTC+2 (CEST)
- Postal code: 24050
- Dialing code: 0363
- Website: Official website

Bariano (Bergamasque: Barià) is a comune (municipality) in the Province of Bergamo in the Italian region of Lombardy, located about 40 kilometres (25 mi) east of Milan and about 20 kilometres (12 mi) south of Bergamo.

Bariano borders the following municipalities: Caravaggio, Fara Olivana con Sola, Fornovo San Giovanni, Morengo, Pagazzano, Romano di Lombardia.
