= Romano di Lombardia =

- Comune
- Città di Romano di Lombardia
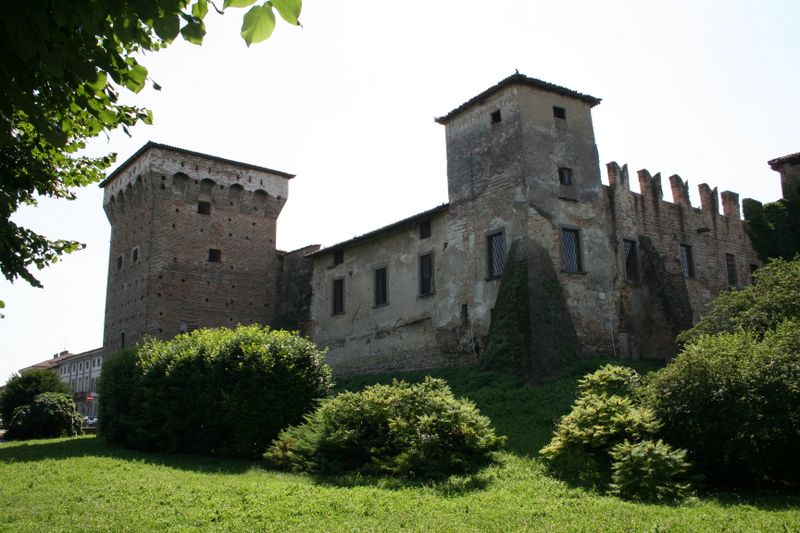

- Coat of arms

- Location within Italy Location within Lombardy
- Coordinates: 45°31′N 9°45′E
- Country: Italy
- Region: Lombardy
- Province: Bergamo (BG)
- Frazioni: Bradalesco, San Lorenzo al Portico, Albarotto

Government
  - Mayor: Sebastian Nicoli

Area
  - Total: 18.0 km^{2} (6.9 sq mi)
- Elevation: 120 m (390 ft)

Population (30 November 2021)
  - Total: 20,600
  - Density: 1,140/km^{2} (2,960/sq mi)
- Demonym: Romanesi
- Time zone: UTC+1 (CET)
  - Summer (DST): UTC+2 (CEST)
- Postal code: 24058
- Dialing code: 0363
- Website: Official website

Romano di Lombardia (Bergamasque: Romà) is a comune (municipality) in the Province of Bergamo in the northern Italian region of Lombardy, located about 45 kilometres (28 mi) east of Milan and about 20 kilometres (12 mi) southeast of Bergamo. It received the honorary title of city with a presidential decree on 17 September 1962.

Romano di Lombardia borders the following municipalities: Bariano, Cologno al Serio, Cortenuova, Covo, Fara Olivana con Sola, Fornovo San Giovanni, Martinengo, Morengo.

== Main sights ==
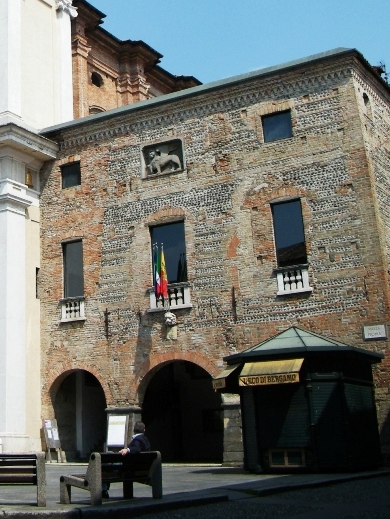
Palazzo della Ragione

- Rocca (castle)
- Palazzo della Ragione (13th century), with frescoed halls and a portico once housing the fish market, of probably Roman origins, as well as another Gothic portico dating to the 15th century and commissioned by Bartolomeo Colleoni.
- Basilica of San Defendente (16th century)
- Countryside church of St. Joseph, one of the most ancient in the area (known from the 9th century)
- Baroque sanctuary of Madonna della Fontana

== People ==
- Giovanni Battista Rubini, tenor
- Giovan Battista Caniana, sculptor
- Vittorio Seghezzi, cyclist

== Transport ==
- Romano railway station
- Highway A35 (Brebemi)
