= Maturino da Firenze =

Italian painter

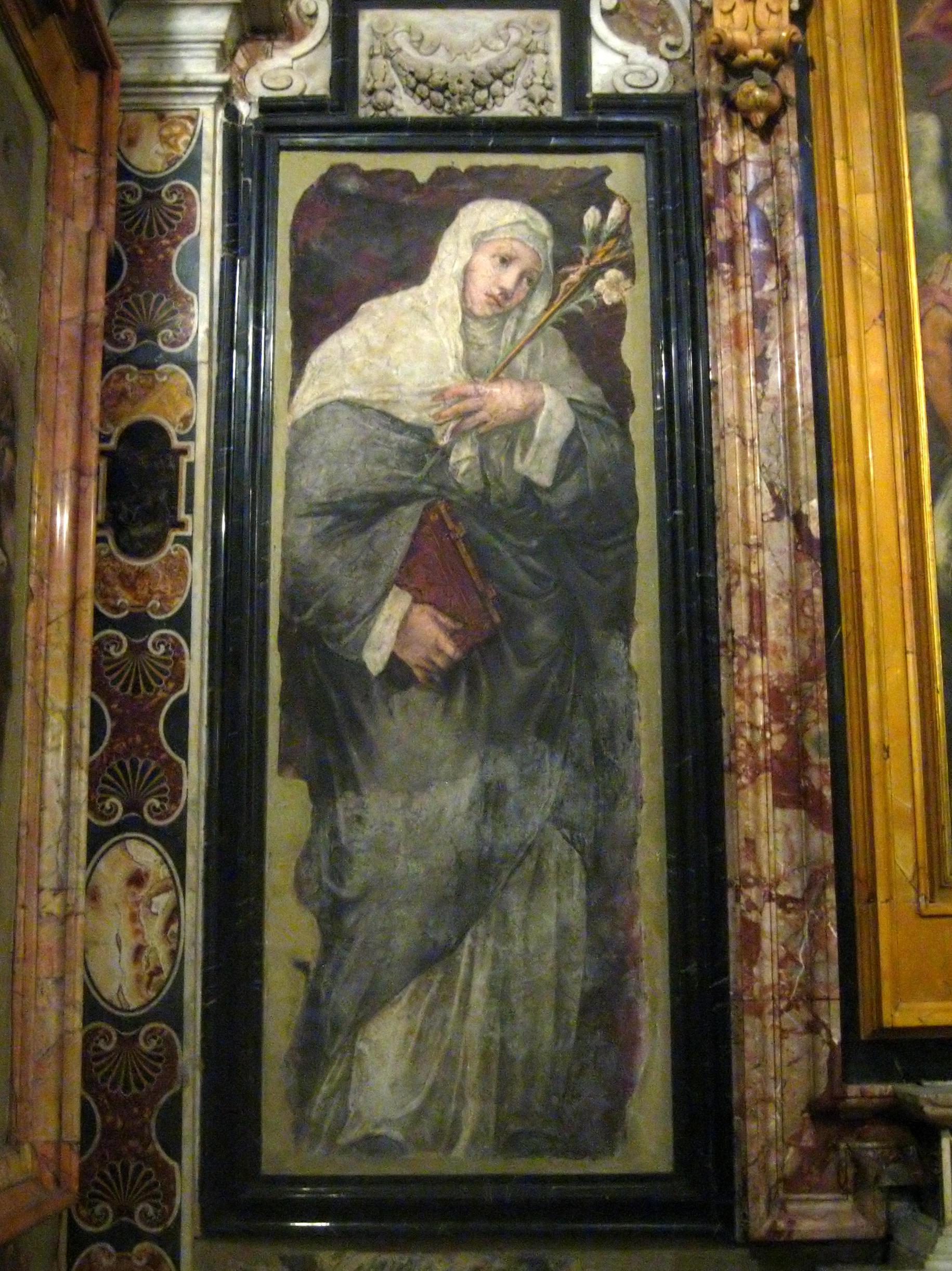
St. Catherine of Siena, by Polidoro da Caravaggio and Maturino da Firenze, in San Silvestro al Quirinale, Rome (c. 1525).

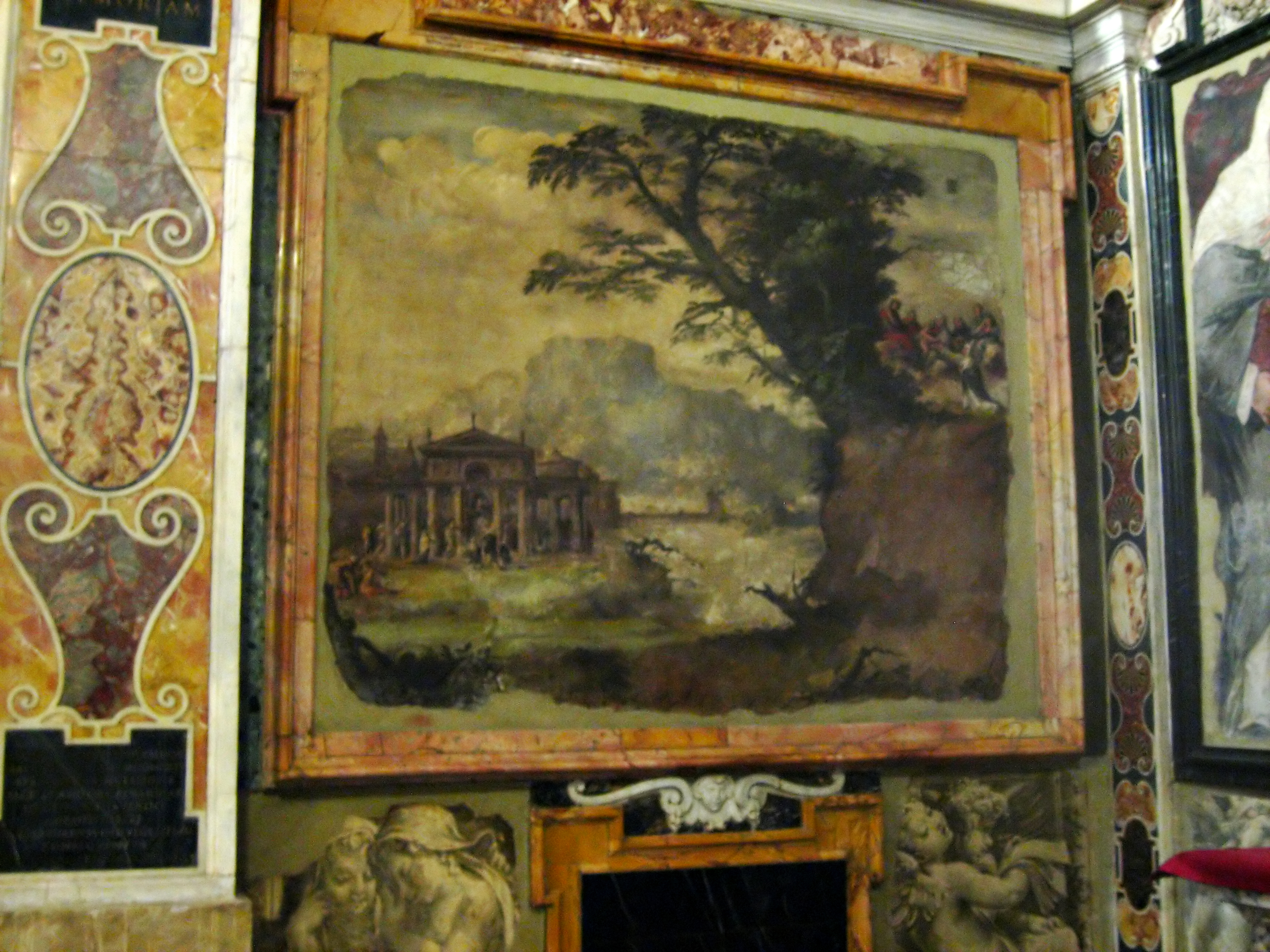
Landscape by Polidoro da Caravaggio and Maturino da Firenze, in San Silvestro al Quirinale, Rome (c. 1525).

Maturino da Firenze (1490–1528) was an Italian painter, who was born in Florence, but worked in Rome during the Renaissance.

Vasari described the relationship between Polidoro da Caravaggio and Maturino as exceedingly close:

In that age of gold, as we may well call the happy age of Leo X, among the most noble minds Polidoro da Caravaggio has an honourable place. He came to Rome about the time when the loggie of the Pope's palace were being built under the direction of Raffaello, and until he was eighteen years of age was employed in carrying the bricklayer's hod for the builders. But when the painting began Polidoro's desires turned to painting, and he made himself intimate with all the young men of talent that he might learn their method of working. But from among them all he chose for a companion Maturino, a Florentine, with whom he worked, taking so much pleasure in the art that in a few months he did things which astonished every one who had known him in his former condition. And the love of Maturino for Polidoro, and Polidoro's for Maturino, grew so strong that they resolved to live and die together like brothers, having their work and money in common.

Vasari did not distinguish between the two painters in the joint works of Polidoro and Maturino. Dr. Evelina Borea, in her recent study on Polidoro, considers the contribution of the Florentine painter, Maturino, to be minimal.

Most sources say he died ca.1528, but some say he was killed in the Sack of Rome the previous year.
