= Polidoro da Caravaggio =

Italian painter

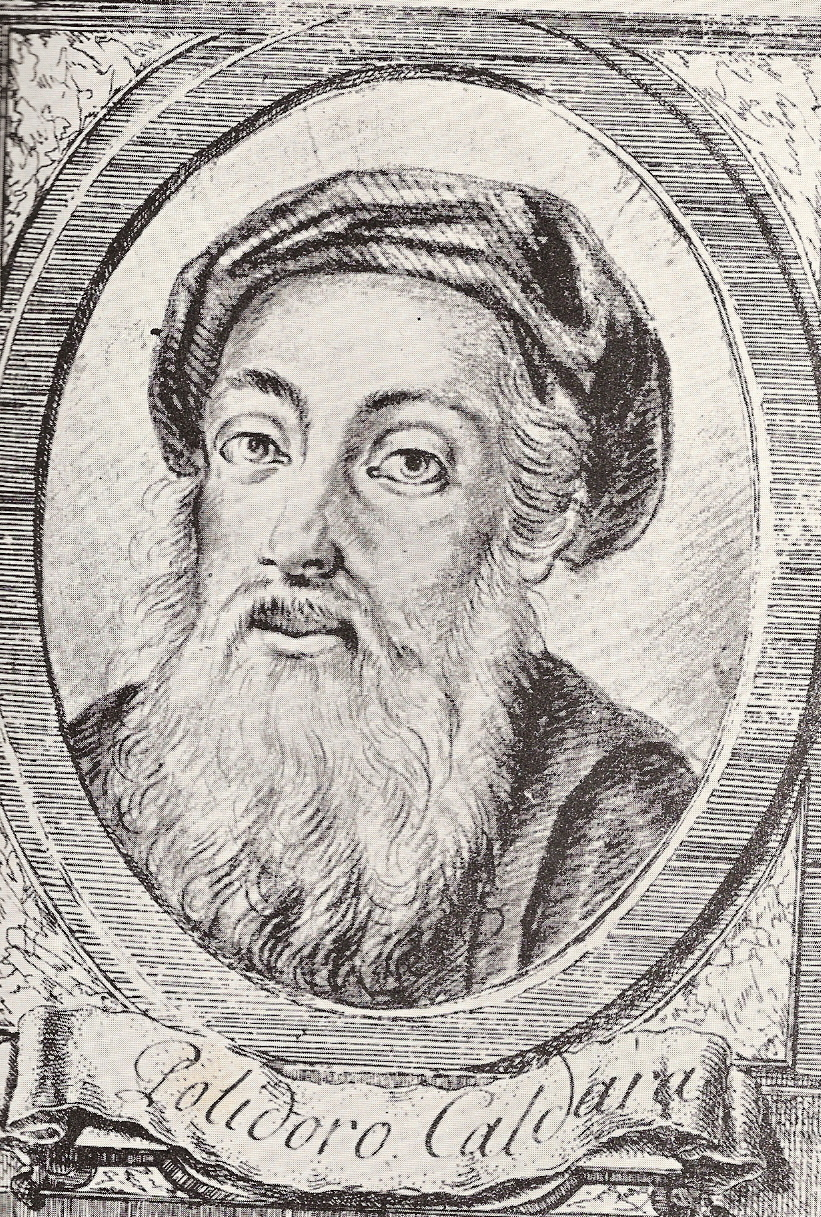
Polidoro Caldara

Polidoro Caldara, usually known as Polidoro da Caravaggio (c. 1499 – 1543), was an Italian painter of the Mannerist period, "arguably the most gifted and certainly the least conventional of Raphael's pupils", who was best known for his now-vanished paintings on the facades of Roman houses. He was unrelated to the later painter Michelangelo Merisi da Caravaggio, usually known just as Caravaggio, but both came from the town of Caravaggio.

== Life and work ==
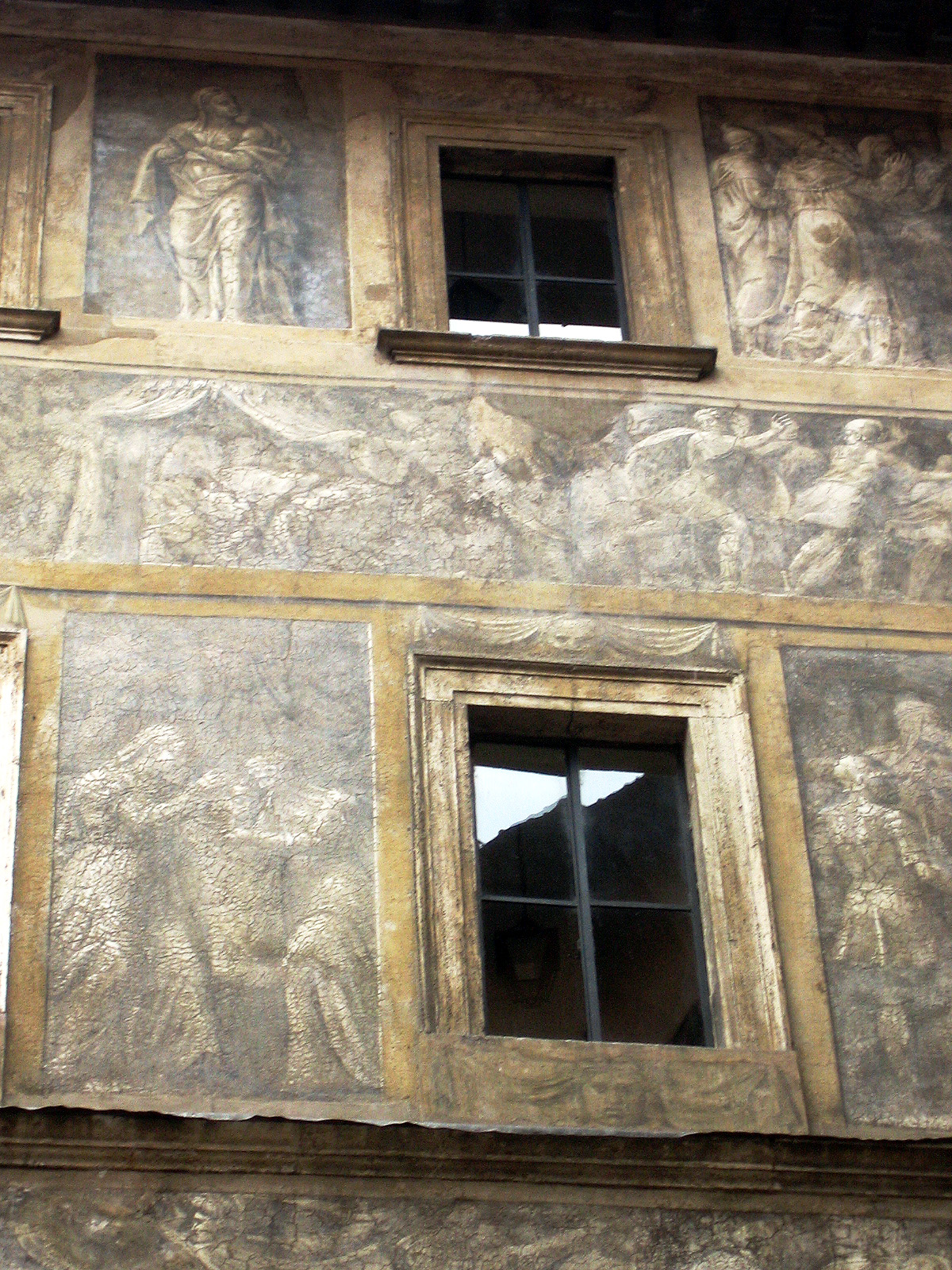
Palazzo Massimo Istoriato; a fading palace facade in Rome by Polidoro and Maturino, 1523.

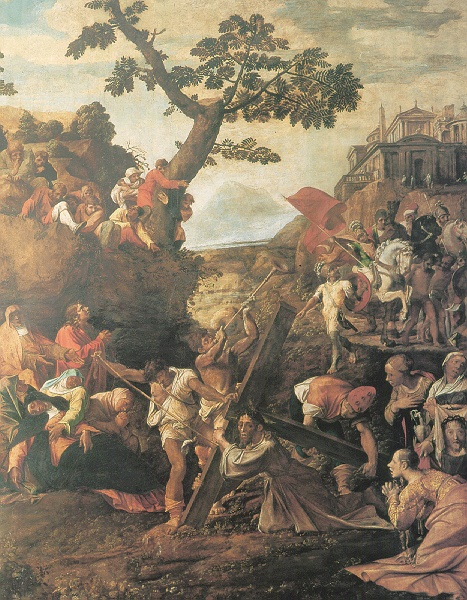
Christ Carrying the Cross (1530–34), Naples

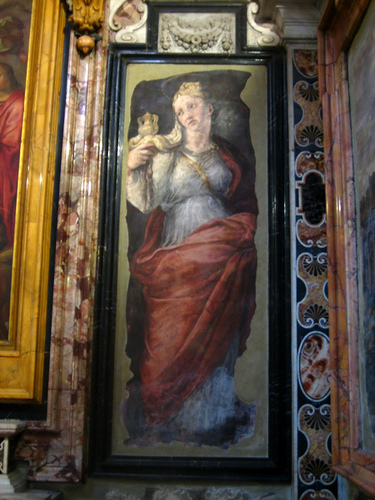
Mary Magdalene by Polidoro da Caravaggio and Maturino da Firenze, in S. Silvestro al Quirinale, Rome (c. 1525)

Polidoro Caldara was born in Caravaggio, in what is now Lombardy. According to Vasari, whilst working as a labourer carrying the materials for the builders of the Vatican logge he ingratiated himself with the artists, and attracted the admiration of Maturino da Firenze, one of Raphael's main assistants in the ongoing decoration of the Vatican. He then joined Raphael's large workshop, in about 1517, and worked on the Raphael Rooms in the Vatican. He and Maturino then set up as painters of palace facades, usually in sgraffito, with considerable success until the sack of Rome by the army of Charles V under the command of Constable de Bourbon in 1527, in which Maturino was killed. Polidoro fled to Naples, and from there to Messina, where he was very successful. According to tradition, he was about to return from there to the mainland of Italy when he was robbed and murdered by an assistant, Tonno Calabrese, in 1543.

In the second half of the sixteenth century his tomb in Messina (inside Carmine Maggiore, with the tomb of Constantine Lascaris) was totally destroyed during the repression of the Counter-Reformation.

Polidoro's main paintings include a Crucifixion, painted in Messina, and a Deposition of Christ (1527) and a Christ Carrying the Cross (1530–34) both in the Museo di Capodimonte of Naples, who have the best collection of his work (an oil sketch for the latter is in the National Gallery, London). They are very individual in style, extremely free in technique, and powerful in expression. The Christ bearing the Cross shows considerable Northern influence, probably reflecting the traditionally strong links between Sicily and the Netherlands.

His other works, as well as those of his partner, Maturino da Firenze, have mostly perished from exposure, as most were external decorations on the facades of palaces, but are known from many etchings by Pietro Santi Bartoli, Cherubino Alberti and others. One of his pupils is Deodato Guinaccia. They were authors of the facade decoration in classicising Graffito, usually in grisaille, of several Roman houses, like those ones in Borgo and in Parione (near Santa Maria della Pace and in Via del Pellegrino). A series of nine small internal wood panels from an unknown palace, perhaps in Naples, of which eight are now in the English Royal Collection, and one in the Louvre, give an idea of the liveliness and quality of these lost works: "Polidoro learned from Raphael the idea of re-creating the decoration of classical antiquity; but he did so with a wit, freedom and spirit of his own". Being always visible to the public, whilst they lasted the palace facades were very well known and influential, and used by "generations of young artists ... as a visual textbook". There are also many surviving drawings of high quality.

== Assassination ==
According to Vasari, Polidoro was firmly resolved to return to Rome after completing significant projects in Messina. In order to make preparations for this trip, he withdrew all of his savings from the bank for the trip to Rome. Upon discovering this, one of Polidoro's workmen, along with several accomplices, resolved to put the master to death the following night, and then to divide the money among themselves. On the following night, they set upon Polidoro while he was slumbering deeply, and strangled him with a cloth. Then, giving him several wounds, they made sure of his death; After a period of many days when no perpetrator was discovered, it was thought that no one except the workman could have committed the act. Upon receiving intelligence of the assistant's alleged involvement, he was captured on the authority of the Count of Messina, and tortured until he confessed to the crime. Shortly thereafter, he was sentenced to the gallows, torn with red-hot pincers, and quartered.

== Legacy ==
Among Polidoro's pupils in Messina was Deodato Guinaccia, Stefano Giordano, Mariano Riccio, Antonello Riccio, Jacopo Vignerio, and Alfonso Lazzaro.

== Gallery ==
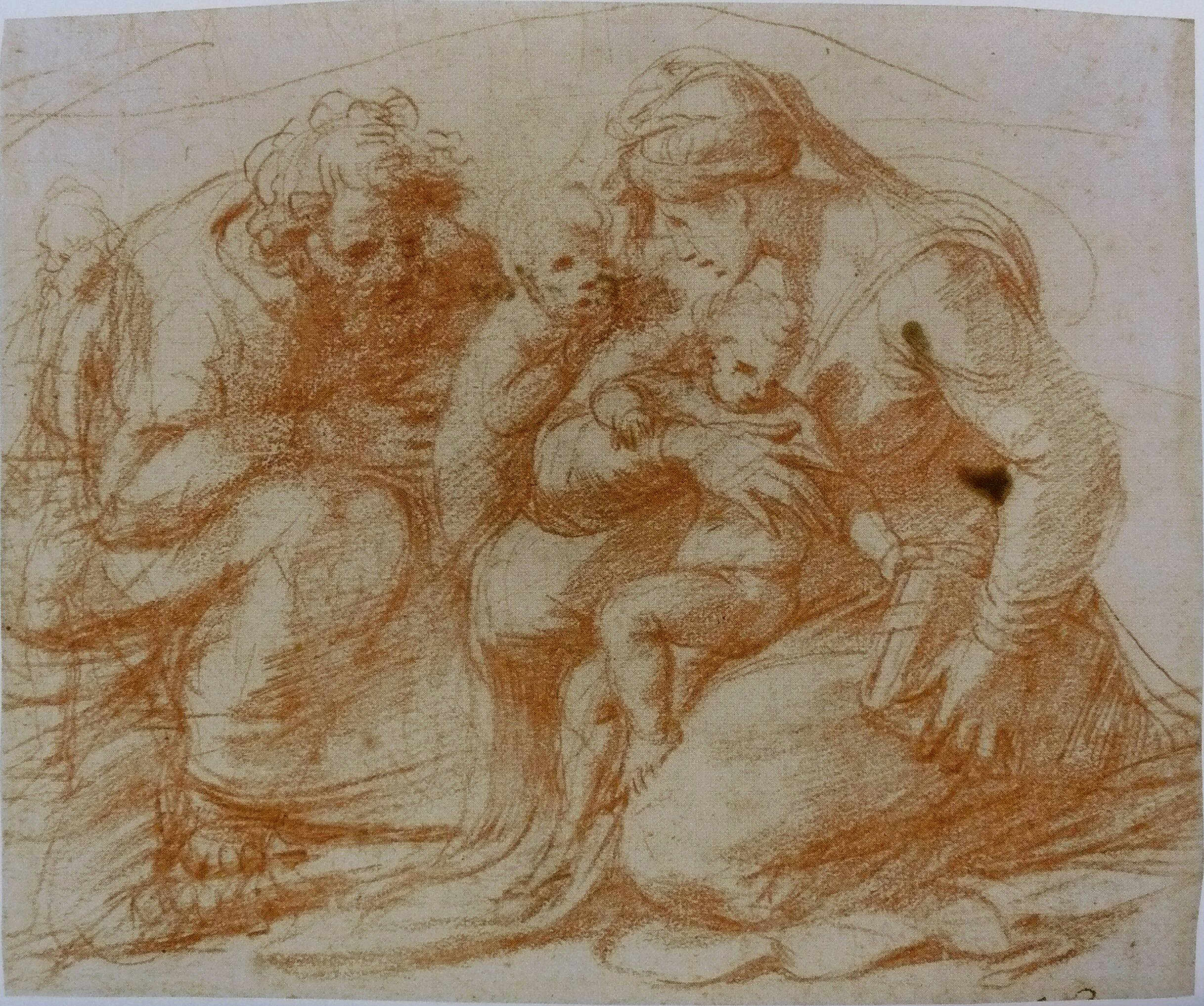
Red chalk drawing of the Holy Family.

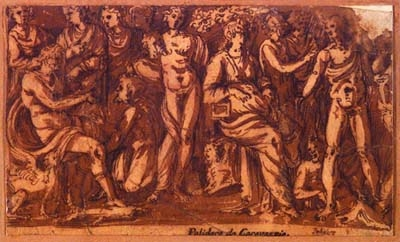
Assembly of Gods Lavis by Polidoro da Caravaggio, c. 1524. Probably study for the decoration of the Rota palace in Naples.

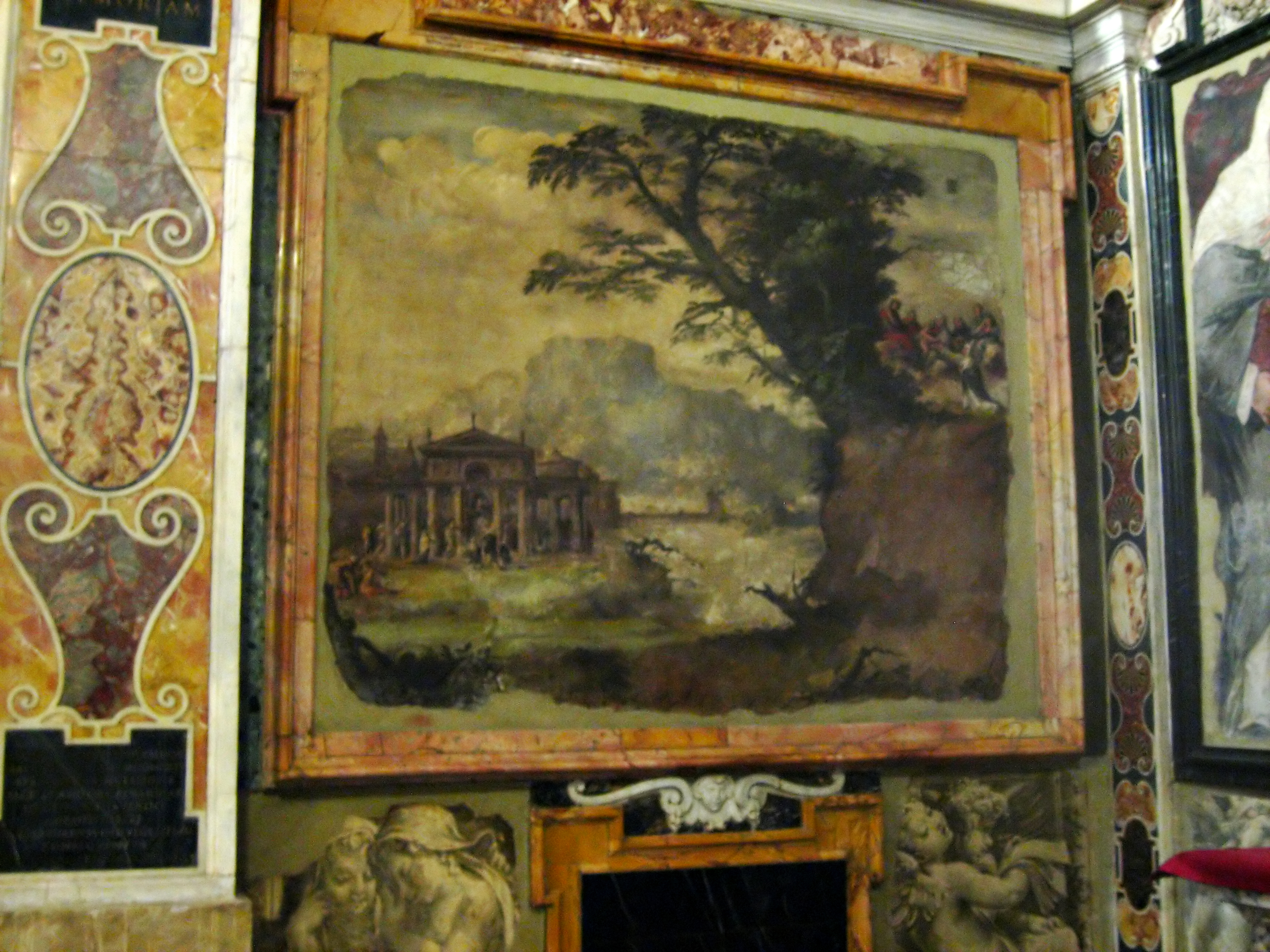
Landscape by Polidoro da Caravaggio and Maturino da Firenze, in S. Silvestro al Quirinale, Rome (c. 1525)

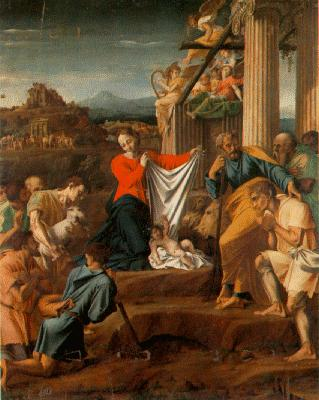
Adoration of the Shepherds, Messina

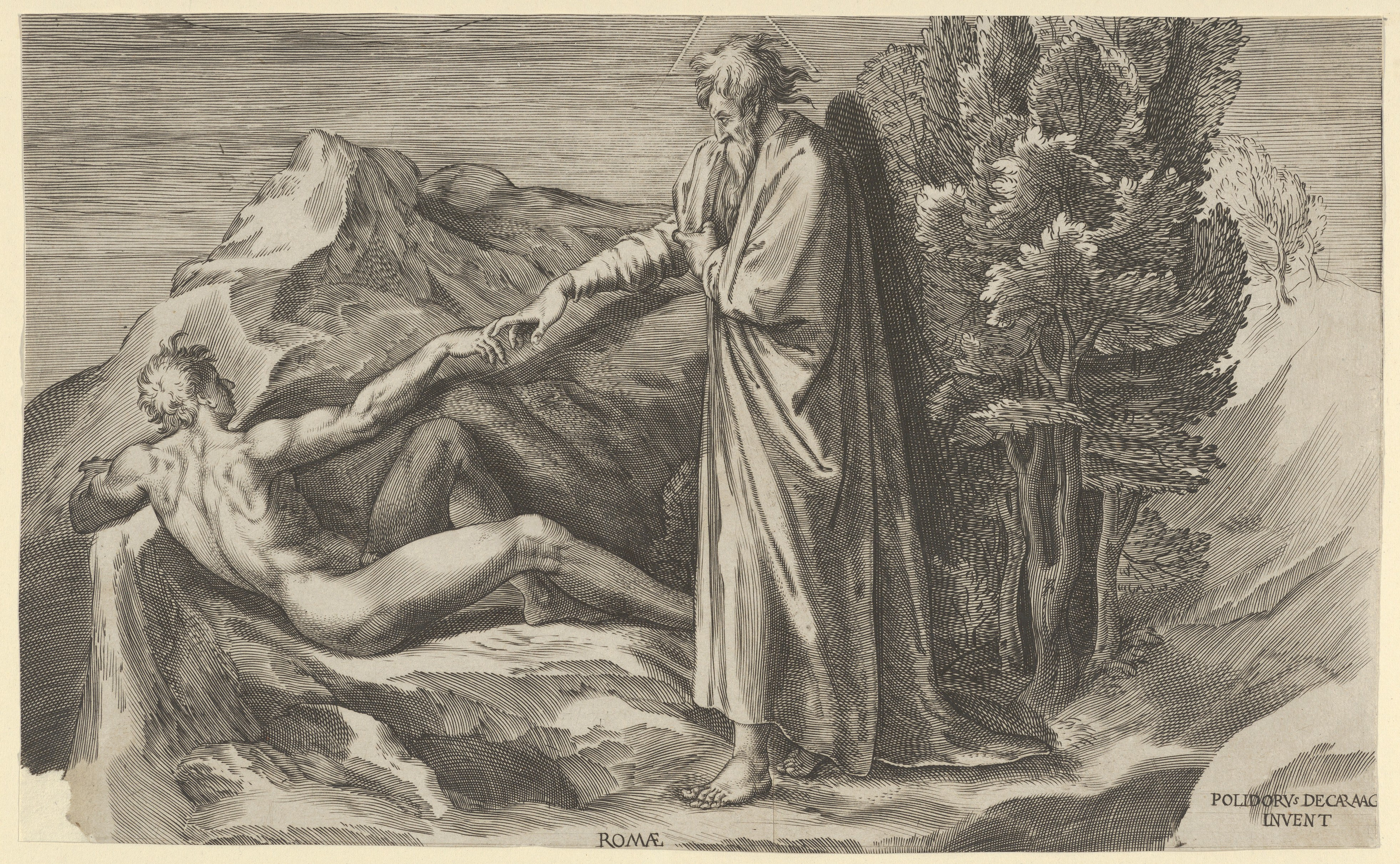
The Creation of Adam who reclines at left and touching the hand of God, Metropolitan Museum of Art

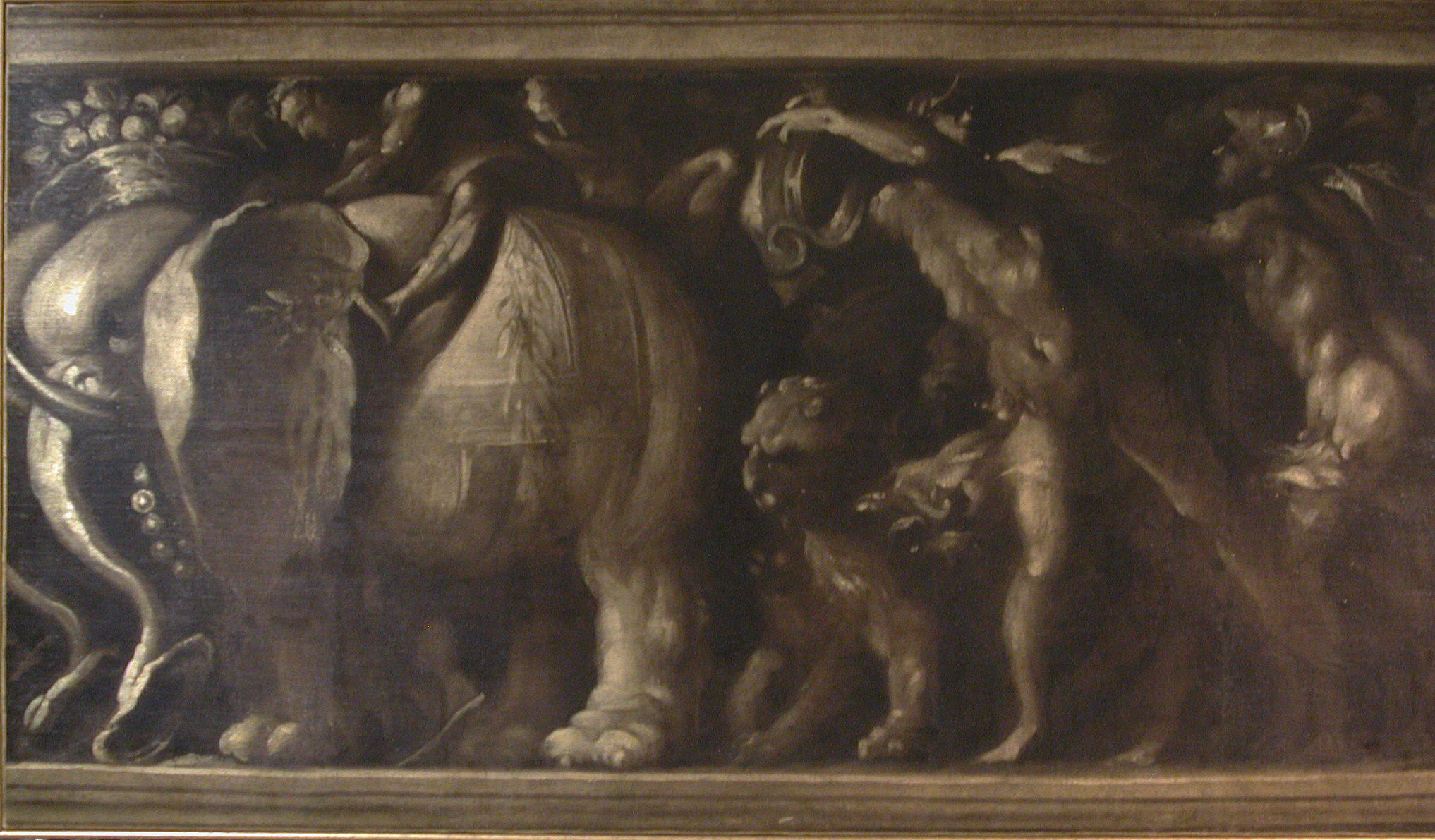
Military procession, MET

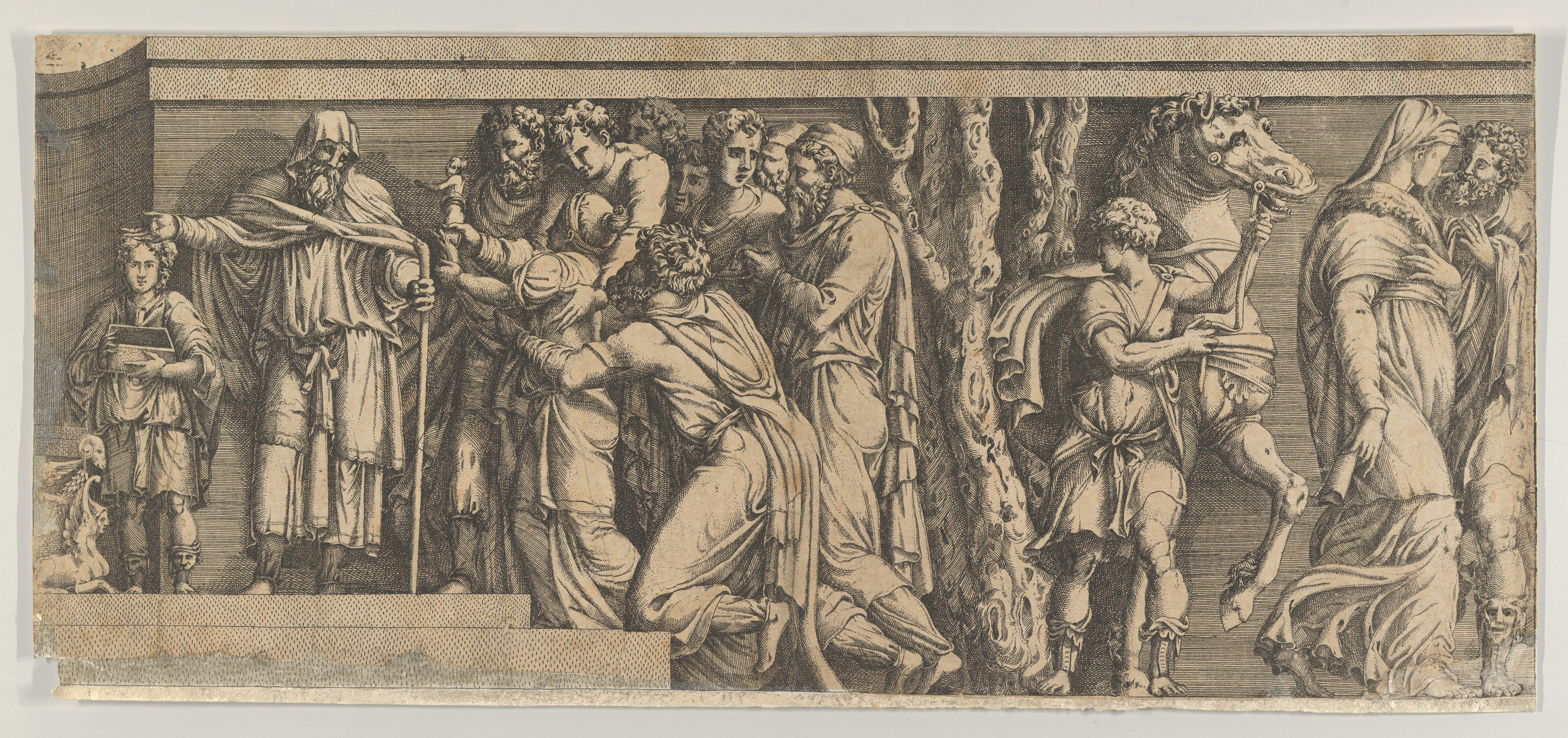
Statue of Niobe and her Worshippers, with Apollo and Diana and other Figures, MET
