= Mozzanica =

- Comune
- Comune di Mozzanica
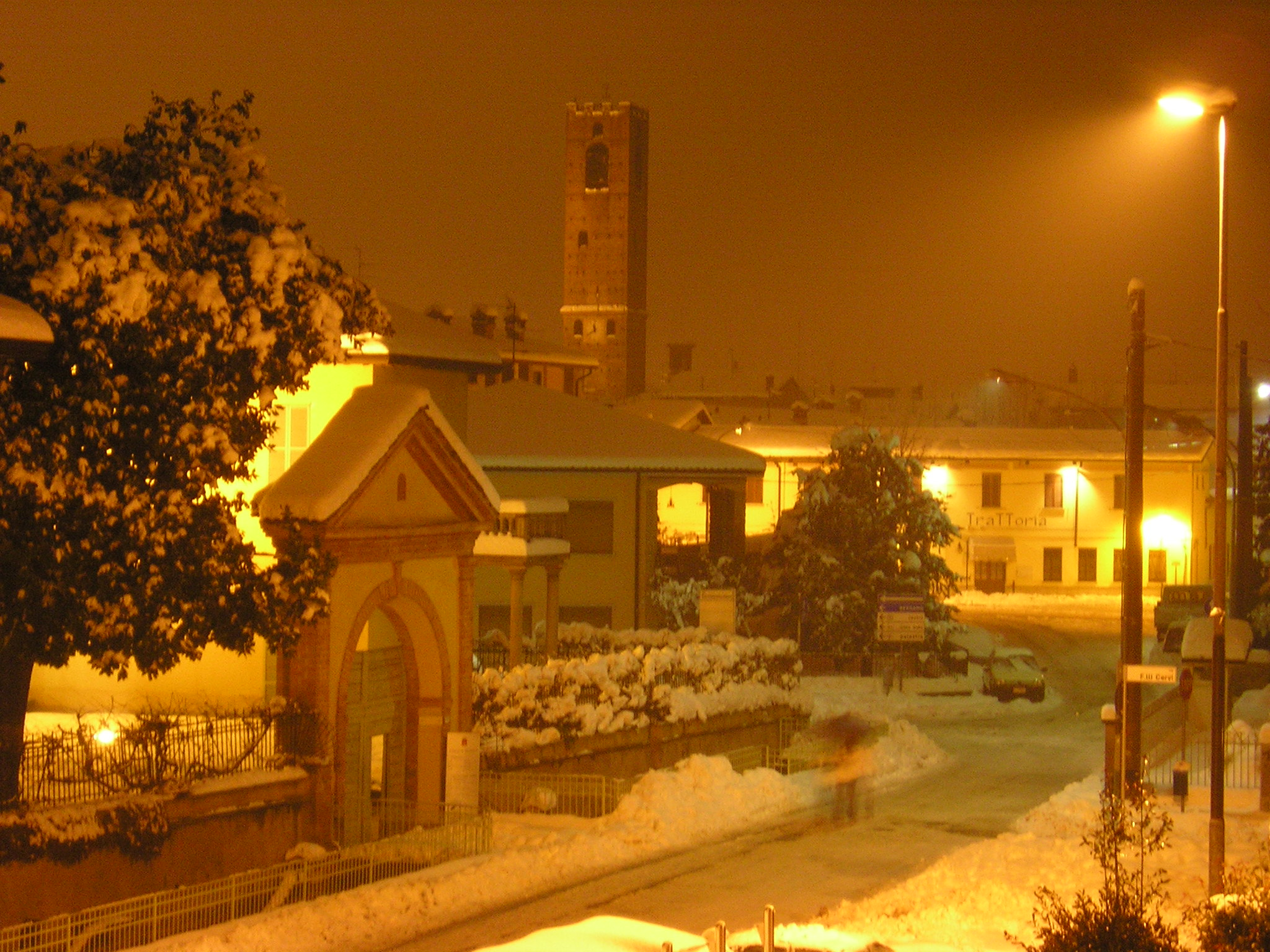

- Coat of arms

- Location within Italy Location within Lombardy
- Coordinates: 45°29′N 9°41′E
- Country: Italy
- Region: Lombardy
- Province: Bergamo (BG)
- Frazioni: Colomberone

Government
  - Mayor: Bruno Tassi

Area
  - Total: 9.46 km^{2} (3.65 sq mi)
- Elevation: 102 m (335 ft)

Population (30 November 2017)
  - Total: 4,552
  - Density: 481/km^{2} (1,250/sq mi)
- Demonym: Mozzanichesi
- Time zone: UTC+1 (CET)
  - Summer (DST): UTC+2 (CEST)
- Postal code: 24050
- Dialing code: 0363
- Patron saint: St. Stephen
- Saint day: Fourth Sunday in September
- Website: Official website

Mozzanica (Bergamasque: Musànega) is a comune (municipality) in the Province of Bergamo in the Italian region of Lombardy, located about 40 kilometres (25 mi) east of Milan and about 25 kilometres (16 mi) south of Bergamo.

Mozzanica borders the following municipalities: Caravaggio, Castel Gabbiano, Fara Olivana con Sola, Fornovo San Giovanni, Sergnano.

Mozzanica is the location of a Rohm and Haas plant. Located there is a 42-metre-tall (138 ft) tower, built by Ludovico Sforza in 1492, on the nearby frontier with the Republic of Venice.
