= Visconti Rocca (Romano di Lombardia) =

Castle in northern Italy

- Rocca Viscontea di Romano di Lombardia
- Romano di Lombardia, Bergamo, Lombardy, Italy
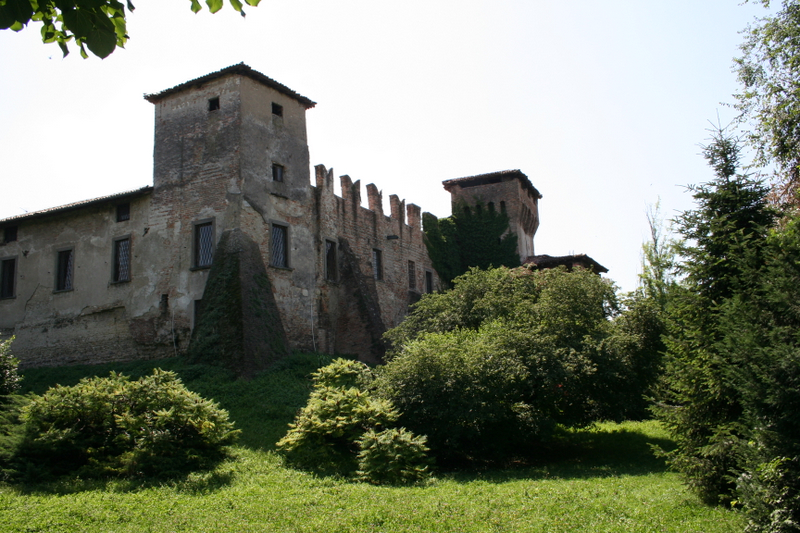
- The Rocca from the north

Site information
- Type: Rocca
- Owner: Romano di Lombardia municipality
- Open to the public: Yes
- Condition: Good

Location
- Coordinates: 45°31′16″N 9°45′12″E

Site history
- Built: 13th–15th centuries
- Built by: Unknown, reinforced by Azzone Visconti and Colleoni family
- Materials: Stone, cobblestone and bricks

The Visconti Rocca of Romano is a rocca in Romano di Lombardia, Bergamo, Lombardy in Northern Italy. It was built in the 13th century and expanded in the 14th and 15th centuries by the Visconti and Colleoni families.

== History ==
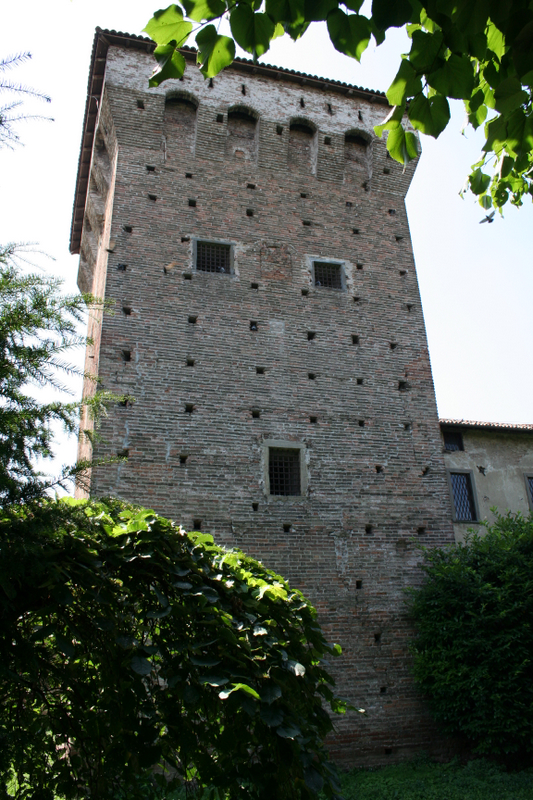
The north-eastern tower

The first castle was built in the 13th century at the north-western corner of the fortified village of Romano. The historical documents already mentioned it as La Rocca. It had a quadrangular plan with an internal courtyard and was surrounded by a large moat connected to the town's walls. Its original layout has remained substantially unchanged until today.

In the first half of the 14th century, Azzone Visconti, lord of Milan, strengthened the castle. He added two other towers to the single tower of the south-eastern corner at the north-eastern and south-western corners. In 1428, when Romano passed under the Venetian rule, the towers were equipped with protruding apparatus. Bartolomeo Colleoni, who became lord of Romano in 1448 as supreme commander of the Venice troops, transformed the southern wing of the castle and created a large reception room (the Sala Grande) on the first floor of the western wing. He also raised the external loggia on the side of the south-western tower. During the 17th century, a new tower was added at the north-western corner.

The walls of the primitive castle are partly built with river pebbles arranged in a herringbone pattern or mixed with brick courses. The towers of the Visconti era are made entirely in brick. The main entrance is on the eastern side, from the city. A drawbridge over the moat was replaced in 1803 by a bridge in masonry, but its traces are still visible. A secondary entrance, towards the countryside, was inserted in the south-eastern tower.

At the beginning of the 20th century, the building served as the district court and prison. In 1969, the Municipality of Romano began its restoration.

== Today ==
Today, the Rocca is the seat of the municipal library and the Parco del Serio. The Sala Grande hosts exhibitions and events.

== Sources ==
- Conti, Flavio; Hybsch, Vincenzo; Vincenti, Antonello (1993). I castelli della Lombardia. Provincie di Bergamo e Brescia (in Italian). Novara: Istituto Geografico de Agostini. ISBN 88-415-0161-8.
