= Our Lady of Caravaggio =

1432 purported Marian apparition in Caravaggio, Italy

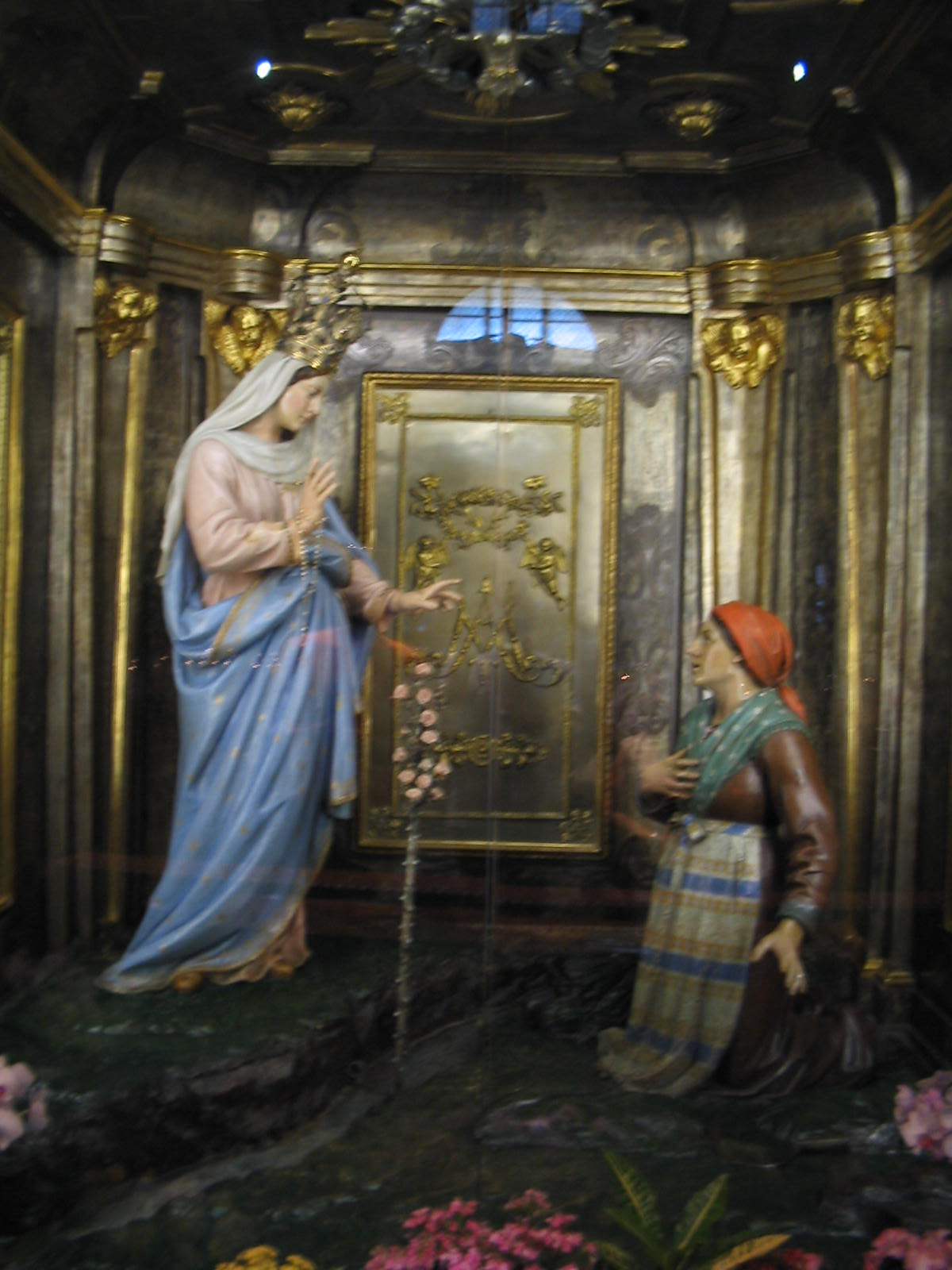
The venerated Marian image, crowned by Pope Clement XI via Pontifical decree through the Bishop of Cremona, Carlo Ottaviano Guaschi on 30 September 1710.

Our Lady of the Fountain in Caravaggio (Italian: La Madonna del Fonte di Caravaggio) is a purported Marian apparition of the Blessed Virgin Mary at Caravaggio, Lombardy, Italy in 26 May 1432.

The famed shrine is piously known for the purported foot imprint of the Madonna and the revelation of a water fountain, which serves as the main veneration for its religious devotees.

Pope Clement XI granted a decree of Pontifical coronation towards the site on 10 September 1710. Pope Pius X raised her shrine to the status of Minor Basilica via the Pontifical decree Templa Dei Antiqua on 7 May 1906. The decree was signed and notarized by Cardinal Luigi Macchi.

== History ==
The apparition was reported by Giovannette, daughter of Pietro Vaccli and wife of Francesco Varoli. She said that on 26 May 1432, Mary appeared in a field in Caravaggio, in Northern Italy, in the region of Milan; and said that her Son was angry, that for him people should fast on Fridays and for her they should celebrate Saturdays after vespers.

The Virgin Mary announced peace to Giovannette in her family, among the neighboring warring states and reconciliation between the Church in the East and West, through the Council of Florence (1436–1445). As proof of her Marian apparition, the Virgin left the imprint of her feet on the stone where she stood. A spring of water sprung forth from under the stone, purported to be miraculous.

Eventually a modest shrine was built at the place of the apparition thanks to the Duke of Milan, Filippo Maria Visconti. In 1575, Charles Borromeo hired the architect, Pellegrinio Pellegrinis to enlarge the sanctuary. The Madonna di Caravaggio, or "del Fonte", is now an enormous shrine.

In the sixteenth, seventeenth, and eighteenth centuries, it inspired a number of satellite shrines and some imitative visions. The sanctuary still exists and attracts many people.

Pope Clement XI granted a decree of Canonical Coronation towards the image. The coronation took place on 30 September 1710. It was decreed a Basilica by Pope Pius X in 1906.
