= Palazzo Massimo Istoriato =

Palazzo Massimo istoriato
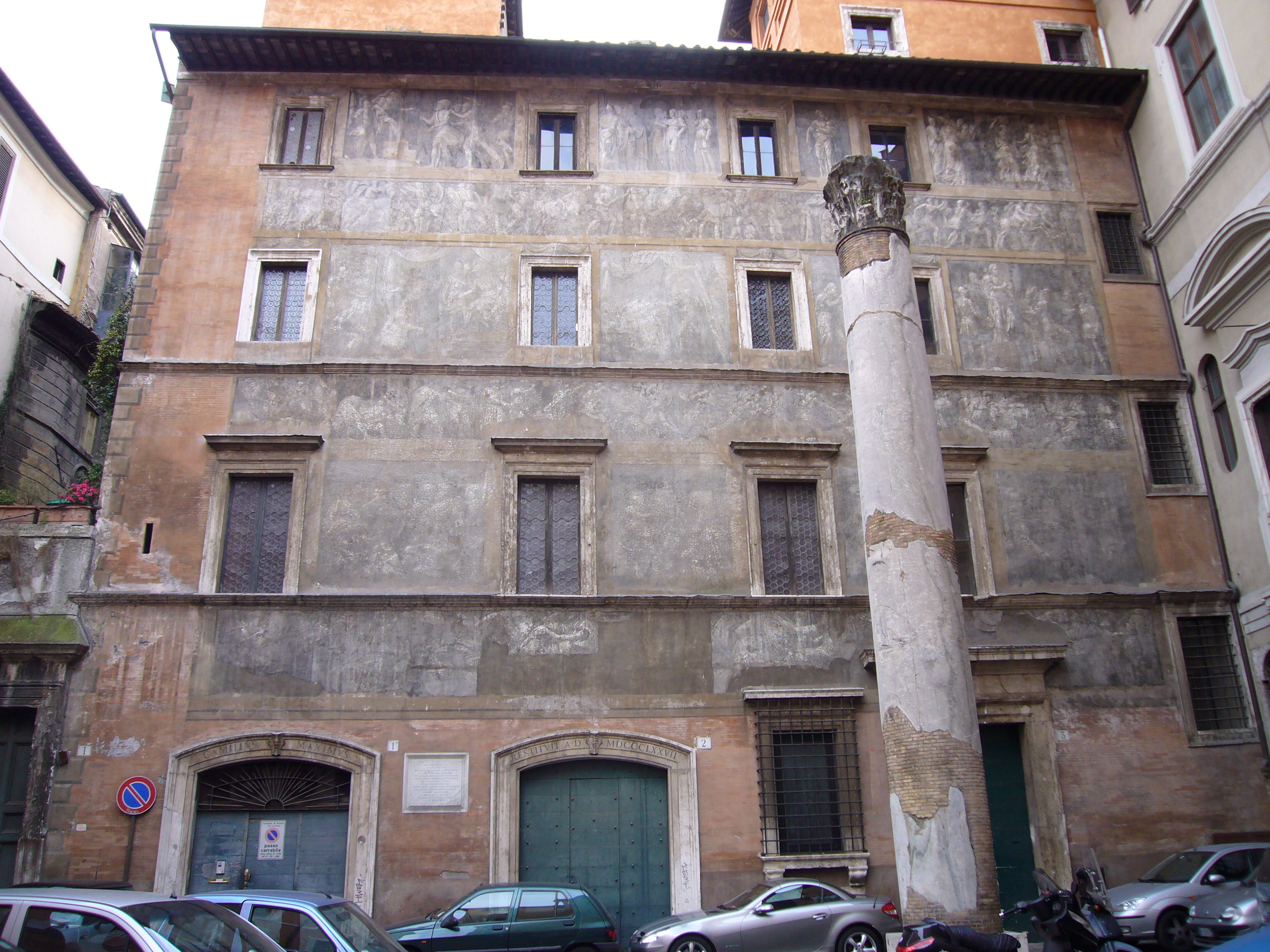
- Facade of the historiated Palazzo Massimo on Piazza dei Massimi
- Interactive map of the Palazzo Massimo istoriato area

General information
- Status: In use
- Type: Palace
- Architectural style: Mannerist
- Location: Rome, Lazio, Italy, Piazza dei Massimi.
- Coordinates: 41.897167°N 12.473556°E
- Construction started: 16th century

The Historiated Palazzo Massimo is a palace in Rome that today forms a single body with the Palazzo Massimo alle Colonne and the Palazzo Massimo detto di Pirro, but overlooks the Piazza dei Massimi behind it.

== History and description ==
The whole building complex is built on the remains of the Odeon of Domitian: it is from there that the monolithic column, found in 1938 and erected in 1950, comes from, placed in the centre of the small square, singularly quiet although it is immediately behind Piazza Navona.

The Palazzo Massimo known as the Palace of Pyrrhus derives its name from a statue of the god Mars found in the foundation excavations and mistakenly believed to be a depiction of the leader Pyrrhus, king of Epirus, defeated by the Romans in 275 BC near Beneventum.

Damaged by the Lansquenets during the Sack of Rome in 1527, the palace was partially rebuilt after 1532 by Giovanni Mangone, a pupil of Antonio da Sangallo il Giovane. The Palazzo Massimo istoriato, briefly Palazzo istoriato, obtained its name because it was decorated with frescoes with stories from antiquity, along the entire façade, probably by Daniele da Volterra in the 16th century, to celebrate the wedding of Angelo Massimo, who commissioned the reconstruction of the palace, with Antonietta Planca Incoronati.

One must bear in mind, when observing this architectural ensemble and evaluating its apparent eccentricity, that the layout of Corso Vittorio Emanuele – on which today stands Palazzo Massimo alle Colonne – and that of Corso Rinascimento were built after the unification of Italy, demolishing much of the area's medieval and Renaissance urban fabric, and profoundly altering its architectural barycentres.

The monochrome façade was restored, as an inscription indicates, in 1877 and several times in the 20th century.

The ground floor may have housed one of Rome's first typographies, opened by two German printers, Conrad Schweynheym and Arnold Pannartz. Hailing from Subiaco (70 km east of Rome), where they had worked in the years 1465–67, they were given hospitality by the princes Massimo. The printing house began its activity by publishing, in the same 1467, the De civitate Dei by St. Augustine. In six years as many as 12,475 volumes were published.
