= Fornovo San Giovanni =

- Comune
- Comune di Fornovo San Giovanni
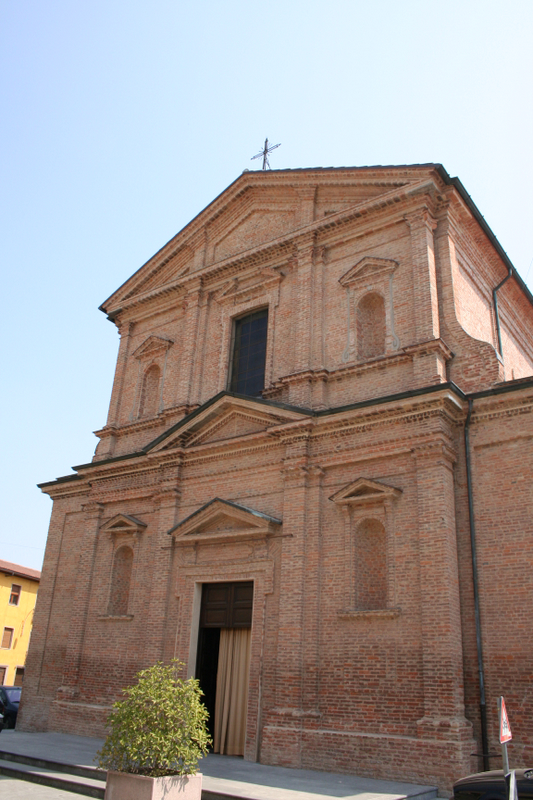
- Parish church of Fornovo San Giovanni.

- Coat of arms

- Location within Italy Location within Lombardy
- Coordinates: 45°30′N 9°41′E
- Country: Italy
- Region: Lombardy
- Province: Bergamo (BG)

Government
  - Mayor: Giancarlo Piana

Area
  - Total: 7.04 km^{2} (2.72 sq mi)
- Elevation: 109 m (358 ft)

Population (31 May 2021)
  - Total: 3,364
  - Density: 478/km^{2} (1,240/sq mi)
- Demonym: Fornovesi
- Time zone: UTC+1 (CET)
  - Summer (DST): UTC+2 (CEST)
- Postal code: 24040
- Dialing code: 0363
- Patron saint: St. John the Baptist
- Saint day: 24 June
- Website: Official website

Fornovo San Giovanni (Bergamasque: Fùrnof) is a comune (municipality) in the Province of Bergamo in the Italian region of Lombardy, located in the Gera d'Adda, about 40 kilometres (25 mi) east of Milan and about 20 kilometres (12 mi) south of Bergamo.

Fornovo San Giovanni borders the following municipalities: Bariano, Caravaggio, Fara Olivana con Sola, Mozzanica, Romano di Lombardia.
