= Daniele Riccio =

Italian engineer

Daniele Riccio of the Università di Napoli Federico II, Napoli, Italy, was named Fellow of the Institute of Electrical and Electronics Engineers (IEEE) in 2014 for contributions to satellite-based synthetic aperture radar imaging.
