= Dennis Riccio =

American football and wrestling coach

Biographical details
- Born: c. 1946

Playing career

Football
- 1964–1966: Illinois State
- Position: Linebacker

Coaching career (HC unless noted)

Football
- 1979–1982: Augustana (IL) (assistant)
- 1983–1986: Augustana (IL) (DC)
- 1987–1991: Frostburg State
- 1992–1997: St. Lawrence

Wrestling
- 1979–1987: Augustana (IL)

Head coaching record
- Overall: 42–62 (football); 63–56–3 (wrestling)

Dennis Riccio (born c. 1946) is an American former football and wrestling coach. He served as the head football coach at Frostburg State University in Frostburg, Maryland 1987 to 1991 and at St. Lawrence University in Canton, New York from 1992 to 1997, compiling a career college football record of 42–62. It should be noted he set a record for losses at St. Lawrence and was widely unpopular. Before his stint at Frostburg State, Riccio was the defensive coordinator at Augustana College in Rock Island, Illinois under head coach Bob Reade from 1983 to 1986, during which time the Augustana Vikings won four consecutive NCAA Division III Football Championships. Ricco played college football at Illinois State University as a linebacker from 1964 to 1966. Riccio also wrestled at Illinois State. He moved to Augusta in 1979 to become head wrestling coach and assistant football coach. He served as head wrestling coach there from 1979 to 1987, tallying a record of 63–56–3.

== Head coaching record ==
=== Football ===
Year	Team	Overall	Conference	Standing	Bowl/playoffs
Frostburg State Bobcats (NCAA Division III independent) (1987–1991)
1987	Frostburg State	2–8			
1988	Frostburg State	4–6			
1989	Frostburg State	9–1			
1990	Frostburg State	9–1			
1990	Frostburg State	7–3			
Frostburg State:		31–19			
St. Lawrence Saints (NCAA Division III independent) (1992–1994)
1992	St. Lawrence	3–6			
1993	St. Lawrence	2–8			
1994	St. Lawrence	0–9			
St. Lawrence Saints (Upstate Collegiate Athletic Association) (1995–1997)
1995	St. Lawrence	2–6	1–3		
1996	St. Lawrence	2–7	1–3	4th	
1997	St. Lawrence	2–7	1–3	4th	
St. Lawrence:		11–43	3–9		
Total:		42–62			
