= Mariano Riccio =

Italian painter

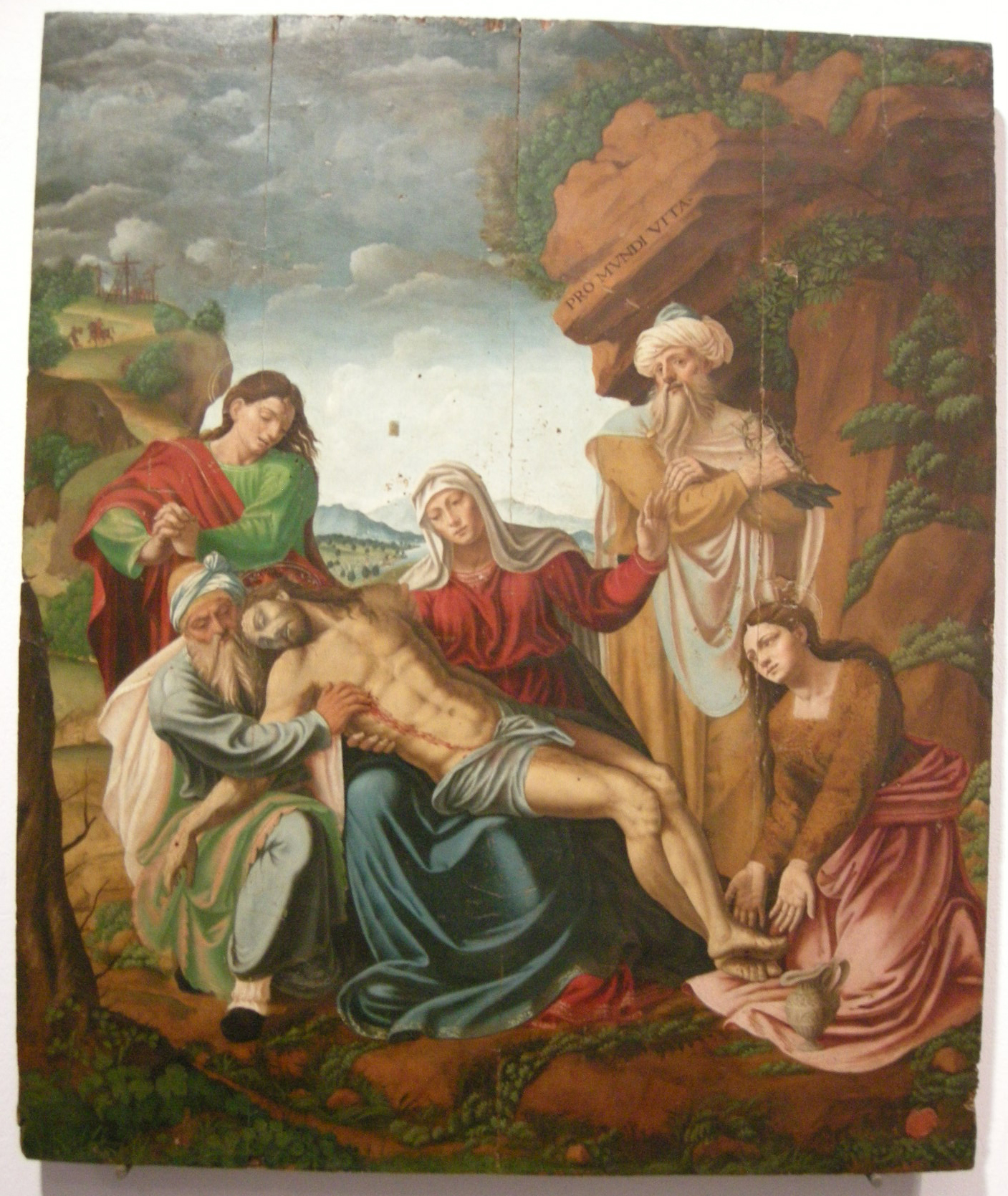
Mariano Riccio, Pieta of the Converted, oil on canvas, 182 x 152 cm. Regional Museum of Messina

Mariano Riccio (born 1510) was an Italian painter of the Renaissance period.

He was born in Messina and painted altarpieces. He was a pupil of Franco, and afterwards of Polidoro da Caravaggio, whose style he successfully imitated. His son, Antonello Riccio, was also a painter.
