= Bill Riccio =

American neo-Nazi

Bill Riccio (aka William E. Davidson) is a leader in the white power skinhead movement in the United States who gained public notoriety for his appearance in the 1993 documentary Skinheads: Soldiers of the Race War. He has been convicted numerous times on illegal weapon possession charges, the most recent of which was in 1992.

== Activism ==
Riccio was the organizer of the Aryan Youth Front, a Birmingham, Alabama white power skinhead group composed of mostly male teenagers, many of them runaways. According to the Southern Poverty Law Center, Riccio "systemically indoctrinated them in racial hatred and his own special brand of neo-Confederate Hitler worship." Two of Riccio's followers committed at least two murders in Alabama, one of which was the April 1992 fatal beating of a homeless man under a railroad trestle, hours after they had attended a birthday party at the War House for Adolf Hitler.

The group had originally been called White Aryan Resistance. Although he later changed it to avoid confusion with another group of the same name, he continued to call the house he rented as the organization's headquarters and social gathering place the "WAR House". He funded the War House with his small auto parts business.

Riccio also led a network of white supremacists in Alabama, Florida and Georgia, working closely with the Confederate Hammerskins, and attracting followers from as far away as Pennsylvania. In November 1991, he and Alabama Ku Klux Klan (KKK) leader Roger Handley co-hosted a large gathering on Handley's farm, and co-organized a white power march by 150 of their members through downtown Birmingham in June 1992.

Riccio came to public attention when he was profiled in the 1993 HBO America Undercover documentary Skinheads USA: Soldiers of the Race War, during which he explained that his goal was to reclaim the Southern United States as a haven for "pure Aryans". According to a 2006 report by the Southern Poverty Law Center, Riccio continues to attend KKK events with followers, including some of those who first joined his cause as teenagers.

== Legal troubles ==
In 1979, Riccio was convicted of possessing a sawed-off shotgun. In 1981 he was convicted of violating his probation by illegally possessing a firearm. In 1985, he was convicted of the same crime, along with possession of marijuana. On August 7, 1992, the War House was raided by police as part of a multi-state sweep of white supremacist groups. The discovery of guns and grenades on Riccio's property resulted in another arrest and conviction for illegal weapons possession, with the judge who sentenced him commenting, "It is [Riccio's] apparent ability to organize and mobilize disenchanted young white males even to acts of violence that makes him dangerous."

After serving 15 months in prison, he returned to the War House, and became Imperial Kludd (national chaplain) of the North Georgia White Knights of the Ku Klux Klan. When KKK leader Roger Handley was later charged with sodomy with a teenaged boy, Riccio defended him, claiming the accusations were false, and part of a law enforcement defamation conspiracy.

In 2007 Ronnie Painter, a former member who lived with Bill Riccio at his war house and is now an inmate at Donaldson Correctional Facility in Bessemer, Alabama, described Riccio as a master manipulator who gave them drugs, exploited them emotionally and sexually. Riccio denied that he had had or tried to have sex with any of the boys who flocked to his home in the 1990s. "That's certainly not true in any sense of the word," Riccio said.

== See also ==
- Neo-Nazism
