= Caravaggio, Lombardy =

Town in Lombardy, Italy

Caravaggio Careàs (Lombard)
- Comune
- Città di Caravaggio
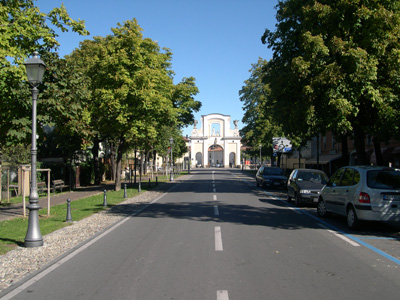
- The Porta Nuova gate to the historical centre.

- Coat of arms

- Location within Italy Location within Lombardy
- Coordinates: 45°30′N 09°39′E
- Country: Italy
- Region: Lombardy
- Province: Bergamo (BG)
- Frazioni: Masano, Vidalengo

Government
  - Mayor: Claudio Bolandrini

Area
  - Total: 32 km^{2} (12 sq mi)
- Elevation: 111 m (364 ft)

Population (30 April 2015)
  - Total: 16,045
  - Density: 500/km^{2} (1,300/sq mi)
- Demonym: Caravaggini
- Time zone: UTC+1 (CET)
  - Summer (DST): UTC+2 (CEST)
- Postal code: 24043
- Dialing code: 0363
- Patron saint: SS. Fermo and Rustico
- Saint day: 9 August
- Website: Official website

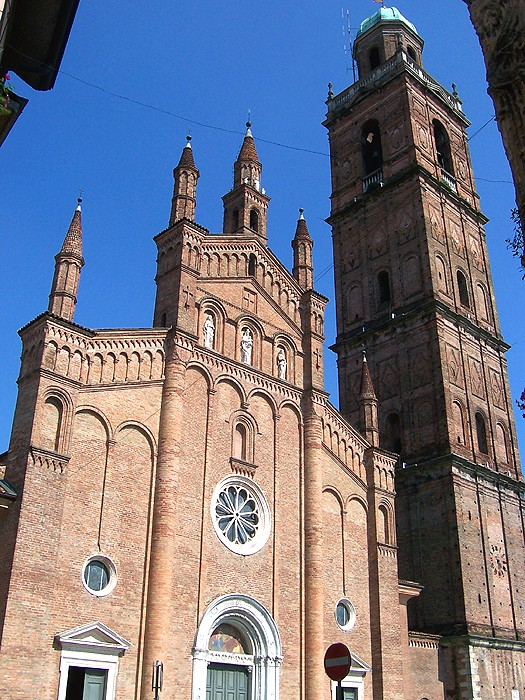
Church of San Fermo e Rustico

Caravaggio (Italian: [karaˈvaddʒo]; Bergamasque: Careàs [karɛˈas]) is a town and comune in the province of Bergamo, in Lombardy, Italy, located 40 kilometres (25 mi) east of Milan. It is the home town of the renaissance era artists Caravaggio and Polidoro da Caravaggio.

== History ==
The town received the honorary title of city with a presidential decree on December 22, 1954.

== Geography ==
Caravaggio borders with the municipalities of Bariano, Brignano Gera d'Adda, Calvenzano, Capralba (CR), Fornovo San Giovanni, Misano di Gera d'Adda, Morengo, Mozzanica, Sergnano (CR) and Treviglio. Its frazioni are Masano and Vidalengo.

== Main sights ==
The city is best known for the Sanctuary (15th century).

Other sights include:

- The Gallavresi Palace (or the Marchioness Palace), now the Town Hall. It dates to the second half of the 13th century.
- Church of San Fermo e Rustico, in Lombard-Gothic style, built in the 13th century over a pre-existing holy edifice. The two aisles were added in 1429. It has a façade in brickwork with a marble central portal, surmounted by a large rose window. It is flanked by a 76-metre (249 ft) high bell tower, built in 1500 by governor Giovanni Dandolo. The interior houses the Holy Sacrament Chapel (late 15th-early 16th century), in Bramantesque style, variously attributed to Giovanni Battagio; also present are works by Bernardino Campi, Giovanni Moriggia, Giulio Cesare Procaccini and Nicola Moietta.
- Church of Santa Liberata (16th century), with frescoes.
- Porta Nuova arch (18th century)
- Teatro Amerighi, named after the family of the painter Michelangelo Amerighi da Caravaggio, it was a theatre designed by the Liberty style architect Carlo Bedolini and built at the beginning of the 20th century. It has been probably the most important cultural and social spot of the city for decades before being destroyed at the end of the Second World War. In the area it was considered like a little Teatro alla Scala.

== People ==
- Giovanni Francesco Straparola, Renaissance writer and poet.
- Giovanni Mangone, 16th century architect and sculptor.
- Michelangelo Merisi o Amerighi da Caravaggio, Italian Baroque painter, who is named after the town.
- Polidoro da Caravaggio, Renaissance artist
- Riccardo Montolivo, footballer

== Transportation ==
Caravaggio has a railway station on the Treviglio–Cremona line.

== Twin towns ==
- Porto Ercole (Tuscany, Italy; since 1973)
- Valletta (Malta; since 2010)
