= Thomas Riccio =

Thomas Riccio may refer to:

- Thomas Riccio (auction owner), involved in the 2008 O. J. Simpson robbery case
- Thomas P. Riccio (born 1955), American multimedia artist and academic
