= Antonello Riccio =

Italian painter

Antonello Riccio (active 1576) was an Italian painter of the Renaissance period.

He was the son of the painter Mariano Riccio, whose style he imitated.
