= Cucchi =

Cucchi is an Italian surname. Notable people with the surname include:

- Cristiana Cucchi, Italian vocalist
- Éber Luís Cucchi, Brazilian footballer
- Enrico Cucchi, (1965–1996), Italian footballer
- Enzo Cucchi, Italian painter
- Francesco Cucchi (1834–1913), Italian patriot soldier
- Ilaria Cucchi (born 1974), Italian activist and politician, sister of Stefano
- Maurizio Cucchi (born 1945), Italian poet and writer
- Stefano Cucchi, Italian man, brother of Ilaria, whose death is the subject of On My Skin (2018 film)
