= Orto Botanico di Bergamo "Lorenzo Rota" =

Botanical garden in Italy

Coordinates: 45°42′28″N 9°39′28″E

The Orto Botanico di Bergamo "Lorenzo Rota" (1,357 m²) is a botanical garden located at the top of a long stairway from Scaletta di Colle Aperto, Bergamo, Lombardy, Italy. It is open daily during the warmer months.

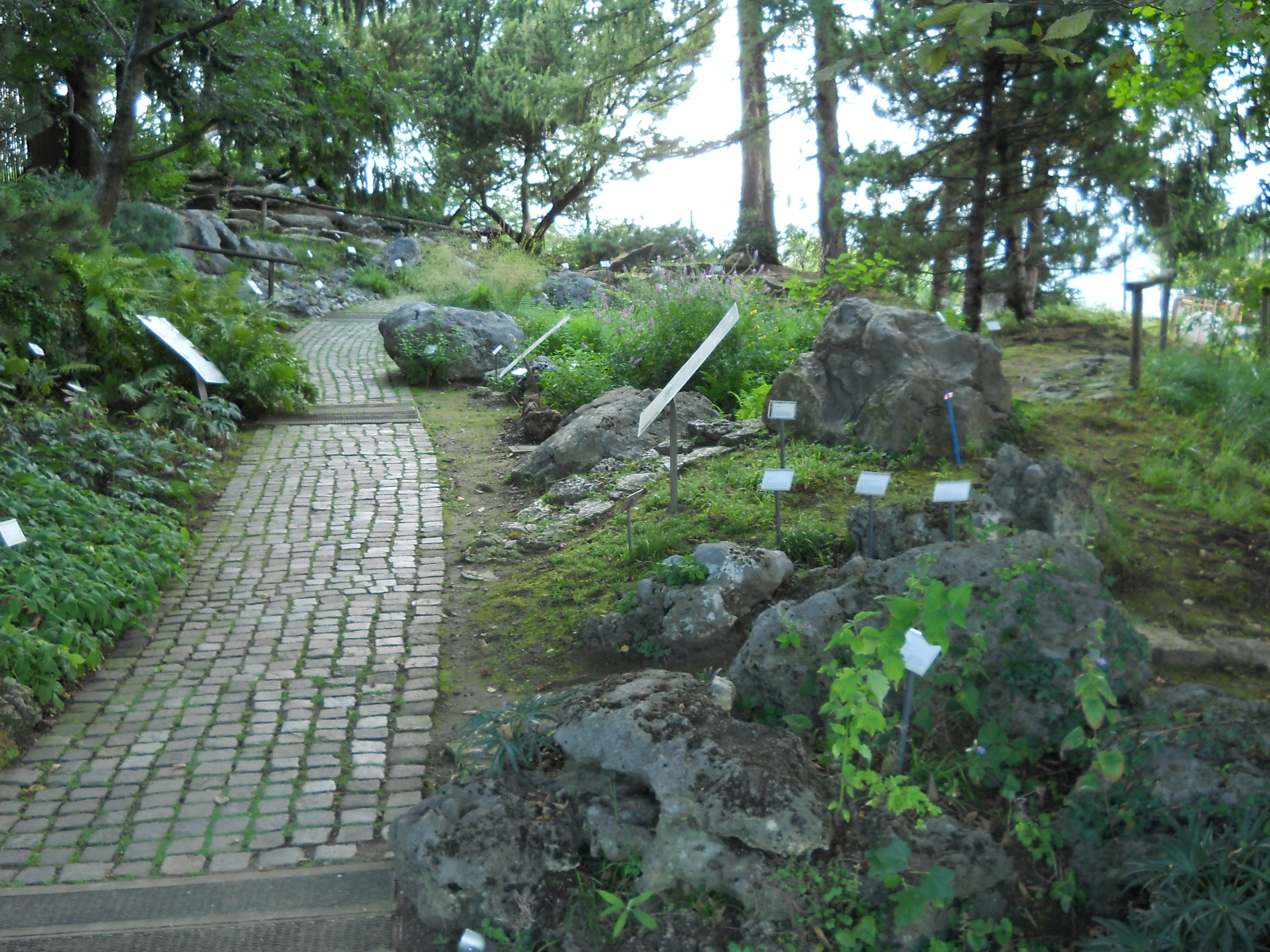

The garden was established in 1972, and named in honor of physician and botanist Lorenzo Rota. It was at first predominantly an alpine garden, but after 1989 began collaboration with the Museum of Natural Sciences and broadened its collection. In 1993, the garden became an integral part of the museum.

Although smaller than a soccer field, the garden now contains more than 900 species arranged into 23 collections, including:

- Alpine - Abies alba, Achnatherum calamagrostis, Alnus viridis, Carlina acaulis, Corydalis lutea, Dryas octopetala, Hieracium pilosella, Horminum pyrenaicum, Larix decidua, Pinus mugo, Rhamnus alpinus, Rhaponticum scariosum, Rhododendron hirsutum, Rubus idaeus, Picea abies, Potentilla grandiflora, Primula hirsuta, Primula auricula, Ranunculus thora, Saxifraga cotyledon, and Vaccinium myrtillus.
- Lombardy - more than half of the garden's species, including Allium ursinum, Arum italicum, Aruncus dioicus, Asarum europaeum, Betula pendula, Campanula elatinoides, Campanula raineri, Carex pendula, Carpinus betulus, Convallaria majalis, Daphne mezereum, Doronicum pardalianches, Erythronium dens-canis, Euphorbia amygdaloides, Fagus sylvatica, Lathyrus vernus, Leucojum vernum, Omphalodes verna, Osmunda regalis, Pulmonaria officinalis, Ranunculus ficaria, Quercus cerris, Sanguisorba dodecandra, Saxifraga petraea, Saxifraga vandelli, Scilla bifolia, Sorbus aucuparia, Taxus baccata, and Telekia speciosissima.
- Exotic species - including Amsonia tabernaemontana, Bletia hyacinthina, Brunnera macrophylla, Colocasia antiquorum, Corylopsis spicata, Davidia involucrata, Euonymus alatus, Grevillea rosmarinifolia, Raphiolepis indica, Sarcococca confusa, Staphylea colchica, and Telekia speciosa.

== See also ==
- List of botanical gardens in Italy
