= Carex agastachys =

Scientific classification
- Kingdom: Plantae
- Clade: Tracheophytes
- Clade: Angiosperms
- Clade: Monocots
- Clade: Commelinids
- Order: Poales
- Family: Cyperaceae
- Genus: Carex
- Species: C. agastachys

Binomial name
- Carex agastachys L.f.

Synonyms
- Carex mutabilis Willd. Carex maxima var. angustifolia Albov Carex pendula var. angustifolia (Albov) Kük. Carex pendula subsp. agastachys (L.f.) Ljungstrand

Species of sedge in the family Cyperaceae

Carex agastachys is a species of perennial sedge in the family Cyperaceae. It is native to Europe and extends eastward through the Caucasus and Anatolia to northern Iran.

The species was historically treated as part of a broad concept of Carex pendula, but morphological and molecular studies have demonstrated that C. agastachys and C. pendula are distinct species.

== Description ==
Carex agastachys is a tufted, perennial sedge. Its stems are 50 to 90 cm (20 to 35 in) tall and 2 to 7 mm (0.079 to 0.276 in) wide, with the upper part densely rough-textured (scabrid). The leaf blades are 9 to 16 mm (0.35 to 0.63 in) wide. The ligules are 10 to 27 mm (0.39 to 1.06 in) long and acute, and are characteristically reddish-purple, particularly on the lower and middle leaves.

The inflorescence consists of an erect terminal male spike and several lateral female or shortly androgynous spikes. The male spike is 58 to 105 mm (2.3 to 4.1 in) long and 3 to 5 mm (0.12 to 0.20 in) wide. The lateral spikes are cylindrical and generally 75 to 110 mm (3.0 to 4.3 in) long. They are usually erect, although the lowest spike may spread slightly.

The utricles are approximately 2.0 to 3.3 mm (0.079 to 0.130 in) long and 0.8 to 1.4 mm (0.031 to 0.055 in) wide, and have a bifid beak. The achenes are 1.4 to 1.9 mm (0.055 to 0.075 in) long and are characteristically obovate, with their greatest width toward the upper part of the achene.

Several characters distinguish C. agastachys from the closely related C. pendula. In C. agastachys, the achenes are obovate, the ligules of the lower and middle leaves are conspicuously reddish-purple, and the peduncle of the lowermost spike is generally conspicuously scabrid. In C. pendula, the achenes are more elliptic, the ligules are generally whitish, and the corresponding spike peduncle is usually smooth or only sparsely scabrid.

== Taxonomy ==
The species was first described by the Swedish botanist Carl Linnaeus the Younger in 1782 in Supplementum Plantarum. The type locality was given as Germany, with the original indication Habitat in Germania.

The name has historically been treated in several different ways. It was regarded as a synonym or infraspecific taxon of Carex pendula by some taxonomic authorities. In 2018, an integrative revision of Carex section Rhynchocystis recognized C. agastachys and C. pendula as separate species based on morphological and molecular evidence. The name Carex pendula subsp. agastachys is consequently treated as a synonym of C. agastachys by Plants of the World Online.

There are several heterotypic synonyms:

Carex mutabilis Willd.

Carex maxima var. angustifolia Albov

Carex pendula var. angustifolia (Albov) Kük.

== Distribution ==
Carex agastachys is native to a broad region extending from central and southeastern Europe eastwards to northern Iran. Its distribution includes Germany, Austria, Belgium, Poland, Czech Republic, Slovakia, Hungary, Romania, Bulgaria, Albania, Greece, Turkey, Ukraine, Crimea, the North Caucasus, Transcaucasia and northern Iran.

The species is particularly associated with central and southeastern Europe and has a largely eastern distribution relative to C. pendula, which has a more western, Atlantic and sub-Mediterranean range. The two species meet in parts of central and southeastern Europe.

Plants of the World Online also records C. agastachys as introduced in parts of the United States, including Oregon, Virginia and Washington. Its presence is considered doubtful in Afghanistan and France.

== Habitat and ecology ==
Carex agastachys is a temperate perennial associated with moist habitats, particularly riparian vegetation and wet woodland habitats. It may occur alongside streams and in other permanently or seasonally moist sites.

In areas where its range overlaps with that of C. pendula, the two species can occur together. Morphological intermediates and apparently hybrid individuals have been reported from such contact zones.

== Conservation ==
The species has a broad geographic range and is recorded as native in numerous European and western Asian countries. In Bavaria, Germany, it is currently classified as native and not threatened under the 2024 Bavarian Red List.

== See also ==
- List of Carex species
- Carex pendula
