= Bergamo =

Bergamo Bèrghem (Lombard)
- Comune
- Città di Bergamo
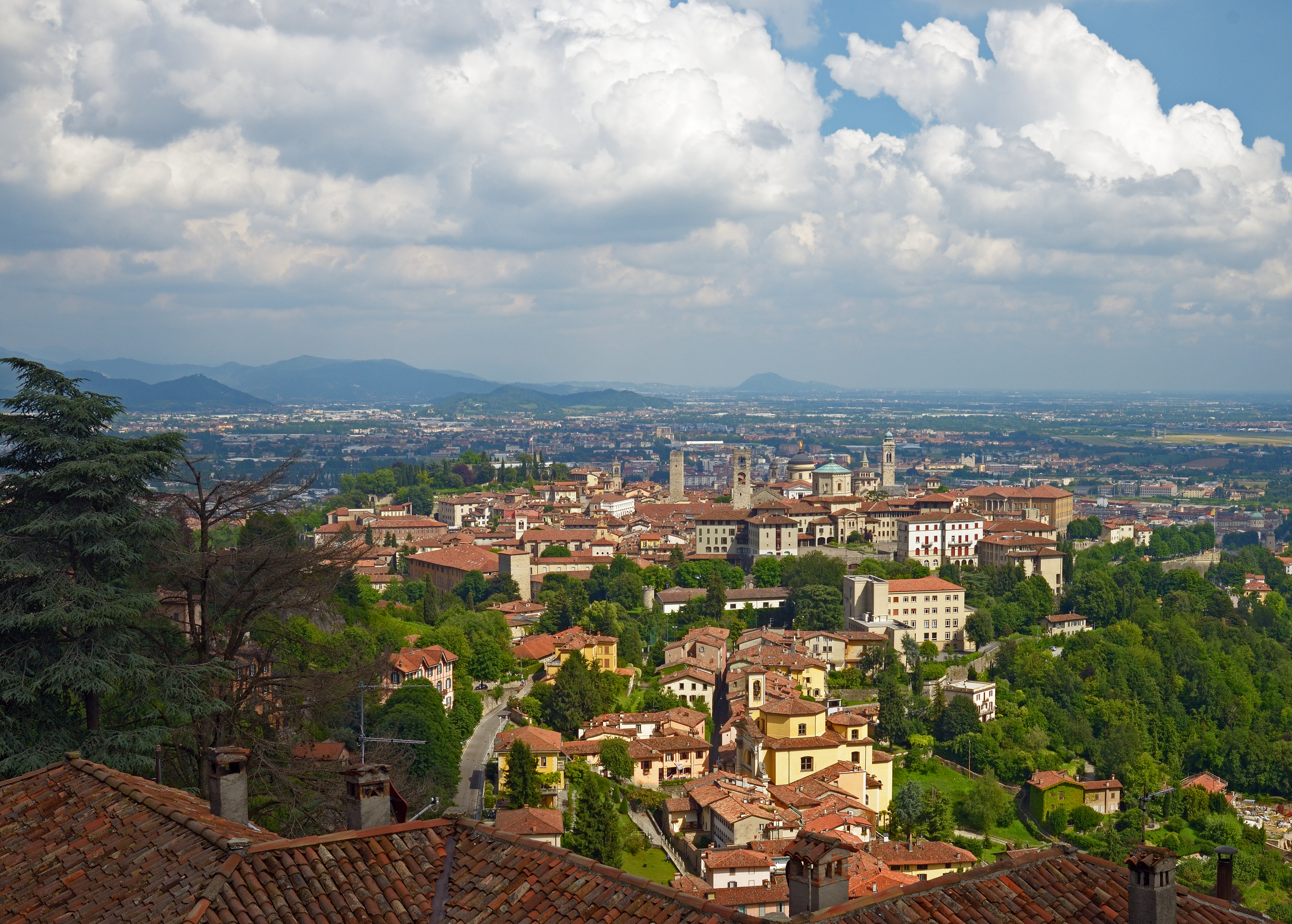
- The skyline of the old fortified Città Alta

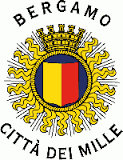
- Flag Coat of arms
- Nickname: Città dei Mille ('City of the Thousand')
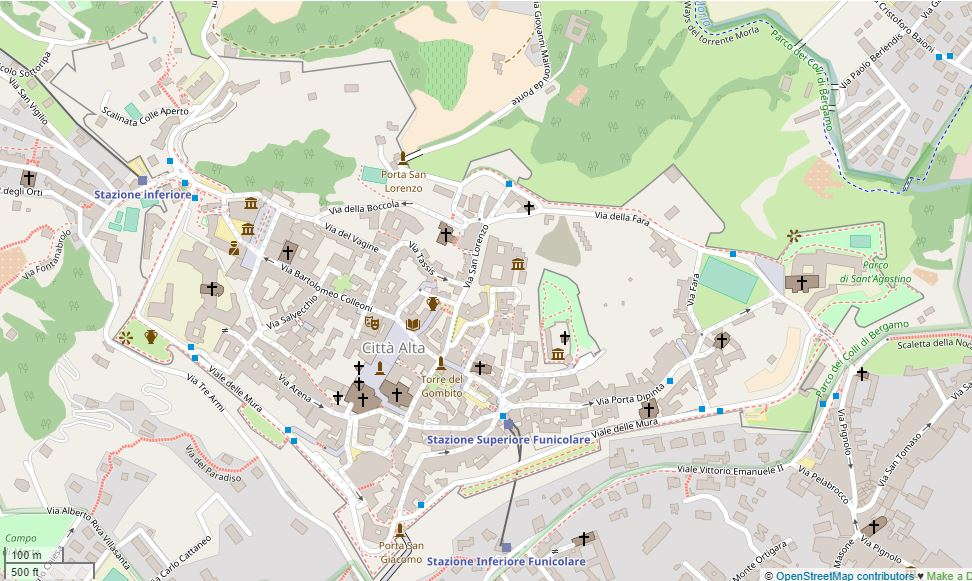
- Map of the old walled Upper City of Bergamo

- Location within Lombardy Location within Italy
- Coordinates: 45°41′42″N 9°40′12″E
- Country: Italy
- Region: Lombardy
- Province: Bergamo (BG)

Government
  - Mayor: Elena Carnevali (PD)

Area
  - Total: 40.16 km^{2} (15.51 sq mi)
- Elevation: 249 m (817 ft)

Population (2026)
  - Total: 120,629
  - Density: 3,004/km^{2} (7,780/sq mi)
- Demonym(s): Bergamasque; Bergamaschi (Italian); Bergamàsch (Eastern Lombard)
- Time zone: UTC+1 (CET)
  - Summer (DST): UTC+2 (CEST)
- Postal code: 24100
- Dialing code: (+39) 035
- Website: www.comune.bergamo.it

Bergamo (/ˈbɜːrɡəmoʊ/ BUR-gə-moh; Italian: [ˈbɛrɡamo]; Bergamasque: Bèrghem [ˈbɛrɡɛm]) is a city in the region of Lombardy in northern Italy. The seat of the province of Bergamo, it is located approximately 40 km (25 mi) northeast of Milan, and about 30 km (19 mi) from the alpine lakes Como and Iseo and 70 km (43 mi) from Garda and Maggiore. The Bergamo Alps (Alpi Orobie) begin immediately north of the city.

With a population of 120,629 as of 2026, Bergamo is the 4th-largest city in Lombardy and the 34th-largest in Italy. The metropolitan area of Bergamo extends beyond the administrative city limits, spanning over a densely urbanized area with slightly fewer than 500,000 inhabitants. The Bergamo metropolitan area is itself part of the broader Milan metropolitan area, home to more than eight million people.

The city of Bergamo is composed of an old walled core, known as Città Alta ('Upper Town'), nestled within a system of hills, and the modern expansion in the plains below. The upper town is encircled by massive Venetian defensive systems that have been a UNESCO World Heritage Site since 9 July 2017.

Bergamo has good links to other cities in Italy via the motorway A4 which connects Milan, Verona, and Venice. The city is served by Il Caravaggio International Airport, the third-busiest airport in Italy with 12.3 million passengers in 2017. Bergamo is the second most visited city in Lombardy after Milan.

== Etymology ==
In classical Latin, the toponym is attested as Bergomum, while in late Latin Bergame. The toponym in the local Bergamasque dialect of the Lombard language is instead Bèrghem. There are various hypotheses put forward to trace the origin of the name of the city.

Local historian and politician Bortolo Belotti compared the toponym to previous Celtic and pre-Celtic names, of which Bergomum would thus only be the Latinisation; the word berg in Celtic means a protection, fortification or abode. In writings of the early Roman period, the toponym Bergomum appears to be associated with Bergimus, the Celtic god of mountains or dwellings.

Historian Antonio Tiraboschi argued instead that the toponym stemmed from the Proto-Germanic language. The Bergamo toponym is similar to toponyms in various Germanic-speaking areas, and might be associated with *berg +*heim, or the "mountain home". The hypothesis of a Germanic derivation clashes however with the absence of documents regarding Germanic settlements in the area prior to the incoming of the Lombards, who migrated to the northern part of the Italian peninsula after the collapse of the Roman Empire.

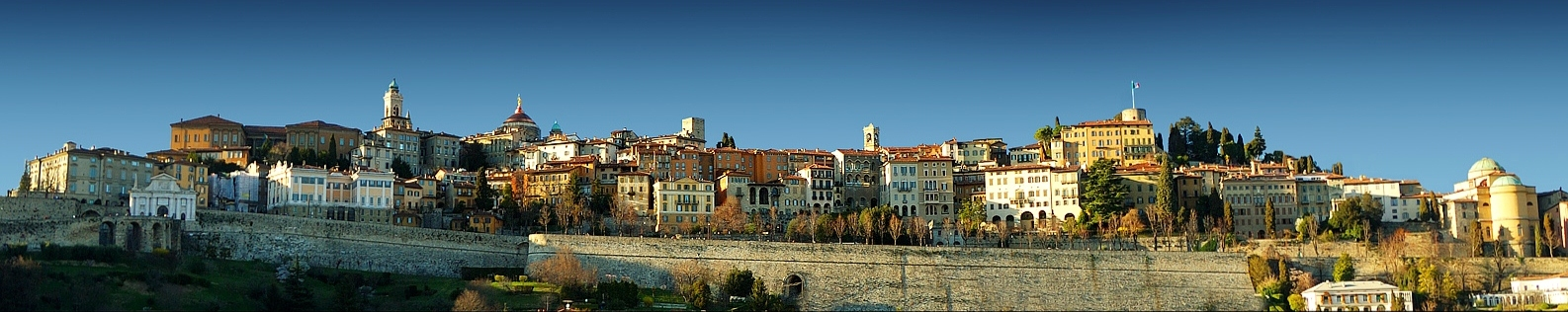
The Città Alta

== History ==
Fortified Upper City of Bergamo
- Città Alta di Bergamo (Lombard)
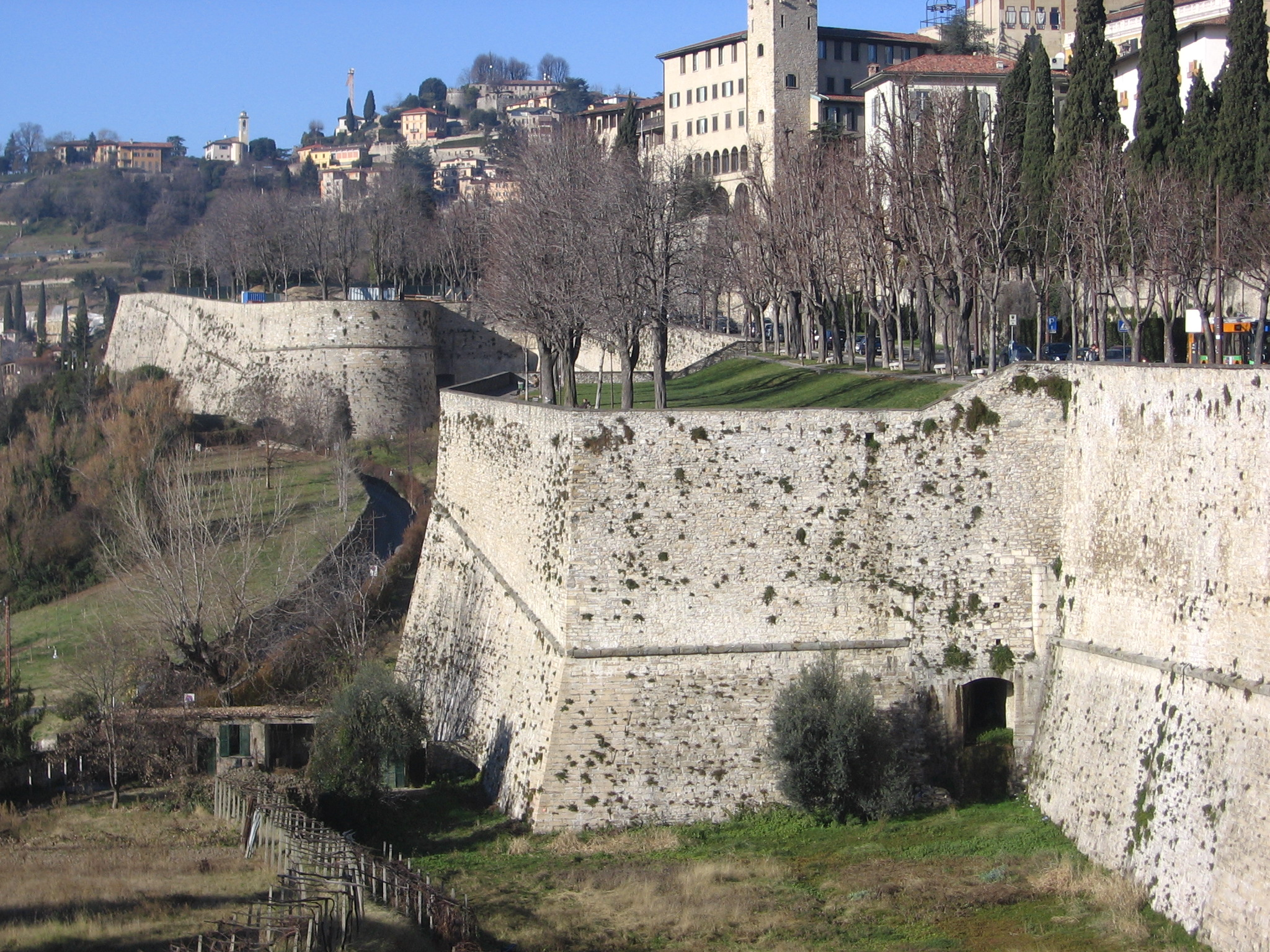
- Fortified walls of Bergamo's Upper City
- Interactive map of Fortified Upper City of Bergamo
- Location: Bergamo, Natural Park of Bergamo Hills

Site notes
- Area: Bergamo, Lombardy, northern Italy

UNESCO World Heritage Site
- Type: Cultural
- Criteria: iii, iv
- Designated: 2017 (41st Session)
- Part of: Venetian Works of Defence between the 16th and 17th centuries: Stato da Terra – Western Stato da Mar
- Reference no.: 1533
- Region: Europe and North America

=== Antiquity ===
Bergomum (as it was known in classical Latin) was first settled by the Ligurian tribe of the Orobii, during the Iron Age period. During the Celtic invasion of northern Italy, around the year of 550 BC, the city was conquered by the Celtic tribe of Cenomani.

In 49 BCE, it became a Roman municipality, containing c. 10,000 inhabitants at its peak. An important hub on the military road between Friuli and Raetia, it was destroyed by Attila in the 5th century.

=== Middle Ages ===
From the 6th century, Bergamo was the seat of one of the most important Lombard duchies of northern Italy, together with Brescia, Trento, and Cividale del Friuli: its first Lombard duke was Wallaris.

After the conquest of the Lombard Kingdom by Charlemagne, it became the seat of a county under one Auteramus (died 816). An important Lombardic hoard dating from the 6th to 7th centuries was found in the vicinity of the city in the 19th century and is now in the British Museum.

From the 11th century onwards, Bergamo was an independent commune, taking part in the Lombard League which defeated Frederick I Barbarossa in 1165. The local Guelph and Ghibelline factions were the Colleoni and Suardi, respectively.

Feuding between the two initially caused the family of Omodeo Tasso to flee north c. 1250, but he returned to Bergamo in the later 13th century to organize the city's couriers: this would eventually lead to the Imperial Thurn und Taxis dynasty generally credited with organizing the first modern postal service.

=== Early modern ===
After a short period under the House of Malatesta starting from 1407, Bergamo was ceded in 1428 by the Duchy of Milan to the Republic of Venice in the context of the Wars in Lombardy and the aftermath of the 1427 Battle of Maclodio.

Despite the brief interlude granted by the Treaty of Lodi in 1454, the uneasy balance of power among the northern Italian states precipitated the Italian Wars, a series of conflicts from 1494 to 1559 that involved, at various times, also the Papal States, France, and the Holy Roman Empire.

The wars, which were both a result and cause of Venetian involvement in the power politics of mainland Italy, prompted Venice to assert its direct rule over its mainland domains.

As much of the fighting during the Italian Wars took place during sieges, increasing levels of fortification were adopted, using such new developments as detached bastions that could withstand sustained artillery fire.

The Treaty of Campo Formio (17 October 1797) formally recognized the inclusion of Bergamo and other parts of northern Italy into the Cisalpine Republic, a "sister republic" of the French First Republic that was superseded in 1802 by the short-lived Napoleonic Italian Republic and in 1805 by the Napoleonic Kingdom of Italy.

=== Late modern and contemporary ===
At the 1815 Congress of Vienna, Bergamo was assigned to the Kingdom of Lombardy–Venetia, a crown land of the Austrian Empire. The visit of Ferdinand I in 1838 coincided with the opening of the new boulevard stretching into the plains, leading to the railway station that was inaugurated in 1857. Austrian rule was at first welcomed, but later challenged by Italian independentist insurrections in 1848.

Giuseppe Garibaldi conquered Bergamo in 1859, during the Second Italian War of Independence. As a result, the city was incorporated into the newly founded Kingdom of Italy.

For its contribution to the Italian unification movement, Bergamo is also known as Città dei Mille ('City of the Thousand'), because a significant part of the rank-and-file supporting Giuseppe Garibaldi in his expedition against the Kingdom of the Two Sicilies came from Bergamo and its environs.

During the twentieth century, Bergamo became one of Italy's most industrialized areas.

In 1907, Marcello Piacentini devised a new urban master plan that was implemented between 1912 and 1927, in a style reminiscent of Novecento Italiano and Modernist Rationalism.

The 2017 43rd G7 summit on agriculture was held in Bergamo, in the context of the broader international meeting in Taormina.

The "Charter of Bergamo" is an international commitment, signed during the summit, to reduce hunger worldwide by 2030, strengthen cooperation for agricultural development in Africa, and ensure price transparency.

In early 2020, during the COVID-19 pandemic in Italy, Bergamo's healthcare system was overwhelmed by patients with COVID-19. There were reports of doctors confronted with ethical dilemmas with too few ICU beds and mechanical ventilation systems. Morgues were overwhelmed, and images of military trucks carrying the bodies of COVID-19 victims out of the city were shared worldwide. An investigative report by The New York Times found that faulty guidance and bureaucratic delays rendered the toll in Bergamo far worse than it had to be.

In July 2020, the Italian Parliament designated Bergamo and Brescia jointly as Italian Capital of Culture for 2023, the first time the annual title had been shared by two cities. Among the principal initiatives of the year in Bergamo was the reopening of the Accademia Carrara in January 2023 following a major refurbishment of the museum, accompanied by an exhibition devoted to Cecco del Caravaggio, a painter born in the Bergamo area.

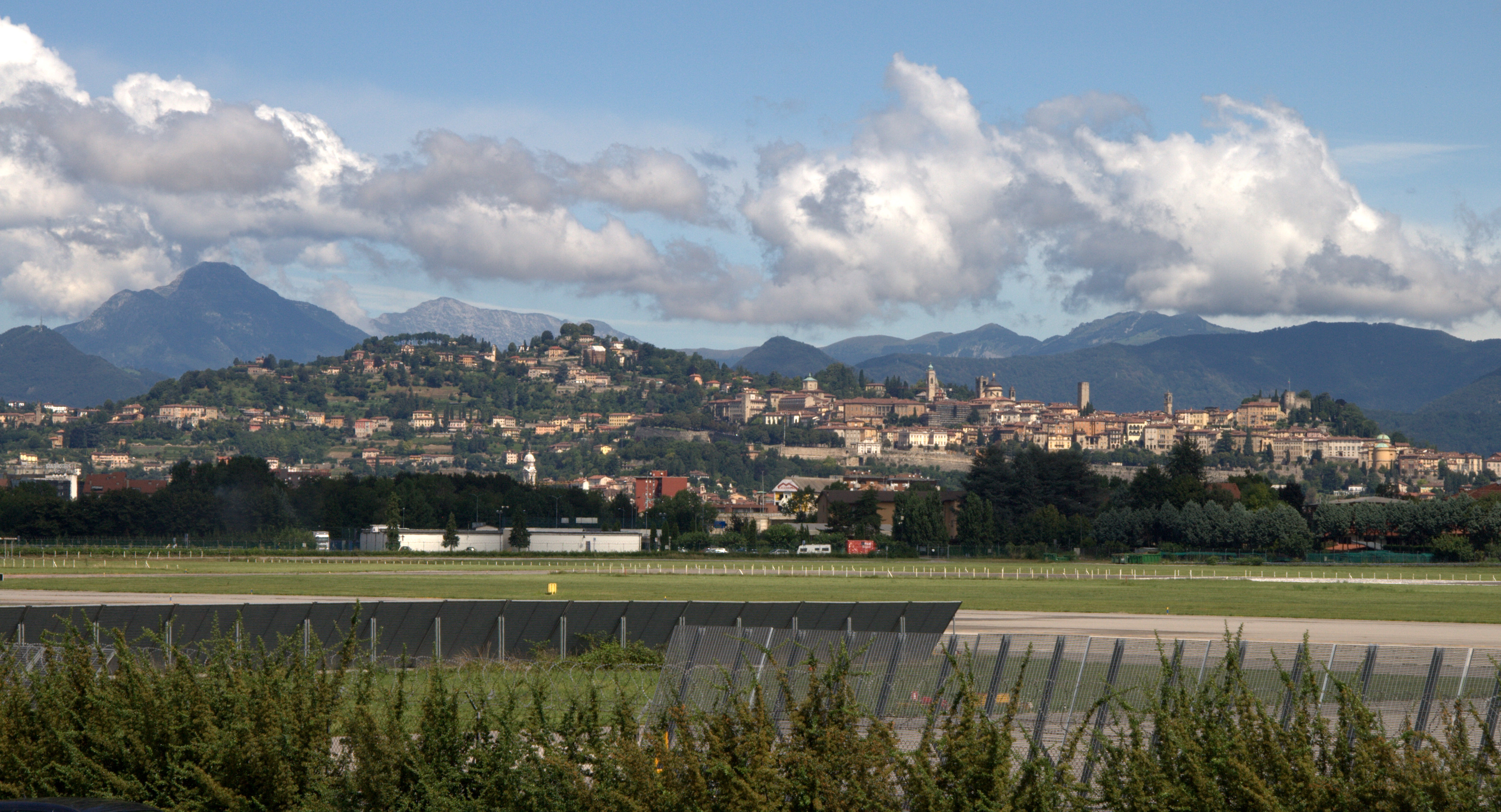
Bergamo Upper Town and Alpi Orobie from the airport

== Geography ==
=== Climate ===
According to the Köppen climate classification, Bergamo features a humid subtropical climate (Cfa).

Climate data for Bergamo (1991–2020, extremes 1946–present)
Month	Jan	Feb	Mar	Apr	May	Jun	Jul	Aug	Sep	Oct	Nov	Dec	Year
Record high °C (°F)	21.9 (71.4)	22.7 (72.9)	27.1 (80.8)	31.9 (89.4)	35.5 (95.9)	36.3 (97.3)	39.0 (102.2)	37.9 (100.2)	32.4 (90.3)	31.5 (88.7)	23.0 (73.4)	19.0 (66.2)	39.0 (102.2)
Mean daily maximum °C (°F)	7.8 (46.0)	9.3 (48.7)	14.2 (57.6)	18.2 (64.8)	22.9 (73.2)	27.0 (80.6)	29.6 (85.3)	28.9 (84.0)	24.2 (75.6)	18.3 (64.9)	12.2 (54.0)	8.0 (46.4)	18.4 (65.1)
Daily mean °C (°F)	3.6 (38.5)	4.9 (40.8)	9.2 (48.6)	13.1 (55.6)	17.7 (63.9)	21.8 (71.2)	24.1 (75.4)	23.6 (74.5)	19.1 (66.4)	14.1 (57.4)	8.5 (47.3)	4.0 (39.2)	13.7 (56.7)
Mean daily minimum °C (°F)	−0.2 (31.6)	0.7 (33.3)	4.3 (39.7)	8.1 (46.6)	12.3 (54.1)	16.3 (61.3)	18.5 (65.3)	18.3 (64.9)	14.5 (58.1)	10.2 (50.4)	5.0 (41.0)	0.6 (33.1)	9.0 (48.2)
Record low °C (°F)	−15.0 (5.0)	−20.1 (−4.2)	−7.7 (18.1)	−3.6 (25.5)	1.7 (35.1)	4.2 (39.6)	8.9 (48.0)	8.4 (47.1)	5.1 (41.2)	−1.7 (28.9)	−7.0 (19.4)	−12.4 (9.7)	−20.1 (−4.2)
Average precipitation mm (inches)	44.5 (1.75)	49.8 (1.96)	53.0 (2.09)	79.5 (3.13)	103.9 (4.09)	103.3 (4.07)	63.2 (2.49)	92.1 (3.63)	105.5 (4.15)	103.0 (4.06)	149.1 (5.87)	61.5 (2.42)	1,008.4 (39.70)
Average precipitation days (≥ 1.0 mm)	5.1	5.3	5.8	8.4	10.0	8.0	5.0	6.4	6.4	7.8	8.4	6.4	82.7
Average relative humidity (%)	71.6	69.1	64.3	64.8	65.5	64.5	63.2	65.0	67.9	74.0	75.9	74.2	68.3
Average dew point °C (°F)	−0.8 (30.6)	−0.4 (31.3)	2.5 (36.5)	6.0 (42.8)	10.4 (50.7)	14.1 (57.4)	15.9 (60.6)	16.1 (61.0)	12.6 (54.7)	9.4 (48.9)	4.7 (40.5)	0.1 (32.2)	7.5 (45.5)
Source 1: NOAA
Source 2: Servizio Meteorologico (extremes)

== Demographics ==
Historical population
Year	Pop.	±%
1861	44,765	—
1871	42,662	−4.7%
1881	44,291	+3.8%
1901	52,482	+18.5%
1911	64,422	+22.8%
1921	72,260	+12.2%
1931	80,050	+10.8%
1936	86,788	+8.4%
1951	103,236	+19.0%
1961	114,948	+11.3%
1971	127,884	+11.3%
1981	123,383	−3.5%
1991	114,820	−6.9%
2001	113,038	−1.6%
2011	115,349	+2.0%
2021	119,476	+3.6%
Source: ISTAT

As of 2026, the population is 120,629, of which 47.8% are male, and 52.2% are female. Minors make up 13.9% of the population, and seniors make up 25.6%.

=== Immigration ===
As of 2025, immigrants make up 19.2% of the population. The 5 largest foreign countries of birth are Bolivia, Ukraine, Morocco, Albania, and Romania.

Foreign population by country of birth (2025)
Country of birth	Population
Bolivia	2,788
Ukraine	1,962
Morocco	1,502
Albania	1,320
Romania	1,242
Bangladesh	1,201
China	884
Brazil	717
Senegal	678
Pakistan	537
Peru	527
India	453
Philippines	432
Ecuador	377
Argentina	370

== Cityscape ==
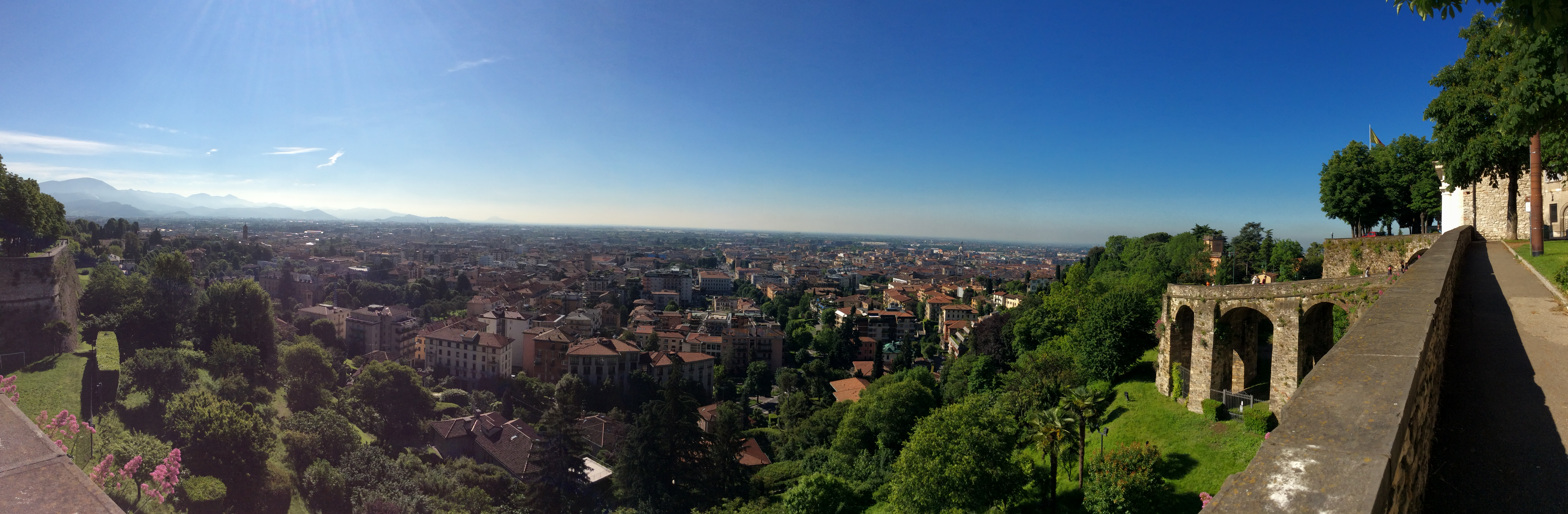
Lower City seen from Upper City

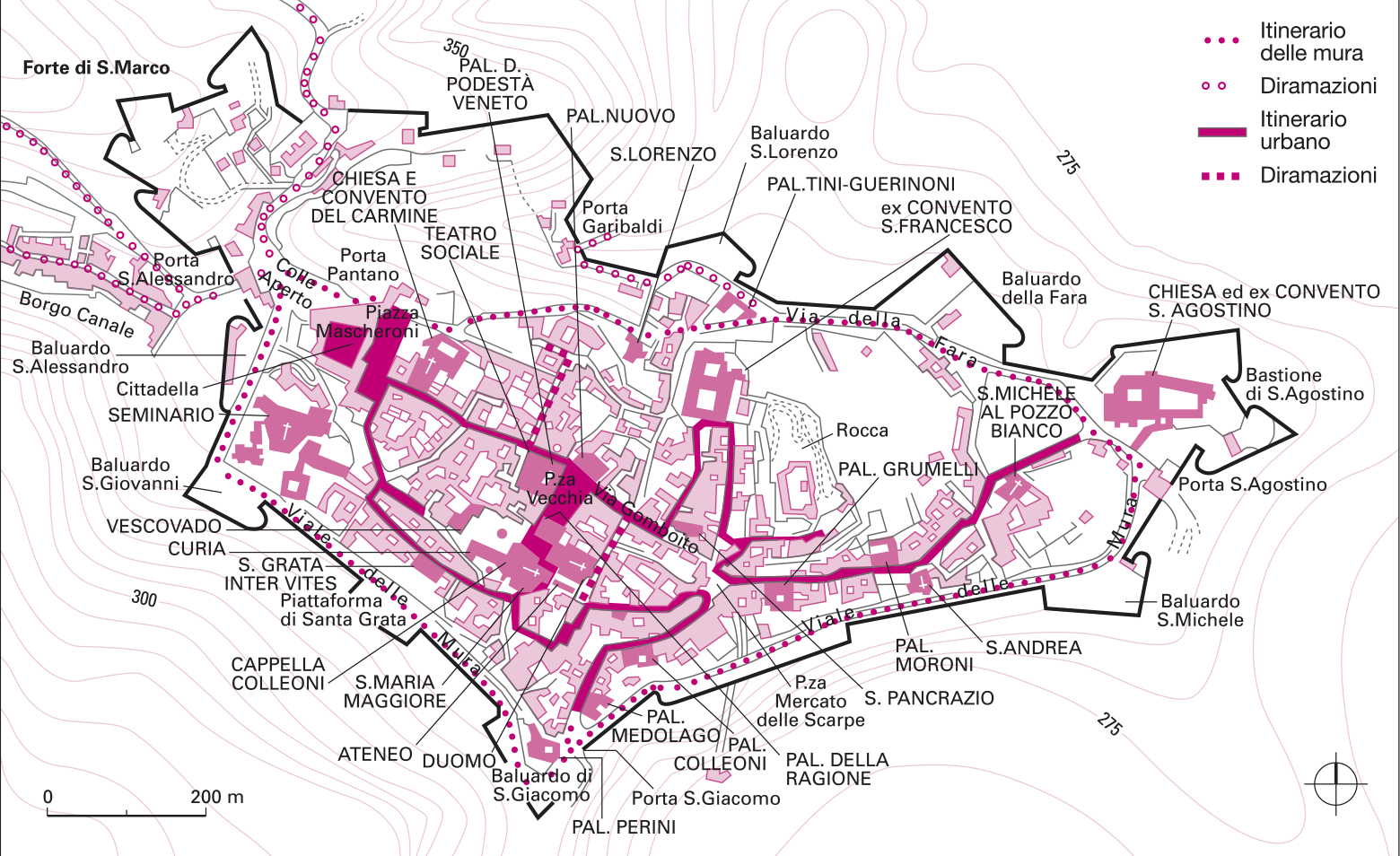
Walled city map

The town has two centres: Città Alta ('Upper City'), a hilltop medieval town, surrounded by 16th-century defensive walls, and the Città Bassa ('Lower City'). The two parts of the town are connected by funicular, roads, and footpaths.

=== Upper city ===
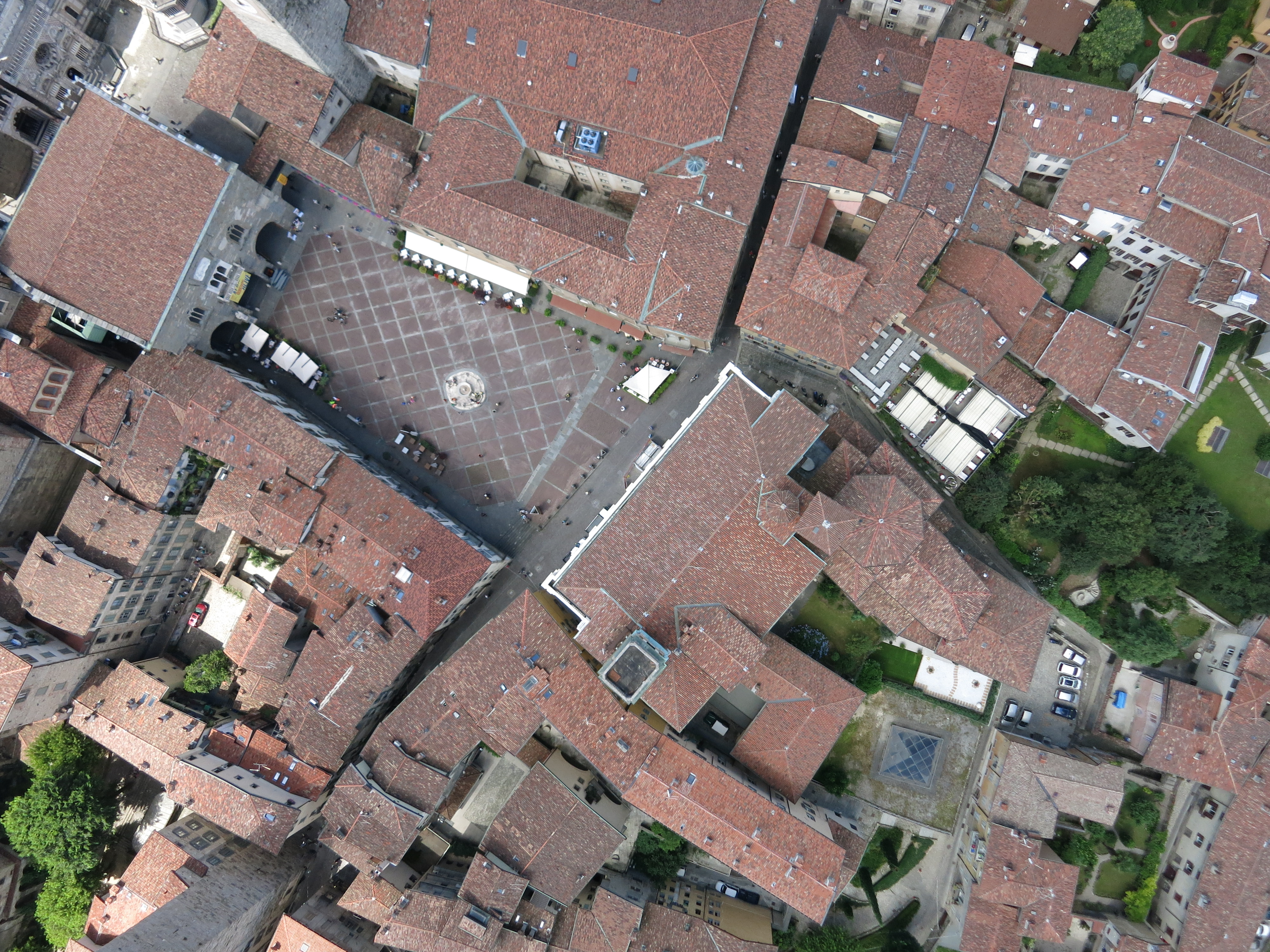
The Upper City

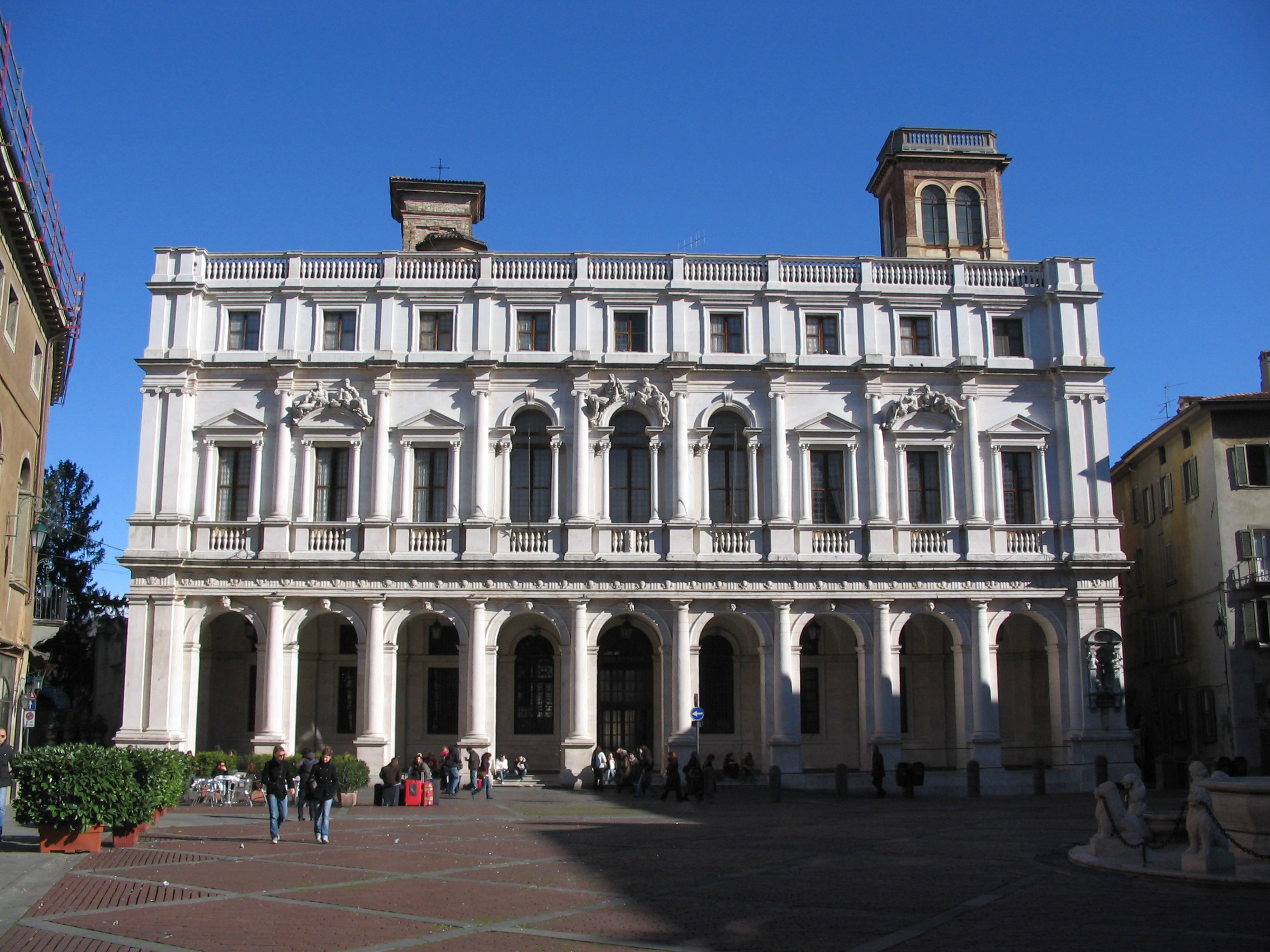
The Angelo Maj library

The upper city (Italian: Città Alta; Bergamasque: Bèrghem de sura), surrounded by Venetian walls built in the 16th century, forms the historic centre of Bergamo.

- Cittadella (Citadel), built under the rule of the Visconti in the mid-14th century.
- Piazza Vecchia
- Palazzo della Ragione. This was the seat of the administration of the city in the medieval municipal period. Built in the 12th century, it was revamped in the late 16th century by Pietro Isabello. The façade has the Lion of Saint Mark over a mullioned window, testifying to the long period of Venetian rule. The atrium has a well-preserved 18th-century sundial.
- Palazzo Nuovo (Biblioteca Civica Angelo Mai). It was designed by Vincenzo Scamozzi in the early 17th century and completed in 1928.
- Basilica di Santa Maria Maggiore. It was built from 1137 on the site of a previous religious edifice of the 7th century. Construction continued until the 15th century. Of this first building, the external Romanesque structure and the Greek cross plan remain. The interior was extensively modified in the 16th and 17th centuries. Noteworthy are the great Crucifix and the tomb of Gaetano Donizetti.
- Cappella Colleoni, annexed to Santa Maria Maggiore, is a masterwork of Renaissance architecture and decorative art. It contains the tomb of Bartolomeo Colleoni.
- Battistero (Baptistry), an elegant octagonal building dating from 1340.
- Bergamo Cathedral. It was built in the late 17th century with later modifications.
- Rocca. It was begun in 1331 on the hill of Sant'Eufemia by William of Castelbarco, vicar of John of Bohemia, and later completed by Azzone Visconti. A wider citadel was added, but is now partly lost.
- San Michele al Pozzo Bianco. Built in the 12th century, this church contains several frescoes from the 12th to the 16th centuries, including paintings by Lorenzo Lotto.
- Tempietto di Santa Croce. Small 12th century octagonal Romanesque chapel.
- Museo Civico Archeologico. It is housed in the Cittadella. The museum conducts research on local and alpine antiquities.
- Museo di Scienze Naturali Enrico Caffi. It is housed in the Cittadella.
- Orto Botanico di Bergamo "Lorenzo Rota" (botanical garden).

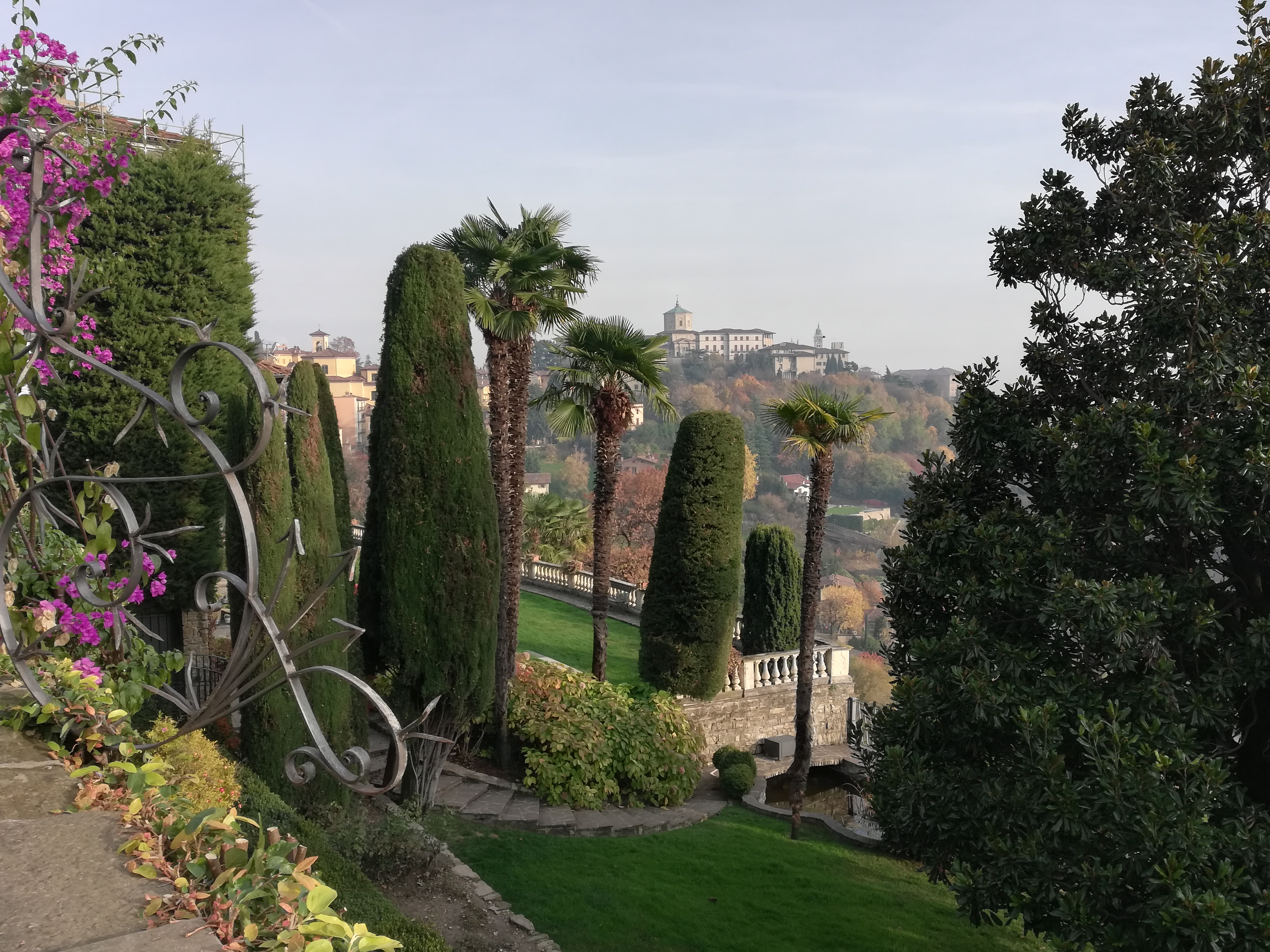
View of Bergamo Città Alta from Via Sudorno (2021)

=== Lower city ===
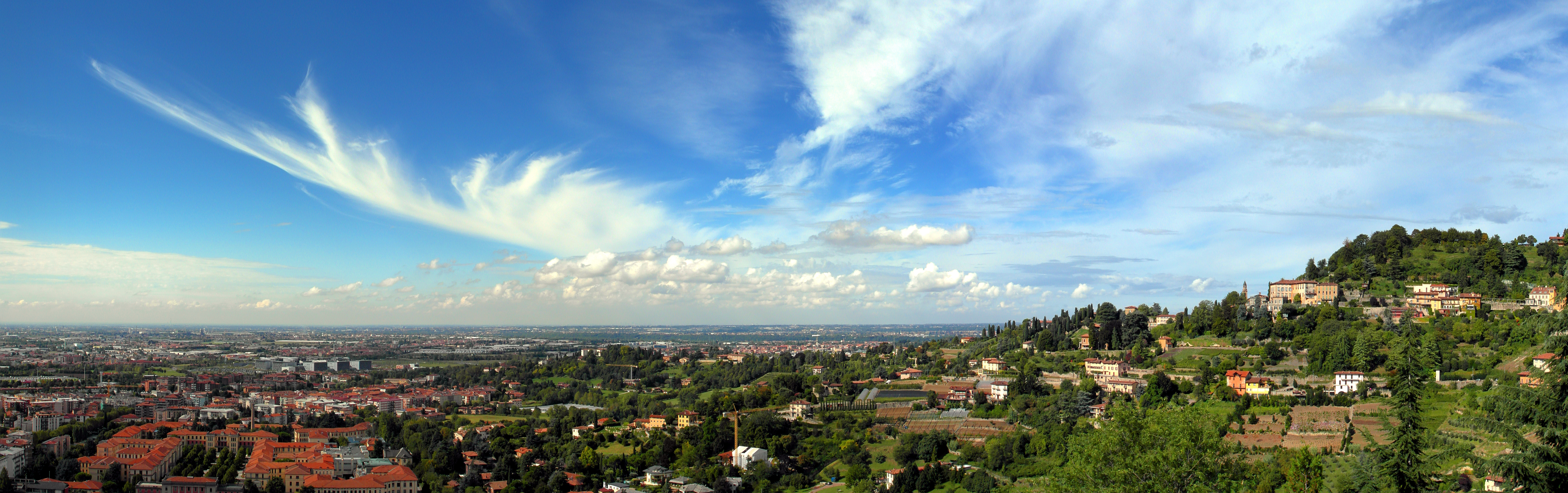
Bergamo Upper City, Lower City and Bergamo Hills

The lower city (Italian: Città Bassa; Bergamasque: Bèrghem de sóta) is the modern centre of Bergamo. At the end of the 19th century, Città Bassa was composed of residential neighborhoods built along the main roads that linked Bergamo to the other cities of Lombardy. The main boroughs were Borgo Palazzo along the road to Brescia, Borgo San Leonardo along the road to Milan, and Borgo Santa Caterina along the road to Serio Valley. Borgo Santa Caterina is one of I Borghi più belli d'Italia ('The most beautiful villages of Italy').

The city rapidly expanded during the 20th century. In the first decades, the municipality erected major buildings such as the new courthouse and various administrative offices in the lower part of Bergamo in order to create a new city center. After World War II, many residential buildings were constructed in the lower part of the city, which are now divided into twenty-five neighborhoods:

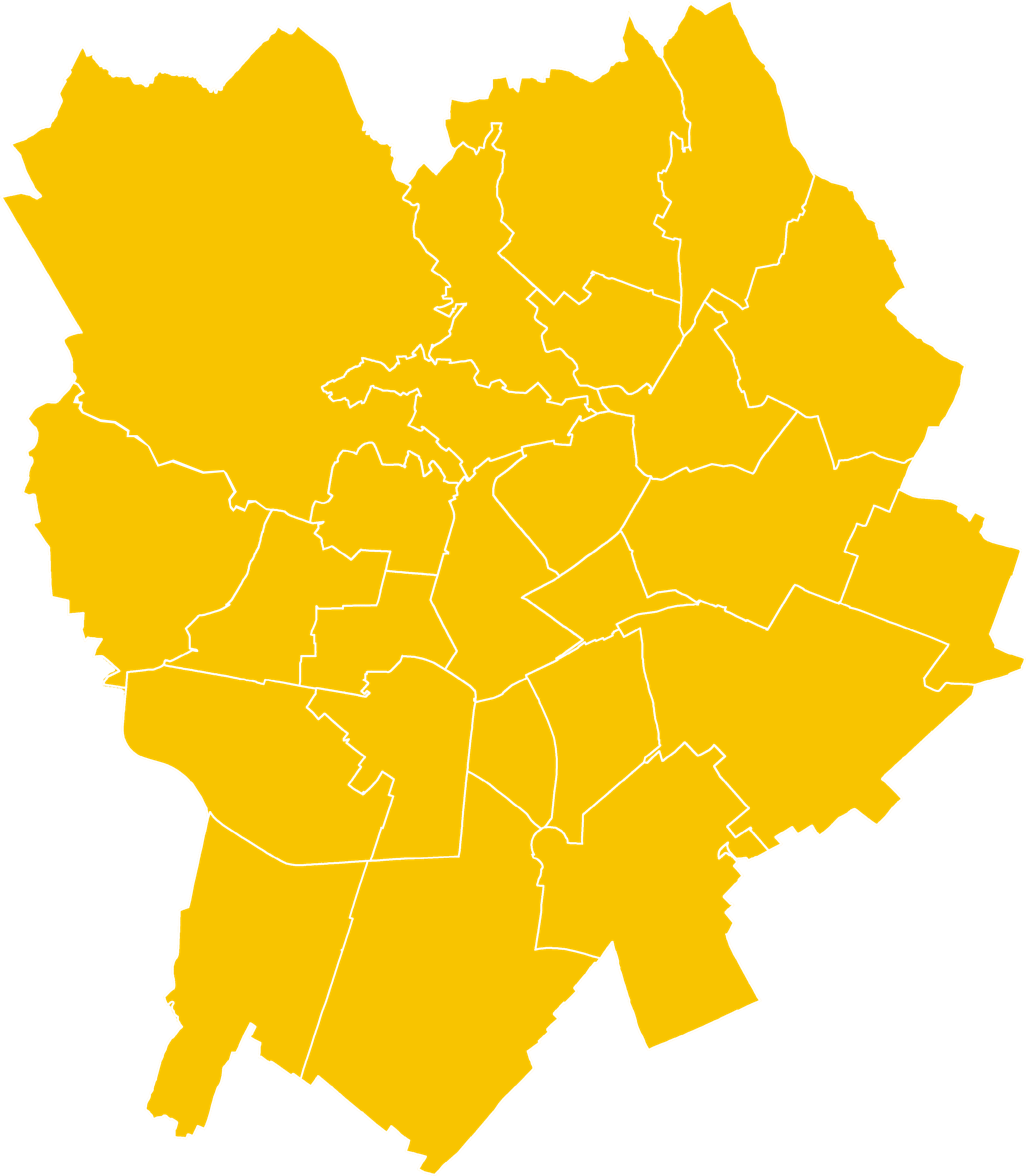
Neighborhoods of Bergamo

- Boccaleone
- Borgo Palazzo
- Borgo Santa Caterina
- Campagnola
- Carnovali
- Celadina
- Centro-Papa Giovanni XXIII
- Centro-Pignolo
- Centro-Sant'Alessandro
- Città Alta
- Colli
- Colognola
- Conca Fiorita
- Grumello del Piano
- Longuelo
- Loreto
- Malpensata
- Monterosso
- Redona
- San Paolo
- San Tomaso de' Calvi
- Santa Lucia
- Valtesse-San Colombano
- Valverde con Valtesse-Sant'Antonio
- Villaggio degli Sposi

The most relevant sites are:

- Accademia Carrara
- Galleria d'Arte Moderna e Contemporanea (GAMeC, Gallery of Modern and Contemporary Art).

== Culture ==
=== Notable natives ===
Gaetano Donizetti was born in Bergamo in 1797. He's considered one of the most important composers of all time, best known for his almost 70 operas. Along with Gioachino Rossini and Vincenzo Bellini, he was a leading composer of the bel canto opera style during the first half of the nineteenth century and a probable influence on other composers such as Giuseppe Verdi.

Bergamo was the hometown and last resting place of Enrico Rastelli, a highly technical and world-famous juggler who lived in the town and, in 1931, died there at the early age of 34. There is a life-sized statue of Rastelli within his mausoleum. A number of painters were active in the town as well; among these were Giovanni Paolo Cavagna, Francesco Zucco, and Enea Salmeggia, each of whom painted works for the church of Santa Maria Maggiore. Sculptor Giacomo Manzù and the bass-baritone opera singer Alex Esposito were born in Bergamo.

The American electrical engineer and professor Andrew Viterbi, inventor of Viterbi's algorithm, was born in Bergamo, before migrating to the US during the Fascist era because of his Jewish origins. Designers born in Bergamo include Nicola Trussardi and the late Mariuccia Mandelli, the founder of Krizia and one of the first female fashion designers to create a successful line of men's wear.

The physicist Fausto Martelli was born in Bergamo in 1982. Fausto Martelli is known for his fundamental contributions to the physics of liquids and glasses.

=== Theater ===
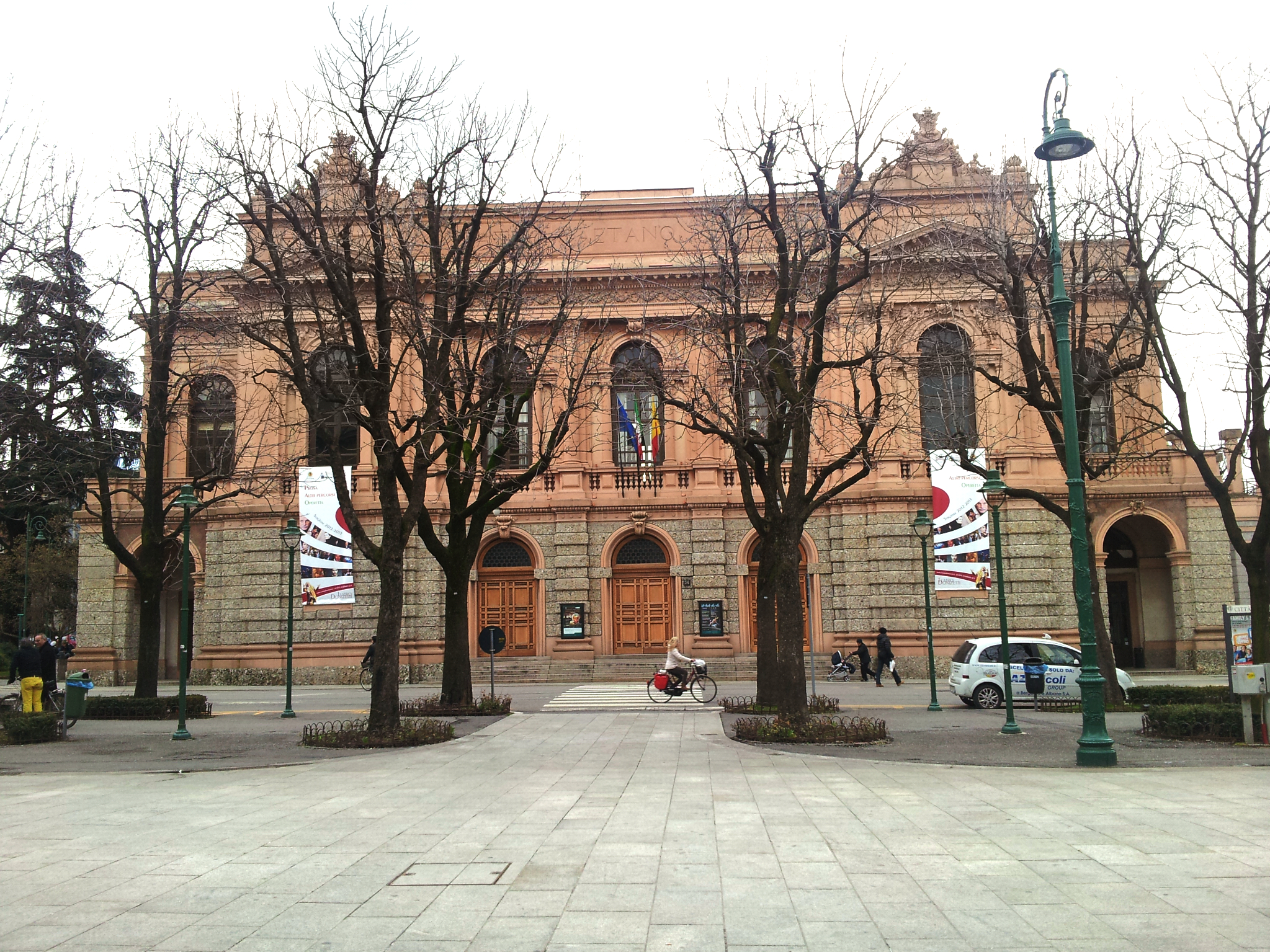
Gaetano Donizetti Theatre

The main city theatre is the Gaetano Donizetti Theater; another historical theater is the Teatro Sociale, in the Upper Town.

More modern is the tensile structure that houses the "Creberg Teatro Bergamo" with 1536 seats, which makes it one of the largest theatres in the province.

Another theatrical structure is the Auditorium in Piazza della Libertà. The building that houses the Auditorium was built in 1937 as the seat of the local Fascist Federation and is known as the "House of Freedom".

Among the theatrical companies operating in Bergamo, there are the TTB (teatro tascabile di Bergamo), La Compagnia Stabile di Teatro, Erbamil, Pandemonium Teatro, Teatro Prova, Ambaradan and Slapsus, Luna and Gnac, the CUT (University Theatre Center) and La Gilda delle Arti - Teatro Bergamo.

== Economy ==
Bergamo is in Lombardy, Italy's northern region, where about a quarter of the country's GDP is produced.

The city has an advanced tertiary economy focused on banking, retail, and services associated with the industrial sector of its province. Corporations and firms linked to the city include UBI banking group, Brembo (braking systems), Tenaris (steel), and ABB (power and automation technology).

== Education ==
Bergamo has pre-school, primary and secondary institutions throughout the municipality. State upper secondary provision includes a classical lyceum (named after Paolo Sarpi), three scientific lyceums, two linguistic lyceums, two art lyceums, a lyceum of human sciences and music, five technical institutes and an institute for tourism.

The municipal library system centers on the Biblioteca civica Angelo Mai in Piazza Vecchia, which holds the city's historical archives together with incunabula and sixteenth-century printing, and on the Biblioteca Antonio Tiraboschi, whose present building, opened in 2004 to a design by Mario Botta, provides 2,500 square meters over five floors and around 120,000 volumes. Notably, Bergamo was designated as a "City that Reads" (Città che legge) in 2020.

The University of Bergamo, established in 1968, has expanded across the city since its inception. Currently, it has a Humanities campus in the Città Alta and an Economics and Law campus in the lower town. The Rectorate occupies the seventeenth-century Palazzo Terzi, while the Engineering department is in nearby Dalmine. Two further institutions offer higher education outside the university system: the Bergamo Conservatory, founded in 1806 by Johann Simon Mayr and attended by Gaetano Donizetti, and the fine arts academy attached to the Accademia Carrara, founded in 1796.

Research institutions in the city include the Mario Negri Institute for Pharmacological Research; the Kilometro Rosso science and technology park on the southern edge of the city; an Academy of Sciences, Letters, and Arts, a "learned society" founded in the eighteenth century; and ISREC, an institute which studies the Italian Resistance and contemporary history.

== Transport ==
Bergamo is served by Il Caravaggio International Airport, 5 km (3 mi) southeast of the city, with Milan Linate Airport 50 km (31 mi) to the southwest and Milan Malpensa Airport 87 km (54 mi) to the west. The city is served by direct rail links towards Milan, Brescia, Verona, Bologna and Florence, as well as some direct high-speed connections to Rome and Naples.

Urban transport is operated by ATB, which runs the city bus network together with two funiculars, one linking the lower city to the Città Alta and the other continuing to the Colle di San Vigilio. An interurban tramway to Albino, opened in 2009, is operated by TEB with a second line towards Villa d'Almè also scheduled to enter service during 2026.

=== Air ===
Il Caravaggio International Airport at Orio al Serio is operated by SACBO. Ryanair began operating from Bergamo in February 2002 and made it the airline's first Italian base the following year, with three based aircraft and seven new international routes. The airport is now the third-busiest in Italy, after Rome Fiumicino and Milan Malpensa, and 41st in Europe; it handled 16.9 million passengers in 2025, slightly below the record 17.3 million of 2024.

=== Rail ===
Bergamo railway station lies on the Lecco–Brescia line and is served by Trenord regional trains towards Milan, Brescia, Lecco and Treviglio. A new double-track branch of about 5.3 km is under construction between the station and the airport, the first kilometer running alongside the existing line towards Montello. The airport station will have four platform tracks and 250-metre platforms, connected to the terminal by an underground passage, bringing the airport within about ten minutes of the city center. Activation is expected by December 2026.

=== Tramways ===
The T1 tramway between Bergamo and Albino, opened in 2009, is operated by Tramvie Elettriche Bergamasche (TEB) and runs for 12.5 km along the course of the former Valle Seriana railway. A second line, the T2, follows the route of the disused Valle Brembana railway for 11.5 km from Bergamo to Villa d'Almè, passing through five municipalities and serving a catchment of some 240,000 people. Main construction was completed on 30 June 2026 and the line is due to enter service in autumn 2026, subject to testing and authorization by the Ministry of Infrastructure and ANSFISA.

=== Urban transport ===
Urban services are run by Azienda Trasporti Bergamo (ATB), established in 1907, which operates thirteen bus routes serving the city and 29 neighboring municipalities, along with the two funiculars; line 1 provides the direct connection to the airport. The funicular between the lower city and the Città Alta dates from 1887, while the line from Colle Aperto to the Colle di San Vigilio opened in 1912, closed in 1976 and was reinstated in 1991. A single fare system covers buses, trams and funiculars.

=== Cycling ===
ATB also operates the city's public bicycle scheme, La BiGi – a contraction of bici and BG, the provincial abbreviation – run in partnership with nextbike and available around the clock. The fleet comprises some 390 conventional bicycles and 20 electric ones, the latter intended for the climb to the Città Alta. A cycle path of about 10 km is being built alongside the T2 tramway between Bronzetti and Villa d'Almè.

== Sport ==
- Bergamo's football team is Atalanta, who play in the top level Serie A at the Stadio di Bergamo. They won the Coppa Italia in 1963 and the UEFA Europa League in 2024, beating Bayer Leverkusen 3–0 in the final in Dublin for the club's first European trophy. A reserve side, Atalanta U23, has competed in Serie C since 2023.
- The city has a women's volleyball team named Volley Bergamo, the most decorated sports club in Bergamo. Known as Foppapedretti Bergamo until 2018 and Zanetti Bergamo until 2022, it won eight Italian championships, seven CEV Champions League titles, six Coppe Italia and six Italian Supercups. Its sporting title has since passed to Volley Bergamo 1991.
- The city is also home to the Bergamo Lions American football team, the most successful in Italy, with 12 national titles – 11 of them between 1998 and 2008 – and three European championships, including multiple Eurobowls. They play at the Don Bepo Vavassori sports centre.
- Bergamo has hosted the Internazionali di Tennis di Bergamo, an ATP Challenger Tour tournament, since 2006. Matteo Berrettini (2018), Jannik Sinner (2019) and Jack Draper (2023) are among its winners. After a year in Rovereto the event returned to the city in November 2025 at the newly built ChorusLife Arena, upgraded to Challenger 100 status.
- In cycling, Bergamo hosted the final stage of the 1912 Giro d'Italia and has been a stage town on fourteen occasions. It is frequently a start or finish for the Giro di Lombardia, the last of the five Monument classics, and hosted the 2008 Italian road race championship.
- The Olympic gold medalist skier Sofia Goggia was born in Bergamo in 1992. She won the gold medal in downhill skiing at the 2018 Winter Olympics and the silver medal at the 2022 Winter Olympics.
- The Olympic gold medalist snowboarder Michela Moioli was born in a town in the metropolitan area of Bergamo in 1995. She won the gold medal in snowboard cross at the 2018 Winter Olympics and the silver medal in mixed team snowboard cross at the 2022 Winter Olympics.

== Notable churches ==
- San Benedetto, Bergamo
- San Bernardino in Pignolo, Bergamo
- San Giovanni XXIII, Bergamo
- San Michele al Pozzo Bianco

== Notable people ==
- Francesco Akira
- Giovanni Michele Alberto da Carrara
- Francesco Cucchi
- Gaetano Donizetti
- Silvia Filippini-Fantoni
- Gianandrea Gavazzeni
- Pietro Locatelli
- Lorenzo Lotto
- Giacomo Manzù
- Pio Manzù
- Ginevra Panzeri
- Andrea Previtali
- Enrico Rastelli

== International relations ==
=== Twin towns – sister cities ===
Bergamo is twinned with:

- Greenville, United States, since 1985
- Pueblo, United States
- Mulhouse, France, since 1989
- Tver', Russia, since 1989
- Bengbu, People's Republic of China, since 1988
- Cochabamba, Bolivia, since 2008
- Olkusz, Poland, since 2009
- Ludwigsburg, Germany, since 2022
- Bucha, Ukraine, since 2022

Bergamo has a partnership with:

- Dąbrowa Górnicza, Poland
- Bolesław, Poland
- Posadas, Argentina, as Friendship and Cooperation city since 1998

=== Consulates ===
Bergamo is home to the following consulates:

- Bolivia
- Switzerland
