= Maurizio Cucchi =

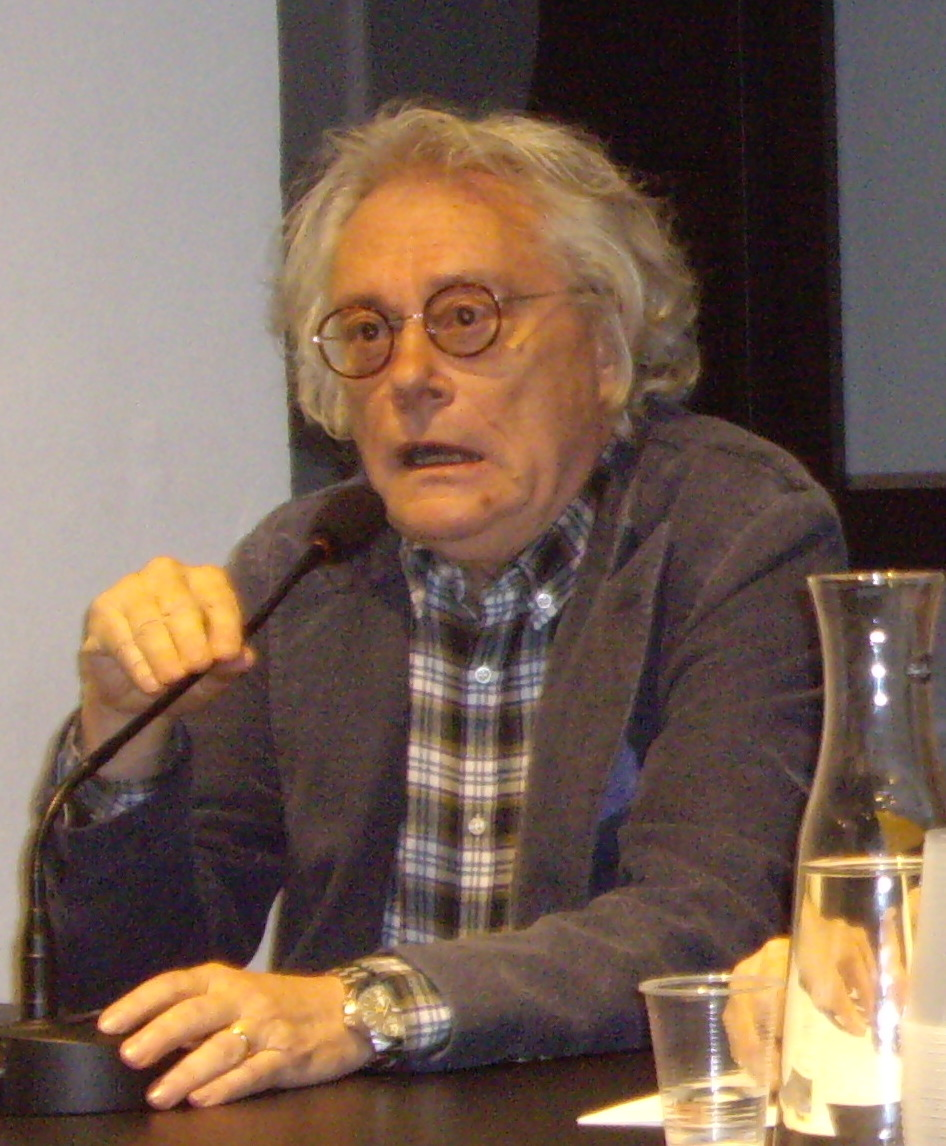
- Born: 20 September 1945 (age 80); Milan, Italy

Maurizio Cucchi (born 20 September 1945) is an Italian poet and writer.

== Biography ==
Cucchi was born in 1945 in Milan. He graduated to the Università Cattolica del Sacro Cuore of Milan. From 1960 to 1971 he was a sports journalist, collaborating over time with some newspapers such as Corriere dello Sport and Italia Oggi”.

He published several books of poetry and narrative. His first collection of poetry was published in 1976.

== Works ==
=== Poetry ===
- Paradossalmente e con affanno. Trentatré poesie, Milano, Teograf., 1971.
- Il disperso, Milano, A. Mondadori, 1976; Milano, Guanda.
- Le meraviglie dell'acqua, Milano, A. Mondadori, 1980.
- Il figurante (1971-1985), Firenze, Sansoni, 1985.
- Donna del gioco, Milano, A. Mondadori, 1987.
- La luce del distacco. Versi per il teatro, Milano, Crocetti, 1990.
- Poesia della fonte, Milano, A. Mondadori, 1993. .
- Hotel riviera. Poesie d'affetto e d'occasione, Cesena, Medusa, 1996.
- L'ultimo viaggio di Glenn, Milano, Mondadori, 1999.
- Libro azzurro e lunare, in Alberto Caramella, Lunares Murales, Firenze, Le Lettere, 1999, pp. VII-XIII.
- Poesie 1965-2000, postfazione di Alba Donati, Milano, Mondadori ("Oscar poesia del Novecento"), 2001.
- Per un secondo o un secolo, Milano, Mondadori ("Lo specchio"), 2003.
- Il viaggiatore di città, Faloppio, Lietocolle ("Il Graal"), 2004.
- Il rosso e l'azzurro, Milano, Quaderni di Orfeo ("Ottavo"), 2006.
- Il denaro e gli oggetti (con William Xerra), Milano, Il Faggio ("Ariele"), 2006
- L'ultima volta che vidi Parigi, con un'acquaforte originale di Luciano Ragozzino, Milano, Il ragazzo innocuo ("Fuori collana"), 2007
- Jeanne d'Arc e il suo doppio, Milano, Guanda ("Fenice contemporanea"), 2008
- Come una nave, Salerno, Edizioni L'Arca Felice ("Coincidenze"), 2008
- Vite pulviscolari, Milano: Mondadori ("Lo specchio"), 2009
- Verso una quiete naturale, con un'acquaforte originale dell'autore, Milano, Il ragazzo innocuo ("Scripsit-Sculpsit"), 2010
- Malaspina, Milano, Mondadori ("Lo specchio"), 2013
- Un'isola un profilo, con un'opera originale di Adalberto Borioli, Milano, Quaderni di Orfeo ("Assolo"), 2016.
- Poesie 1963-2015, a cura di Alberto Bertoni, Milano, Mondadori, 2016.

=== Novels ===
- Il male è nelle cose, Milano, Mondadori ("Scrittori italiani e stranieri").
- La traversata di Milano, Milano, Mondadori ("Scrittori italiani e stranieri"), 2007.
- L'onore del clochard, San Cesario di Lecce, Manni ("Chicchi"), 2009
- La maschera ritratto, Milano, Mondadori ("Scrittori italiani e stranieri"), 2011
- L'indifferenza dell'assassino, Milano, Guanda ("Narratori della Fenice"), 2012
- Il ritmo di Milano – Un indigeno turista a zonzo per la città, Milano, Meravigli edizioni ("Scorci e Memorie"), 2015
