= Tempietto di Santa Croce (Bergamo) =

Chapel in Bergamo, Italy

Coordinates: 45°42′12″N 9°39′42″E

Tempietto di Santa Croce of Italy
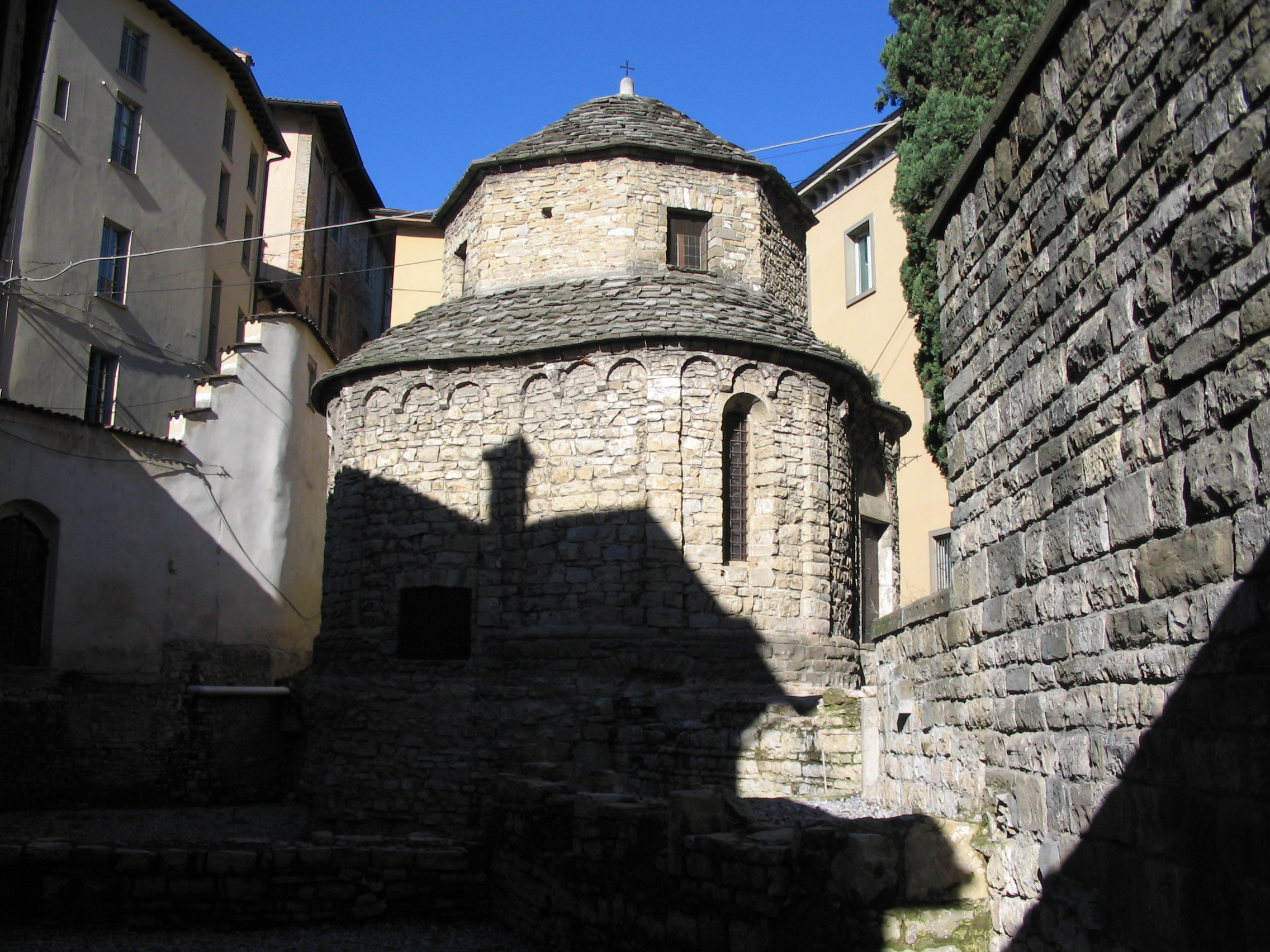

Religion
- Affiliation: Roman Catholic

Location
- Location: Bergamo, Italy
- Interactive map of Tempietto di Santa Croce of Italy

Architecture
- Type: Sanctuary Chapel
- Style: Romanesque
- Groundbreaking: 11th century
- Completed: 11th century

The Tempietto di Santa Croce is a small octagonal Romanesque chapel found in the upper city of Bergamo, near the Santa Maria Maggiore. The original building was constructed in the first half of the 11th century, though first documentation of the structure dates to 1133. Other Romanesque structures in the province include the Rotonda di San Tomè, the Basilica di Santa Giulia, and the Priorato di Sant'Egidio.
