= San Bernardino in Pignolo, Bergamo =

Church in Bergamo, Lombardy, Italy

Coordinates: 45°42′01″N 9°40′29″E

San Bernardino in Pignolo is a Roman Catholic church located on Via Pignolo #59, in Bergamo, region of Lombardy, Italy.

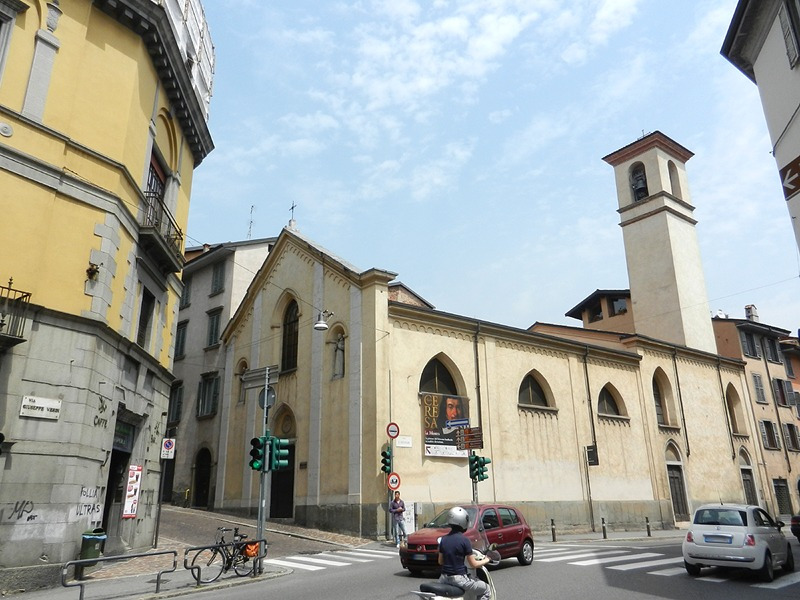
Church façade and bell-tower

== History ==
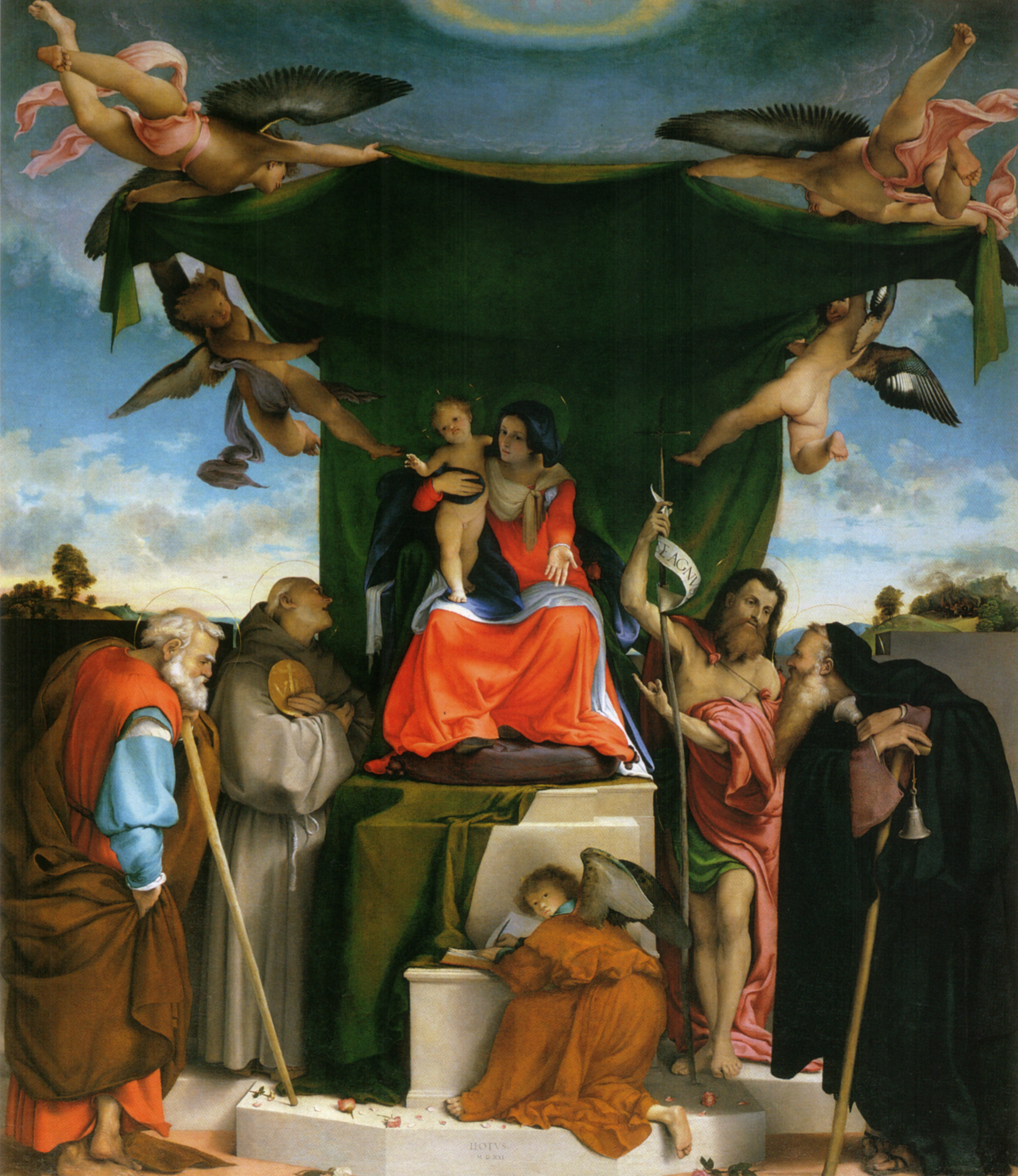
Madonna and Saints by Lorenzo Lotto.

The Franciscan friar San Bernardino of Siena had travelled to Bergamo in 1411 and founded the monastery of Santa Maria delle Grazie, Bergamo. On occasion of his canonization in 1450, this church was commissioned, and it is documented since the 1460s, affiliated with a confraternity of Flagellants, but the structure was not completed till 1561. It was assigned to the order of Dominicans but only till 1571. The church underwent extensive restorations in 1876. It has a posterior bell-tower. The facade has the IHS within sun monogram of San Bernardino.

The church is most noted for the altarpiece depicting the Madonna and Child with Saints Anthony Abbas, Joseph, John the Baptist, and Bernard (1521) by Lorenzo Lotto. On the counterfacade were paintings by Giovanni Paolo Cavagna. In the first altar on the right is a canvas depicting an Enthroned Madonna and Child (1523) by Andrea Previtali. In the second altar on the right is a 15th century canvas depicting Saints Defendente, Apollonia, and Lawrence. The church also had at a time paintings by Giovanni Battista Moroni (Sant'Alessandro della Croce), Giacomo Locati, and Francesco Cavagna.

Bergamo Arte Design cites the 2nd chapel on the right having an Enthroned Madonna with Saint Onofrius and Antony of Padua, and the 3rd chapel as once housing (now stolen) Madonna with Sts Peter and Paul by Jacopino Scipioni. The 3rd chapel on left has 19th-century frescoes depicting Life of St Antony of Padua by Giovanni Maironi da Ponte, and the 2nd chapel on the left, had the GP Cavagna altarpiece.
