= Bergamo – San Vigilio funicular =

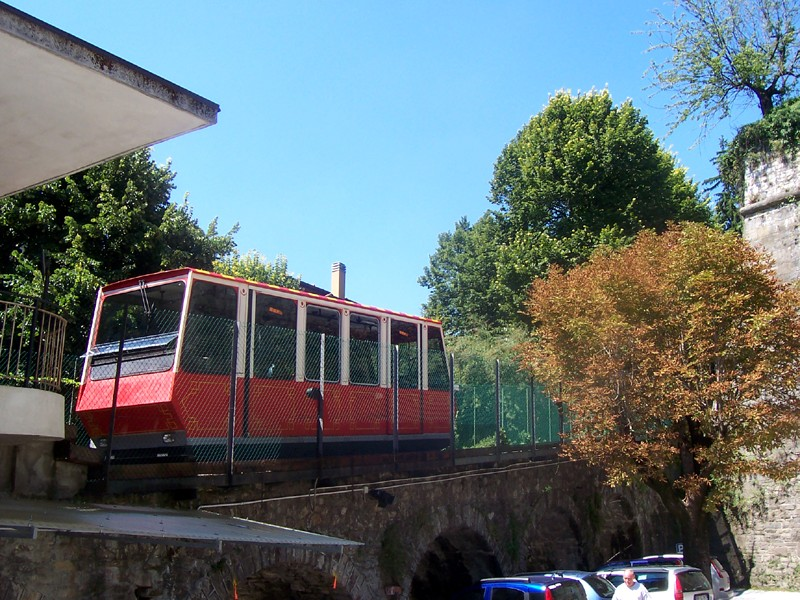

Overview
- Locale: Bergamo, Italy
- Stations: 2

Service
- Type: Funicular
- Operator(s): Azienda Trasporti Bergamo (ATB)

History
- Opened: 1912

Technical
- Track length: 630 m (2,070 ft)
- Highest elevation: 459 m (1,506 ft)

The Bergamo – San Vigilio funicular (Italian: Funicolare di Bergamo-San Vigilio) is a funicular railway connecting Bergamo's Upper City (Italian: città alta) to the top of San Vigilio hill. Another funicular, the Bergamo Upper City funicular, has its upper terminus approximately 800 m (2,600 ft) away on the opposite side of the Upper City.

The funicular opened on August 27, 1912 and was temporarily closed between 1976 and 1991. The line begins near the Sant'Alessandro Gate at the western edge of the Upper City from where it climbs 90 m (300 ft) in elevation at approximately 22% grade to San Vigilio hill. Original plans to urbanize San Vigilio were never realized and there is presently a belvedere and accommodation at the upper terminus.

Initially the funicular consisted of two cars but this was reduced to a single car with a capacity of 55 persons in 1991. Travel time for the route is 2 minutes and 40 seconds. The funicular's ticket cost is €1.30 and is integrated into the Azienda Trasporti Bergamo transit network.
