= Giovanni Michele Alberto da Carrara =

Giovanni Michele Alberto da Carrara (English: John Michael Albert) (1438–1490) was a Bergamasque Renaissance humanist and medical doctor. He wrote about philosophy, history, science, and medicine. He was also a Latin poet and orator. Despite his name, he was not a member of the Carraresi family.

Son of Guido, also a humanist and physician, Michele studied Aristotle at the University of Padua, where he earned the title of doctor physicus. As a physician, Michele ministered to the needs of citizens of Bergamo at a time when it was ravaged by plague. He was a friend of Ermolao Barbaro, who criticised insufficient knowledge of Greek.

Of Michele's known forty-two works, the Commentaria in Ciceronis Rhetoricam (before 1489) and seventeen others have been lost. In 1457, aged only nineteen, he produced Armiranda, a Latin comedy divided into acts and scenes, classical in form but contemporary political in content. From his university years there are also a series of eighteen epigrams. From two of these it is apparent that Michele saw fellow humanists Giovanni Antonio Pandoni ("Porcello") and Antonio Beccadelli ("Panormita") as rivals. De Fato et Fortuna, a prose philosophical treatise on fate and fortune, serves as an overview of his early thought and undergirds much of his later poetry. During this early period he also took to medical writing. De omnibus ingeniis augendae memoriae is a didactic treatise on mnemonic devices.

His Ad Gloriosam Virginem Mariam Suarum Calamitatum Commemoratio is an autobiographical poem in rhyming hexameters, recounting his life from infancy to his early thirties. The six Virgilian eclogues of Michele's Bucolicum Carmen are original and authentic, and include one (#2) lamenting the idle dreams which the condottieri induce in rustic youth as they pass by in all their finery. Later he wrote a panegyric for the funeral of the great Bergamasque condottiero Bartolomeo Colleoni, Oratio extemporalis habita in funere Batholomaei Coleonis. In this oration and another, the Oratio de laudibus Gabrielis Rangoni S.R.E. Cardinalis, Michele provides the historian with useful information about contemporary subjects, a mercenary and a Franciscan, Gabriele Rangone.

Among his work in natural science, there is De constitutione mundi and the encyclopaedic De choreis musarum sive de origine scientiarum. Michele also wrote a vita of Chiara da Montefalco, whose intercession had helped him in the past and whose intercession he looked forward to in the future. His vita was intended as an improvement upon that of Berengario di Donadio.

Michele's most mature writings are probably the fifteen hexametric Sermones objurgatorii, exhortative sermons. Contra hypocrisin malam deals with hypocrisy in the church, most notably the corrupt papal institutions nursed by Sixtus IV. Contra milities segnes is a mocking attack on Roberto Sanseverino d'Aragona and his milities segnes (lazy soldiers), who failed to guard the city of Cividale from the invasion of Matthias Corvinus. De instituenda Filiola was written for the education of his niece Giulia, and De sene alendo on caring for his friend's elderly father. The last is a notable Renaissance work on senility and gerontology.

Giovanni Giraldi, after two decades of study, published Michele's surviving works save thirteen in 1967 under the title Opere Scelte.
