= San Giovanni XXIII, Bergamo =

Church building in Bergamo, Italy

Coordinates: 45°41′12.6″N 9°38′21.7″E

- San Giovanni XXIII, Bergamo

History
- Consecrated: 2014

San Giovanni XXIII is a modern, Roman Catholic church attached to the new Ospedale Pope John XXIII of Bergamo, region of Lombardy, Italy. The church was designed by the architects Aymeric Zublena, Pippo and Ferdinando Traversi, and consecrated in 2014.

Behind the altar is a triptych of the Crucifixion, painted in monochrome on multiple glass layers by Andrea Mastrovito. In the center a peacock is at the feet of the crucifix with tail furled. In the right panel, Pope John XXIII comforts a photographic panel of mourners. The concrete on the walls has a monochrome fresco pattern suggestive of a leafy forest, made by Stefano Arienti. The artist Ferrario Frères has created a Via Crucis based on a Hans Memling painting.
