= Redona =

Neighborhood in the Italian city of Bergamo

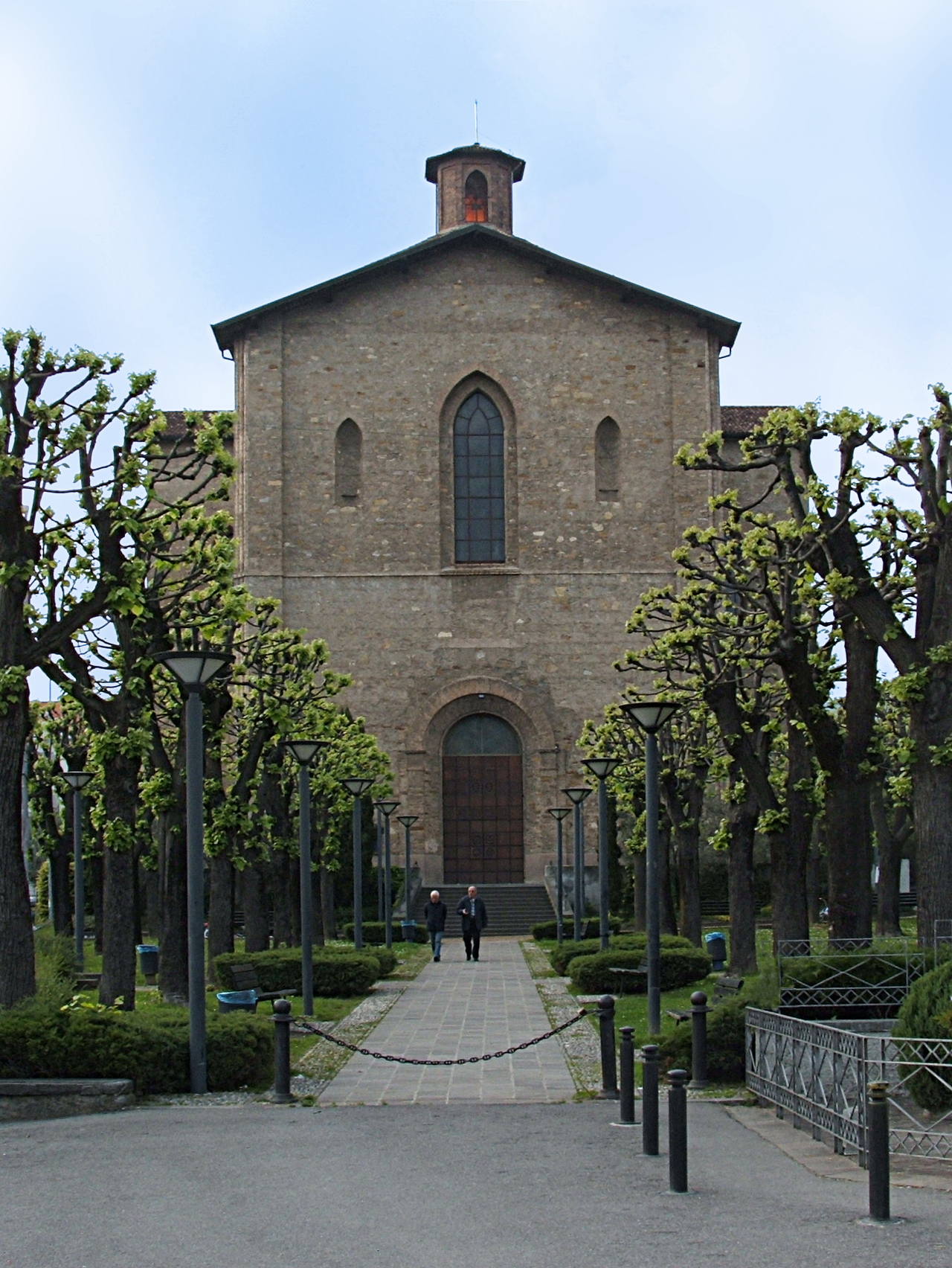
Saint Lawrence Church in Redona

Redona, is a quarter of the Italian city of Bergamo in Lombardy. Until 1927, when it was annexed to the city, Redona was an independent municipality (Italian: comune). The higher elevations of land in Redona, on the shoulder of the Maresana hill, are covered with chestnut trees. Redona, which had a population of approximately 5000 in 2007, borders the municipalities of Torre Boldone and Gorle.

== Notes ==
45°42′39″N 9°41′50″E
