= Bergamo Funicular railway Upper Town – Lower Town =

Funicular Railway Upper City – Lower City
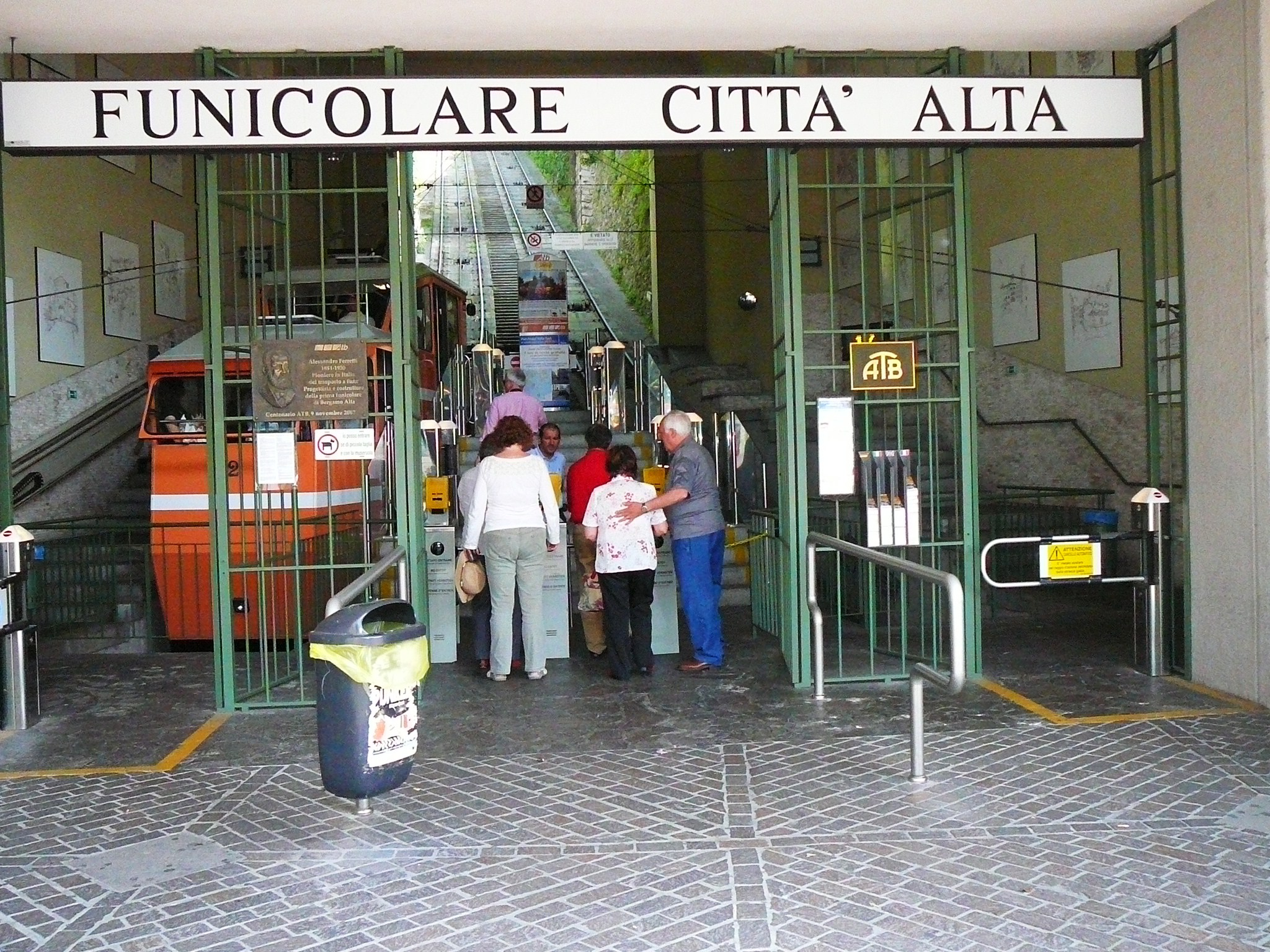
- Lower Town Station
- Interactive map of the Funicular Railway Upper City – Lower City area

General information
- Type: Funicular
- Location: Bergamo, Italy
- Coordinates: 45.7018°N 9.6654°E

Technical details
- Material: Steel

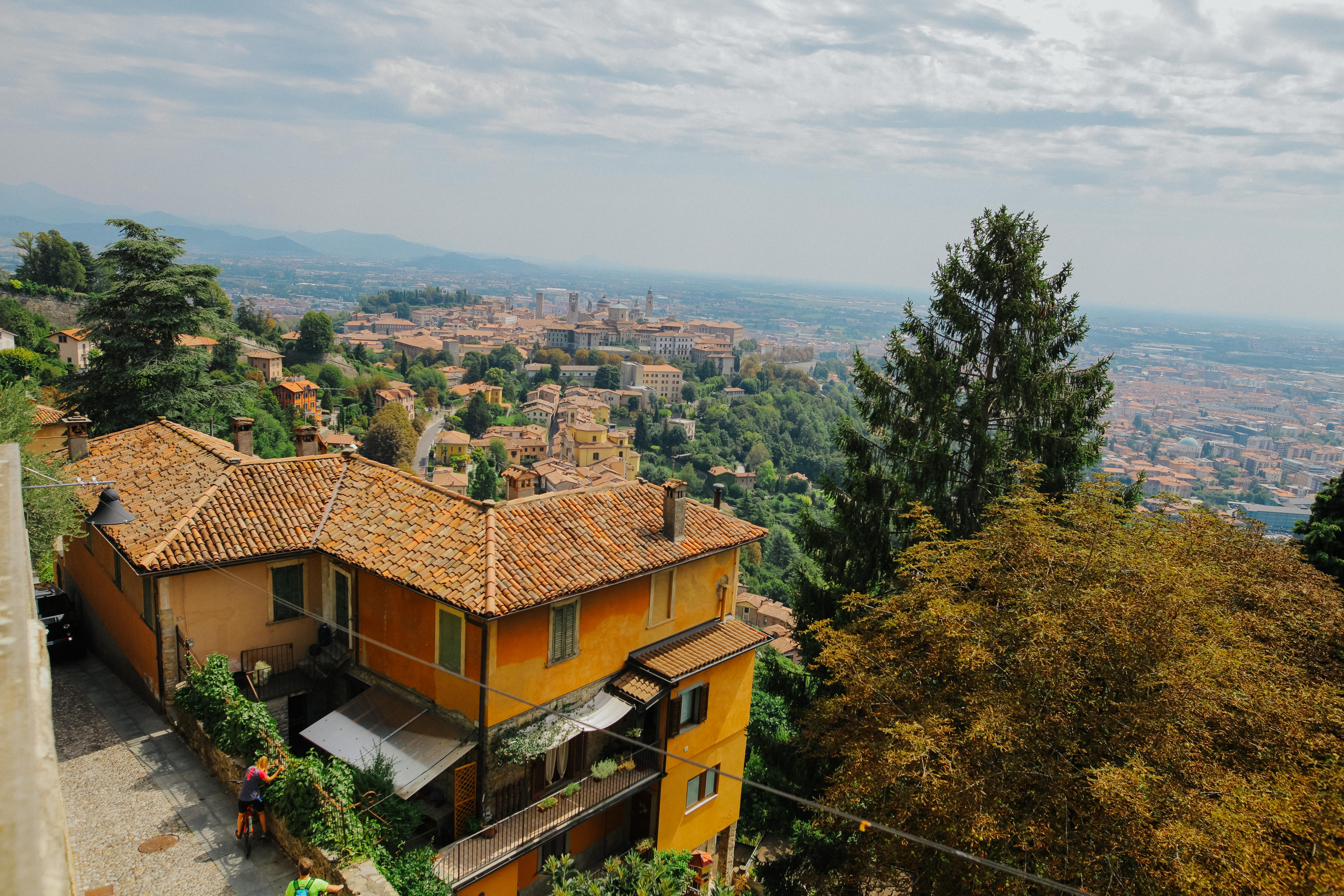
The first thing you will see after using the funicular. View of the city of Bergamo, Italy.

The Funicular Railway Upper City – Lower City (Italian: Funicolare Città Alta), is a funicular railway line in the city of Bergamo, Italy. It connects the historic core of città alta (the suspended fortified city of Bergamo built up on a hill) with the città bassa (the financial lower city). Built in 1887, it is one of the two funicular lines serving the city of Bergamo, the other being the Bergamo – San Vigilio funicular.

== Features ==
The twin track funicular railway of Bergamo owns a peculiarity: the tracks have different lengths (right 240 m and left 234 m). The difference in height is 85 meters, with a maximum gradient of 52%.

The lower funicular station, located at 271 meters above sea level, is served by the ATB bus network, as well as the one at the high city, which is 356 meters of height. The journey time is 2 minute. The lower station is called Lower Town (città bassa) of Bergamo, the upper being the Upper Town (città alta).
