= Fausto Martelli =

Italian physicist (born 1982)

- Born: 27 March 1982 (age 44); Bergamo
- Citizenship: Italian
- Education: University of Milan; Ecole normale superieure
- Known for: Liquid-liquid critical point in water Glasses; Ferroelectric Glassy Water
- Awards: Fellow of the Royal Society of Chemistry; Fellow of the Institute of Physics
- Scientific career
- Fields: Computational physics Condensed matter physics Theoretical Chemistry
- Workplaces: IBM Research; Princeton University; University of Manchester
- Academic advisors: Roberto Car
- Website: https://research.ibm.com/people/fausto-martelli

Fausto Martelli (born 27 March 1982) is an Italian physicist based in the United Kingdom. He is a senior research scientist at IBM Research Europe since 2018 and Honorary Lecturer at the University of Manchester since 2022. He previously held a position of faculty associate researcher at the Department of Chemistry, Princeton University. His background is in the physics and chemistry of disordered materials with a focus on the properties of soft matter.

Born on 27 March 1982 in Bergamo, Italy, he obtained his undergraduate degree from the University of Milan.

== Early life and education ==
Martelli was born in Bergamo in 1982. He graduated from the University of Milan in 2005 and obtained his PhD from the same institution in 2010 on a joint project with the Ecole normale superieure of Paris. Martelli spent two years as a researcher at the University of Evry and five years at Princeton University. In 2018 he was appointed at IBM Research. He was elected Benjamin Meaker Visiting Professor at the University of Bristol in 2019, where he gave a public talk on the anomalous behaviours of water, and Honorary Lecturer from the University of Manchester in 2022.

== Honors and awards ==
Martelli is fellow of the Institute of Physics and fellow of the Royal Society of Chemistry. Martelli is an IBM Senior Inventor, a title awarded by IBM in recognition of proficiency in the patent process, mentoring other IBMers in the patent process, adding value to IBM's portfolio and innovation leadership and service. Martelli was Benjamin Meaker Visiting Professor at the University of Bristol and is Honorary Lecturer at the University of Manchester.

== Work ==
Martelli's work span from supercooled liquids and glasses to biological physics. His work include:

- Palmer, J. C., Martelli, F., Liu, Y., Car, R., Panagiotopoulos, A. Z., & Debenedetti, P. G. (2014). Metastable liquid–liquid transition in a molecular model of water. Nature, 510(7505), 385–388.
- Martelli, F., Torquato, S., Giovambattista, N., & Car, R. (2017). Large-scale structure and hyperuniformity of amorphous ices. Physical review letters, 119(13), 136002.
- Martelli, F., Ko, H. Y., Oğuz, E. C., & Car, R. (2018). Local-order metric for condensed-phase environments. Physical Review B, 97(6), 064105.
- Zhang, G., Martelli, F., & Torquato, S. (2018). The structure factor of primes. Journal of Physics A: Mathematical and Theoretical, 51(11), 115001.
- Martelli, F. (2019). Unravelling the contribution of local structures to the anomalies of water: The synergistic action of several factors. The Journal of chemical physics, 150(9), 094506.
- Martelli, F., Crain, J., & Franzese, G. (2020). Network topology in water nanoconfined between phospholipid membranes. ACS nano, 14(7), 8616-8623.
- Martelli, F., Leoni, F., Sciortino, F., & Russo, J. (2020). Connection between liquid and non-crystalline solid phases in water. The Journal of Chemical Physics, 153(10), 104503.
- Martelli, F. (2021). Topology and complexity of the hydrogen bond network in classical models of water. Journal of Molecular Liquids, 329, 115530.
- Wei, Z., Chiricotto, M., Elliott, J. D., Martelli, F., & Carbone, P. (2022). Wettability of graphite under 2D confinement. Carbon, 198, 132-141
- Martelli, F. (2022). Steady-like topology of the dynamical hydrogen bond network in supercooled water. PNAS Nexus, 1(3), pgac090
- Cassone, G. & Martelli, F. (2024). Electrofreezing of liquid water at ambient conditions. Nature Communications, 15(1856)
