= Valverde, Bergamo =

Quarter of Bergamo, Lombardy, Italy

Coordinates: 45°42′38″N 9°39′52″E

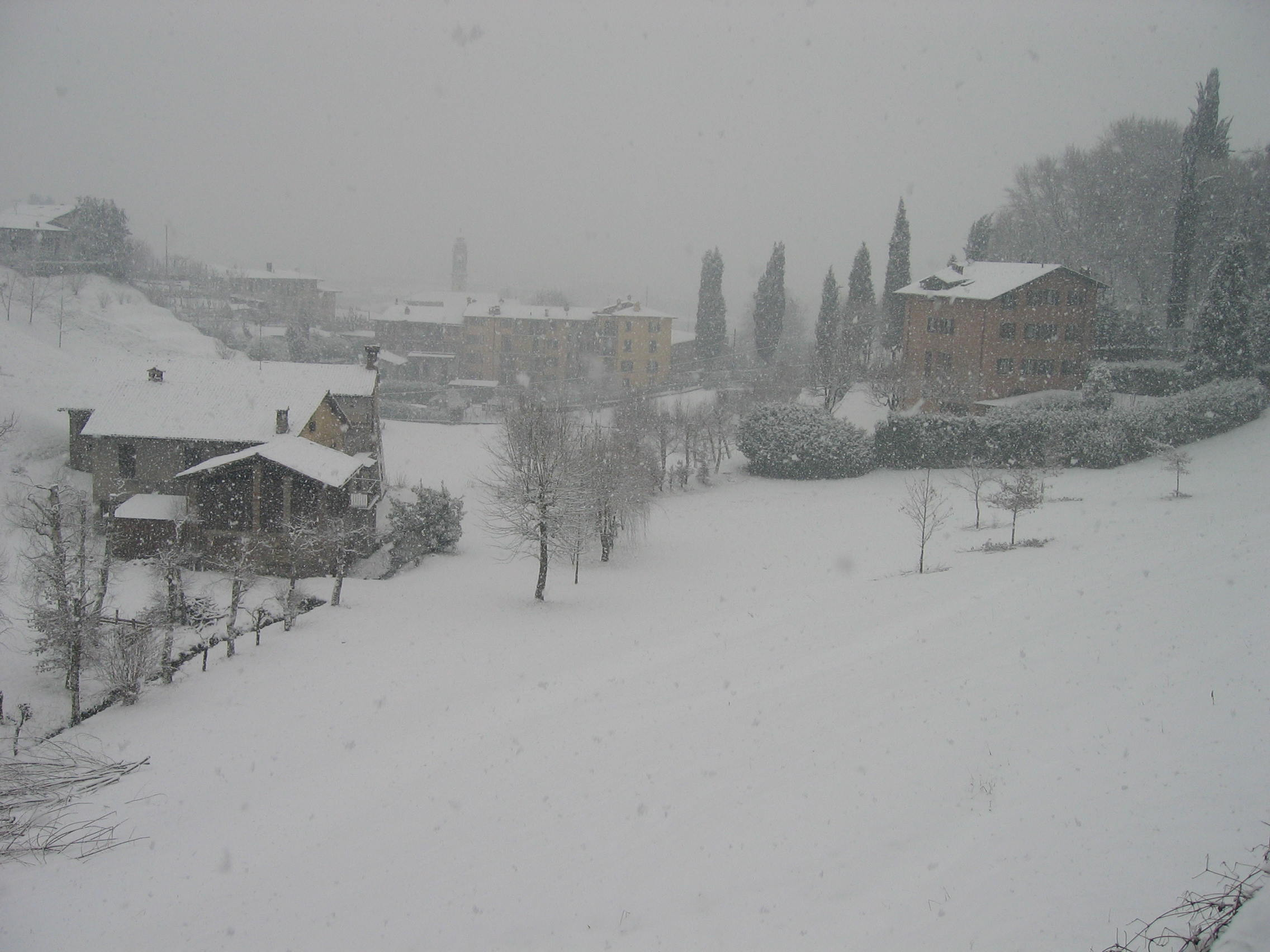
A view of Valverde under the snow

Valverde is a quarter in the city of Bergamo, located on the north side of the hill of the città alta. It has a population of 3,775 as of 1 February 2018.

It contains a Roman Catholic parish with a church dedicated to the Assumption of the Virgin Mary. The parish church was damaged by a blaze in November 2006.

The Castello di Valverde in its present form is a 16th-century structure on the site of a medieval castle.

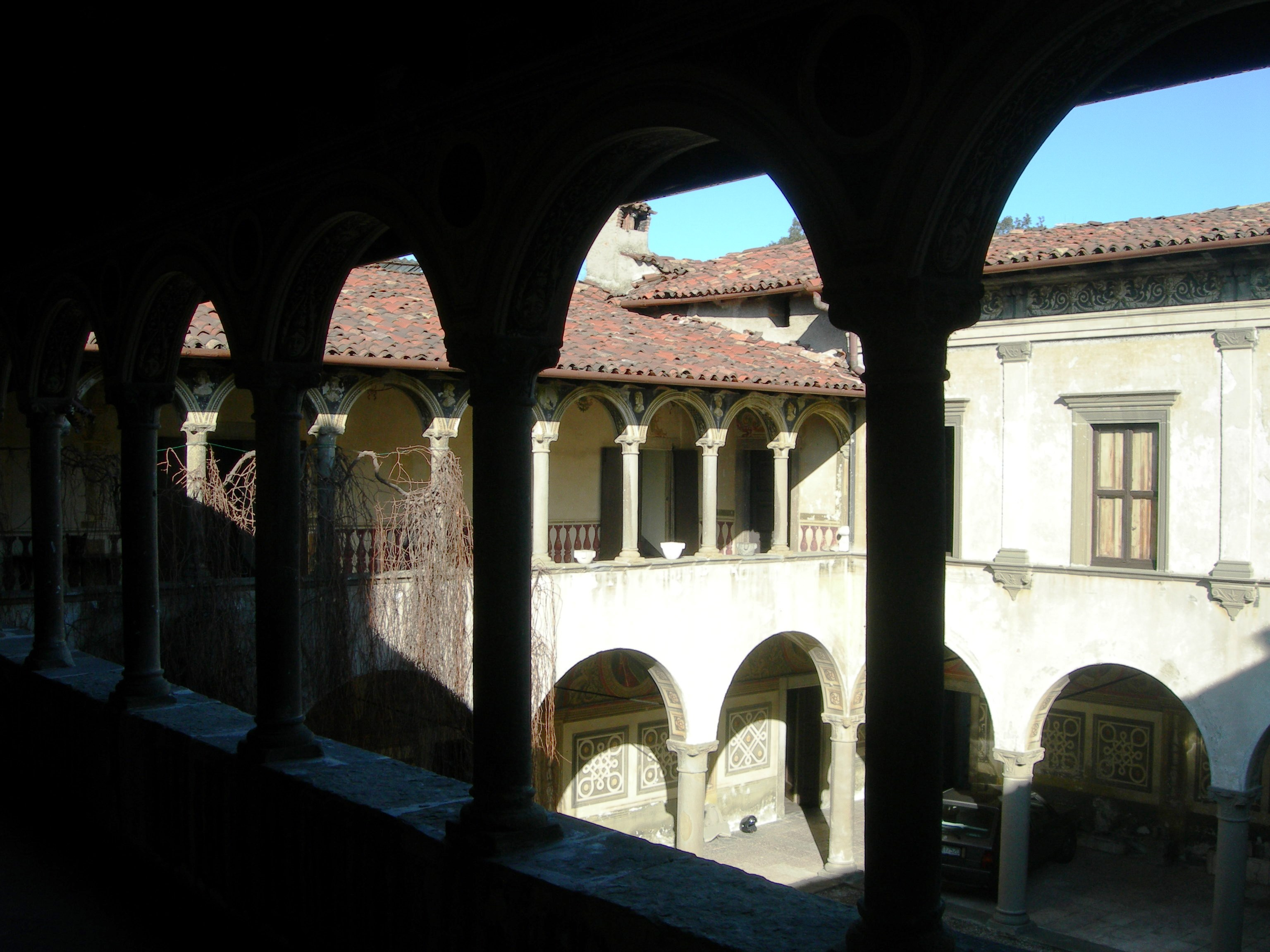
Courtyard in the Castello di Valverde

== Sources ==
- "Valverde, nome azzeccatissimo". Bergamo News, 17 September 2019
