= Alberto Bertoni =

Italian university teacher and writer

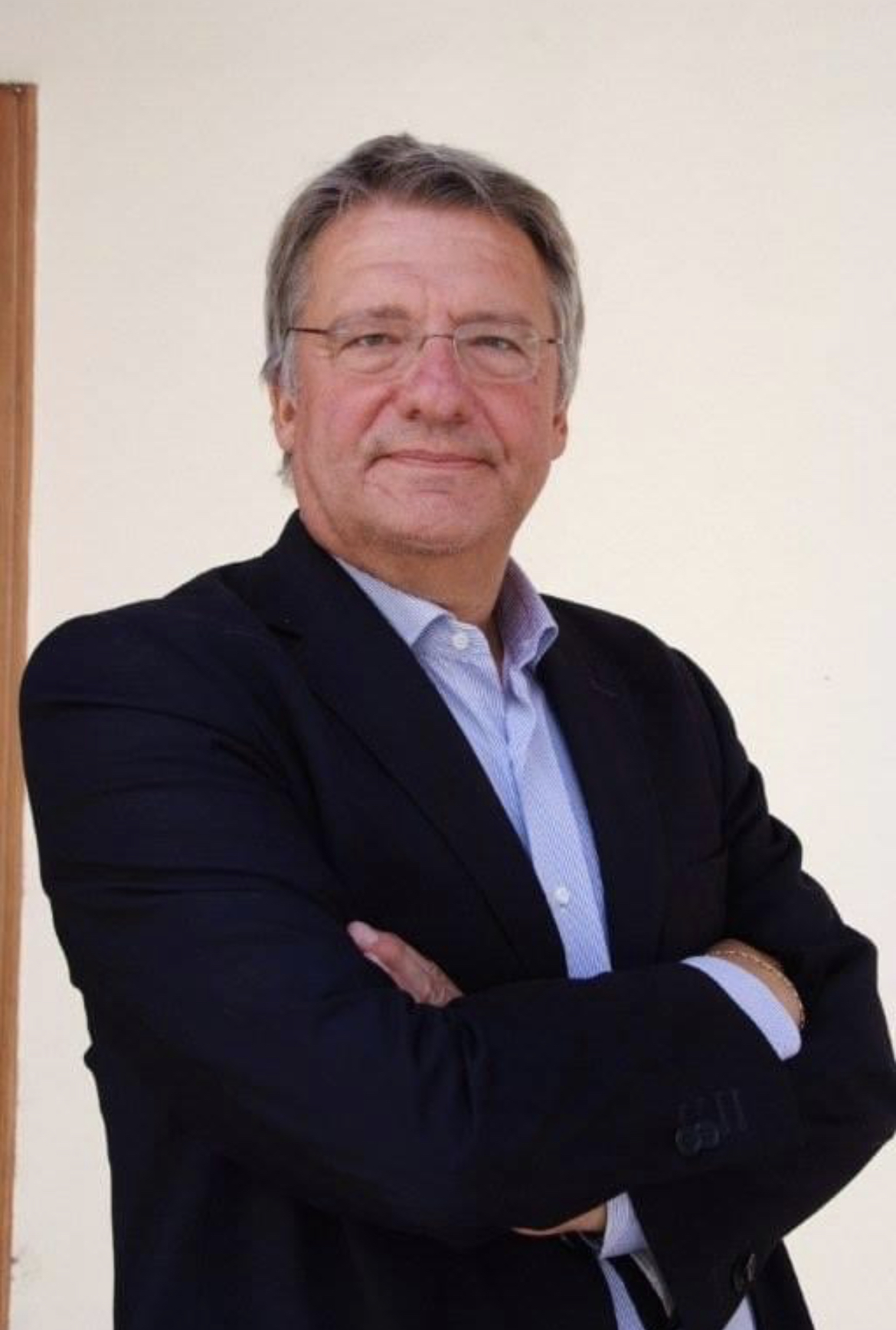
- Bertoni
- Born: 23 March 1995; Modena
- Occupations: Poet; Literary critic; Professor

Alberto Bertoni (born 1955) is an Italian poet, literary critic, and professor at Università degli Studi di Bologna.

== Career ==
Bertoni was born in Modena and has been teaching Italian literature at Bologna University since 1993.
