= Francesco Cucchi =

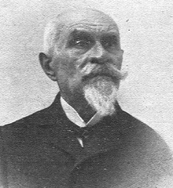
- Born: 17 December 1834; Bergamo, Kingdom of Lombardy–Venetia
- Died: 10 January 1913 (aged 86); Rome, Italy
- Movement: Il Risorgimento (Unification of Italy)

Francesco Cucchi (17 December 1834 – 1 October 1913) was an Italian patriot soldier who joined Giuseppe Garibaldi in his Expedition of the Thousand, and later in other wars for the unification of Italy. In 1892, he was named a Senator of the kingdom.

Francesco was born in Bergamo to a wealthy family, and in joined as a volunteer in Garibaldi's Cacciatori delle Alpi, and fought in Sicily but was wounded as the army entered Palermo. Afterwards he was allied with Savoy monarchy in various missions, but in 1867 joined the forces of Garibaldi again in Rome, but fled after the massacre of the lanificio Aiani (or Casa Tavani Arquati).
