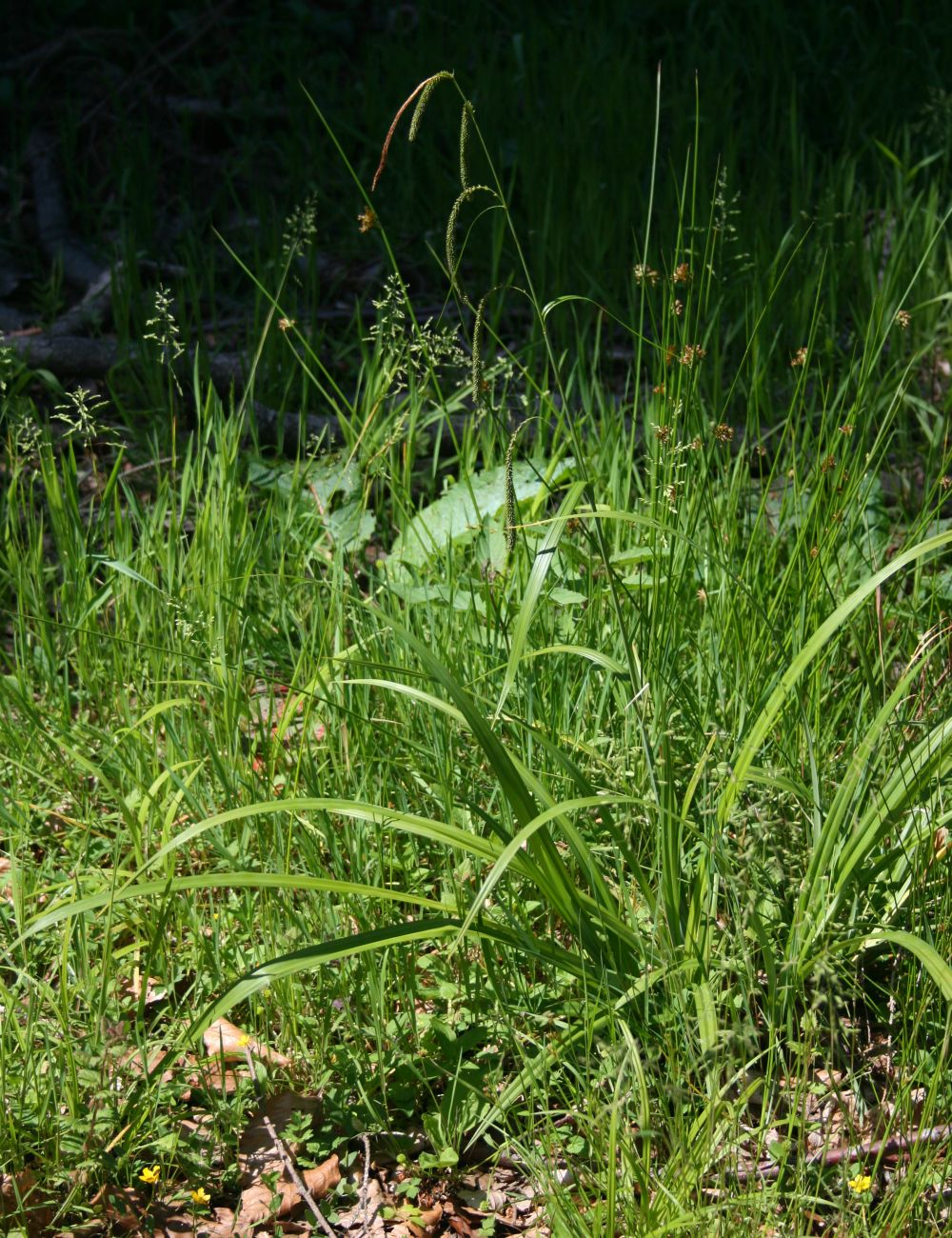

Scientific classification
- Kingdom: Plantae
- Clade: Tracheophytes
- Clade: Angiosperms
- Clade: Monocots
- Clade: Commelinids
- Order: Poales
- Family: Cyperaceae
- Genus: Carex
- Species: C. pendula

Binomial name
- Carex pendula Huds.

= Carex pendula =

Species of grass-like plant

Carex pendula (pendulous sedge, also known as hanging, drooping or weeping sedge) is a large sedge of the genus Carex. It occurs in woodland, scrubland, hedges and beside streams, preferring damp, heavy clay soils. It is sometimes grown as a garden plant because of its distinctive appearance.

It is native to western, central and southern parts of Europe occurring north to Sweden, Denmark and parts of Scotland where it reaches 58° N. It is also found in north-west Africa, the Azores, Madeira and parts of the Middle East.

== Description ==
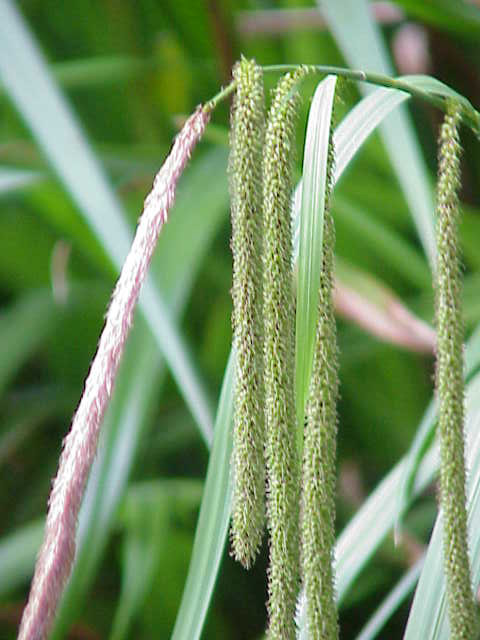
Inflorescence: one male spike (left) and four female spikes

Carex pendula is a tall, perennial plant which forms large, dense tufts. It can grow to 1.8 metres, occasionally reaching 2.4 metres. The smooth stems are triangular in cross-section with rounded angles. The long, hairless leaves are yellowish-green above and glaucous below. They are 8–20 mm wide. The simple flowers are borne on long, drooping, catkin-like spikes. There are 1–2 male spikes at the top of the stem with usually 4–5 female spikes below them. The male spikes are 55–160 mm long while the females spikes are 50–260 mm long and 5–7 mm wide. The fruits are green-brown and 3–5 mm long with a 1–2.5-mm beak. The plant typically flowers from May to June and fruits from June to July.

It has been introduced to New Zealand and has begun to spread into the wild in the United States, where it has been recorded from Washington, Virginia, and California.
