= Gorle, Lombardy =

Gorle
- Comune
- Comune di Gorle
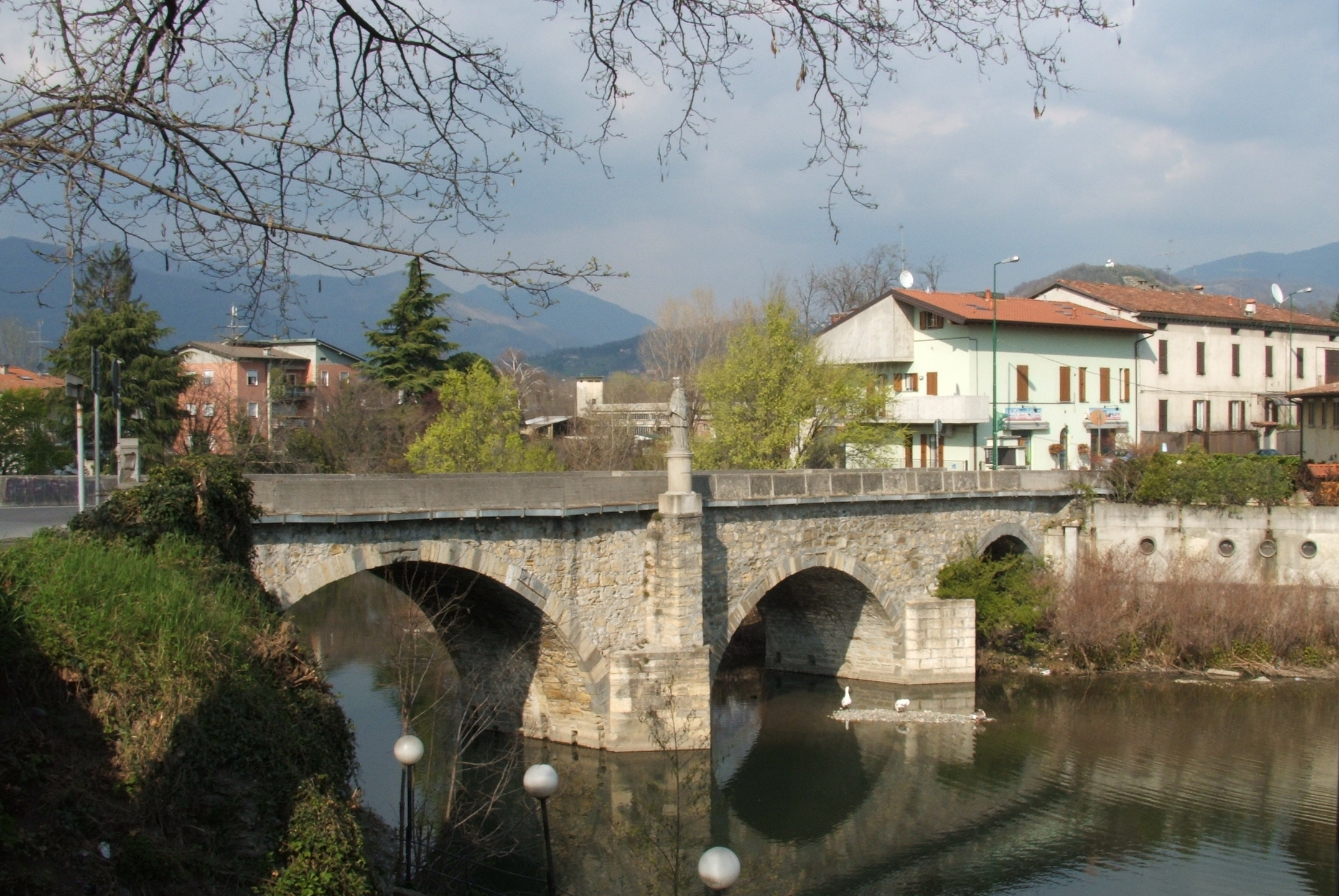
- Bridge over the Serio River

- Location within Italy Location within Lombardy
- Coordinates: 45°42′14″N 9°43′09″E
- Country: Italy
- Region: Lombardy
- Province: Province of Bergamo (BG)

Area
  - Total: 2.4 km^{2} (0.93 sq mi)
- Elevation: 268 m (879 ft)

Population (Dec. 2004)
  - Total: 5,506
  - Density: 2,300/km^{2} (5,900/sq mi)
- Demonym: Gorlesi
- Time zone: UTC+1 (CET)
  - Summer (DST): UTC+2 (CEST)
- Postal code: 24020
- Dialing code: 035

Gorle (Bergamasque: Górel) is a comune (municipality) in the Province of Bergamo in the Italian region of Lombardy, located about 50 kilometres (31 mi) northeast of Milan and about 4 kilometres (2 mi) east of Bergamo. As of 31 December 2004, it had a population of 5,506 and an area of 2.4 square kilometres (0.93 mi^{2}).

Gorle borders the following municipalities: Bergamo, Pedrengo, Ranica, Scanzorosciate, Seriate, Torre Boldone.

== Demographic evolution ==
Historical population

Year	Pop.	±%
1861	352	—
1871	359	+2.0%
1881	391	+8.9%
1901	460	+17.6%
1911	482	+4.8%

Year	Pop.	±%
1921	536	+11.2%
1931	554	+3.4%
1936	581	+4.9%
1951	715	+23.1%
1961	1,511	+111.3%

Year	Pop.	±%
1971	2,245	+48.6%
1981	3,714	+65.4%
1991	4,388	+18.1%
2001	5,063	+15.4%

Source: Data from ISTAT
