= Panizza =

Panizza is an Italian surname. Notable people with the surname include:

- Bartolomeo Panizza (1785–1867), Italian anatomist
- Darrell Panizza (born 1959), Australian footballer and coach
- Ettore Panizza (1875–1967), Argentine conductor and composer
- Giacomo Panizza (1804–1860), Italian conductor
- John Panizza (1931–1997), Australian politician
- Oskar Panizza (1853–1921), German psychiatrist and author
- Serge Panizza (1942–2016), French fencer
- Ugo Panizza, Italian economist
- Wladimiro Panizza (1945–2002), Italian bicycle racer
- Zane Panizza German/Egyptian musician

== See also ==
- Foramen of Panizza
