= Morla =

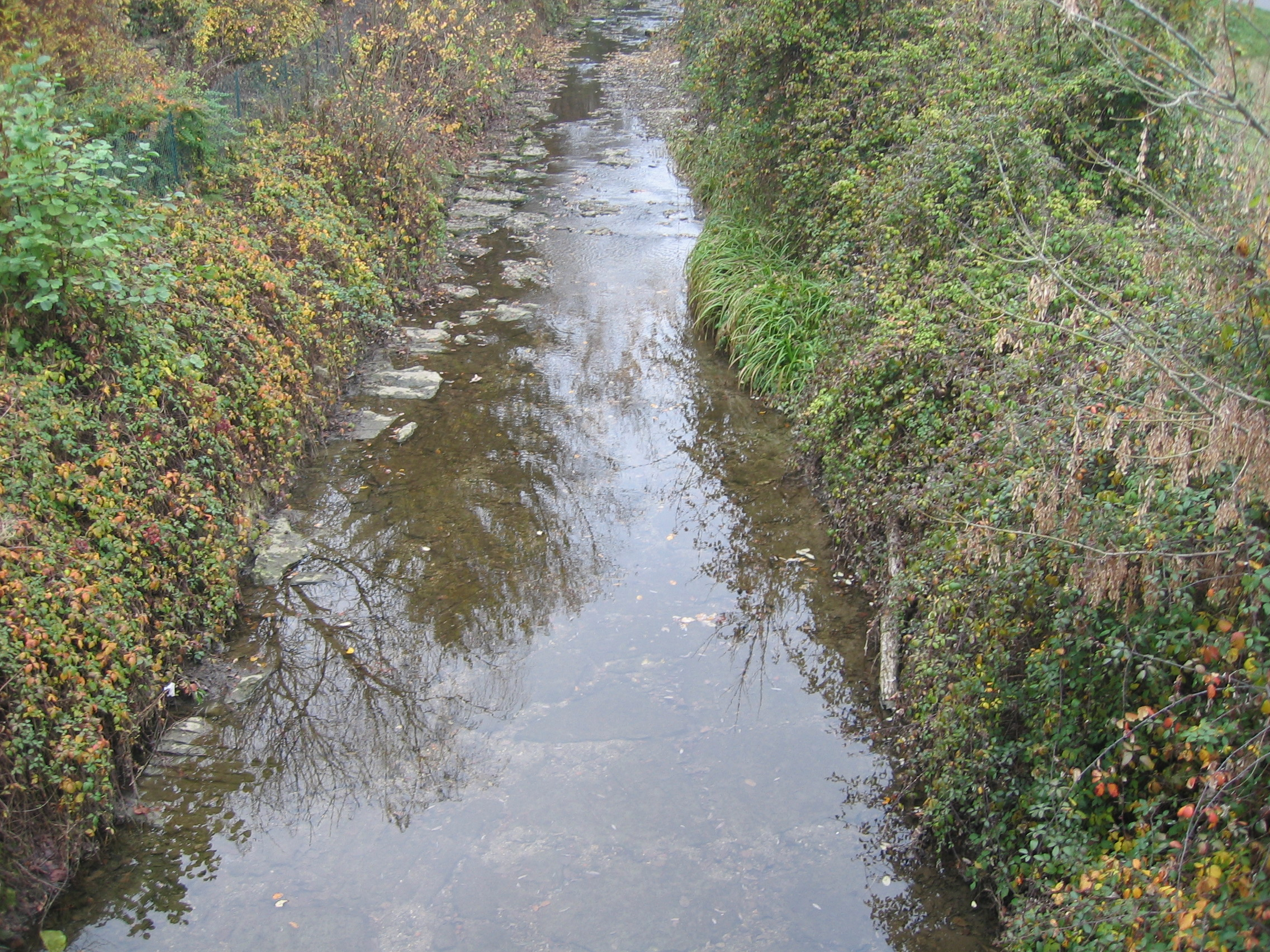
- Morla near Valtesse

Location
- Country: Italy

Physical characteristics
- Source
  - location: Maresana Hill
- Mouth: Serio
  - coordinates: 45.6666°N 9.7293°E
- Length: 14 km (8.7 mi)
- Basin size: 26 km^{2} (10 sq mi)
- Discharge
  - average: 10 m^{3}/s (350 cu ft/s)

Basin features
- Progression: Serio→ Adda→ Po→ Adriatic Sea

Morla is a 16 km long river in province of Bergamo. Its source is located in Maresana in the municipality of Ponteranica, then Morla crosses the city of Bergamo, after Bergamo part of its waters are used in agriculture. One branch flows into the Serio near Orio al Serio.
