= Filippo Lussana =

Italian physiologist

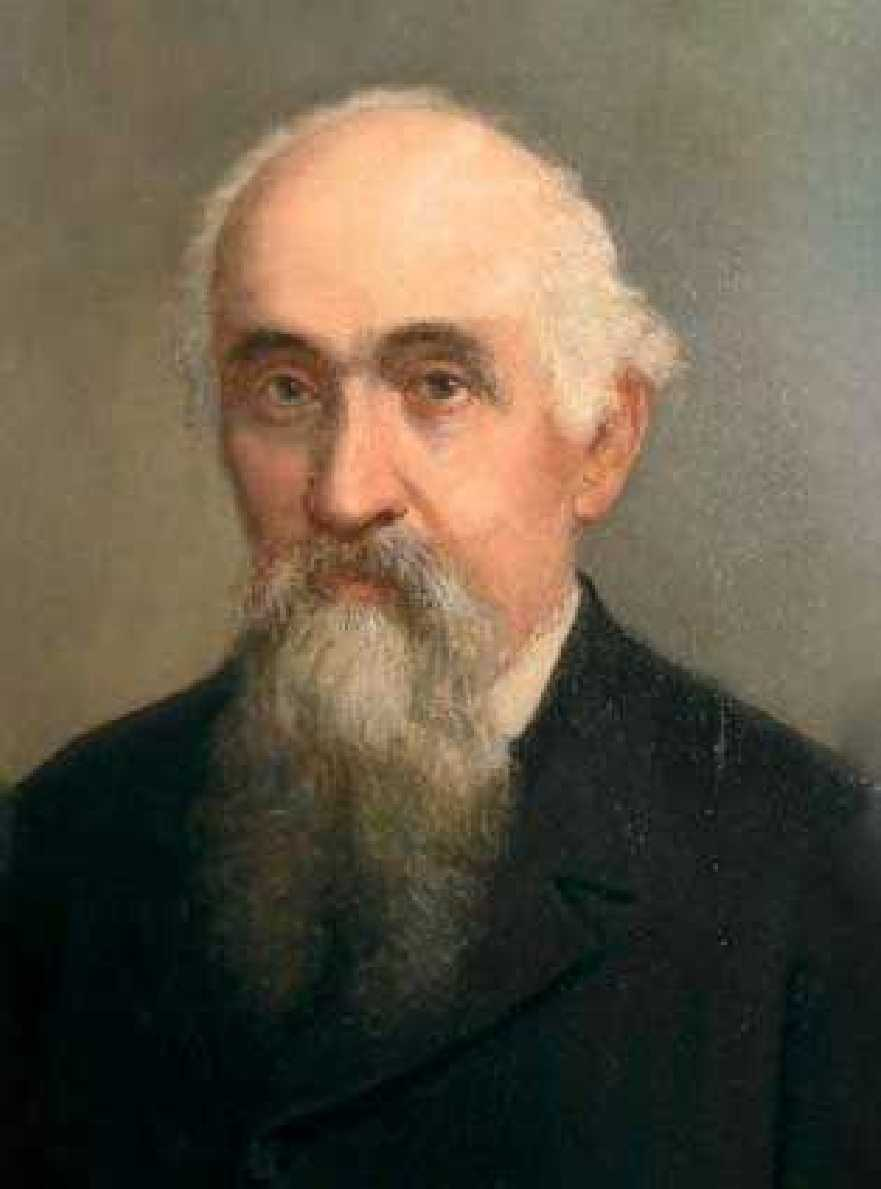
- Born: 17 December 1820; Cenate Sopra
- Died: 25 December 1897 (aged 77); Cenate Sotto
- Occupation: Physiologist
- Known for: Nervous system research

Filippo Lussana (17 December 1820 – 25 December 1897) was an Italian physiologist. His medical research addressed the laws of nutrition, the functions of the nervous system, cerebral localization, gustatory innervation, the relationship between touch and pain, and the causes of dizziness and pellagra. Lussana authored more than two hundred scientific publications and received two gold medals from the Royal Society of Medical Sciences and Natural Sciences in Brussels and the Royal Academy of Medicine of Belgium for his studies on "Fiber and Blood" and "Monograph on the Encephalic Centers".

In addition to his scientific work, Lussana was also a writer, painter, and poet. He sought to combine art and science, exploring the dialectical relationship between imagination and analysis to achieve a rational synthesis.

== Life ==
Filippo Lussana was born in Cenate Sopra, in Valpredina, on 17 December 1820, the son of Felice Lussana and Barbara Epis. His hometown was in the province of Bergamo, then part of the Habsburg Kingdom of Lombardy–Venetia. After elementary school, he attended the "Angelo Mai" college in Clusone in Val Seriana, where he acquired a solid foundation in Latin and classical studies.

Upon the death of Francis II, Holy Roman Emperor in 1835, the rhetoric assignment for students was entitled "The Roman Caesar and the Austrian Caesar". At age fifteen, Lussana wrote, "The triumphant Roman Caesar forgave all his enemies; the Austrian Caesar imprisoned them in Spielberg." For this perceived sacrilegious abuse of authority, he was confined to his room for three days on a bread-and-water diet. Shortly after, he was summoned to the rector Cantelli, who asked him the source of his ideas. Lussana explained that he had read My Prisons by Silvio Pellico, after which the rector forgave the young scholar.

Between 1839 and 1844, Lussana attended the Faculty of Medicine at the University of Pavia. He was a pupil of Bartolomeo Panizza, who encouraged him to pursue scientific research. His dissertation focused on identifying the causative agent in poisoning, and the following year a paper by Lussana on "Creosote as a cause of poisoning in smoked meat products" was published in the Annals of Medicine.

After graduating in 1844, Lussana practiced medicine in several locations in Bergamo: San Pellegrino Terme, Zogno, Mologno in Casazza, and finally Gandino. In 1848, he joined the Medical Commission of the national army of the Provisional Government of Lombardy. He observed the Cholera epidemic in Gandino in 1855, co-authoring a report with his brother Peter. In 1859, he served as a medical officer among the volunteers of the Gandino military. Leading up to the Italian unification of 1860, while practicing as a physician, he also wrote over forty scientific works.

In 1860, Lussana was appointed Professor of Physiology at the University of Parma, succeeding G. Albini. In 1867, he transferred to the University of Padua, where he served as Professor of Anatomy and Physiology until 1889, when he retired due to health reasons and was named professor emeritus. His retirement was caused by an infection that was destroying his jawbone. He moved to Cenate Sotto, near his hometown, where he served as mayor for three years, from 1894 to 1897. He died on 25 December 1897.

== Work ==
Lussana became involved in physiology at a time when the study of this discipline was declining in Italy, and in an isolated area like Gandino, where as a pupil of Bartolomeo Panizza he did not have a school or a laboratory. For Lussana physiology was a discipline in its own right and not just a complement to anatomy. He understood the importance of comparative anatomy in its application to issues of physiology. Building on his field experience as doctor, he was able to originate and elaborate general and original concepts. His publications were widely reported in Italy and abroad, contributing to the deepening of physiological research.

=== Physiology of pain ===
Lussana published a book on the Physiology of pain in 1859, (Note: Fisiologia del dolore) dedicating it to Paolo Mantegazza, who was later to write his own book on the subject. Lussana distinguished mental and physical pain. The one is derived from the intellect and may affect the body, while the other is derived from the body and may affects the intellect. He gave as examples the statue of Laocoön and the painting of Mary in Michelangelo's "Last Judgement". Similarly, he contrasted the frenzy and fury of Hercules described by Ovid with the pain of Count Ugolino of Dante.

=== Studies on the brain and nerve centers ===
In the essay "Study program on the physiology of the nervous system" (1851), Lussana anticipates the more precise demonstration of Paul Broca on the location of the language centers of the brain. Lussana presents the case of a patient with loss of articulate speech as a result of an injury to the skull, and recovery of the same after the removal of bone fragments from that brain region. In 1853 he had the opportunity to attend along a young man with cancer of the cerebellum, publishing observations on the physiology of that organ ("The pathology of the cerebellum", Milan, 1856 (Note: Alcune osservazioni fisio-patologiche su'l sistema nervoso)). Studying the origin of vertigo, Lussana shows the importance of the coordinating function of the brain, emphasizing how the sensations of the muscles, sight and hearing are necessary to regulate movements ("Monograph of dizziness", Milan 1858) His study on muscle sense contributed to understanding of the part played by the cerebellum in balance, which provided a basis for later studies by Luigi Luciani on this organ.

=== Physiology of language and physiological alphabet ===
Continuing his studies on the physiology of language, Lussana tried to explain the physiological relationship to graphics of numbers and letters. He questioned the necessity of the decimal system and the figures of Roman and Arabic numerals. Finally, in the essay "Physiological Alphabet" he provided evidence to codify a language that is a result of physiology and anatomy of the human brain, and therefore the same for all languages, as already proposed at the time by Voltaire. Going on to study facial expressions, Lussana challenged art and science, trying to explain the different expressions that are related to the emotions and passions.

=== Sounds, colors and tastes ===
His hobby as a painter made Lussana interested in perception of color. Lussana stated that the language of color is innate and not learned, and demonstrated the existence of a natural relationship between emotions and colors. In this he perhaps anticipated Kandinsky. He was one of the pioneers of the concept of "colored hearing" considered as a foundation for creativity based on studies of the music of his age. Even color and sound vibrations would be related, and he related Newton's seven intervals of the solar spectrum to the seven tones of the musical scale.

In 1865 Lussana published a paper under the pseudonym of "Filinto" called Lettere di Fisiologia morale dei colori (Letters on the moral physiology of colors). He introduced the concept of a language of colors, and explained the Synesthesia of color and hearing based on Isaac Newton's theory of sound and color. In his view, given in more detail in an 1873 paper, (Note: Fisiologia dei colori) lights rays followed the optic nerves to the optic thalamus, where they were converted into sensations, and then to an area in the third frontal cerebral convolution where they became ideas. This area was connected to a center of language, as was an area that handled sounds, and both types of vibration could be converted into emotions.

Concerning hearing, Lussana argues that auditory vertigo, a disorder of the movements of the head and body, is due to a lesion of the semicircular canals, because the victim cannot perceive the direction of sounds ("The semicircular canals and the vertigo of Meniere", Naples 1891). As for flavors, Lussana notes that the bitter taste is perceived on the back of the tongue, sweet on the tip, sour and salty at its edges ("innervation of taste".)

=== Maize and pellagra ===
Filippo Lussana was among the most important observers of pellagra. In a paper published in Milan in 1856 (Note: Su la pellagra, memoria dei dottori Filippo Lussana e Carlo Frua) Lussana and Carlo Frua stated clearly (and accurately), "It is our hypothesis that pellagra originates and prolifierates whenever the diet lacks protein (nitrogenous substance)." Lussana and Frua said that the protein content of corn was only 12%, and well below the level needed for health. In fact, the protein level was even lower. Admitting that they did not understand the details of the physiological mechanisms, they maintained that the pellagra crisis differed from historical food crises since it stemmed from lack of protein rather than lack of calories.

Lussana found a direct relationship between the disease and a diet of corn deficient in albumin and nitrogen, such as that which grew in Bergamo. He fought the views that Pellagra was due to toxins or to infectious disease, stating: "Italy is a country eminently agricultural and will recover from pellagra when the government protects agriculture". In 1862 Lussana published a polemical article in the Italian Gazette addressed to Professor Paolo Mantegazza. Mantegazza had visited the people of Central and South America, finding no trace of pellagra, even with those whose diet was primarily of corn, and argued that therefore the exclusive food use of corn could not be the main and only cause of the disease. Lussana challenged this on the basis that the level of protein in the plant is modified by the climate and soil fertilization, with a comparative study shows that the corn of Vertova and Gandino also showed lower values than the French, reiterating that the lack of albumin in food was the cause of the pellagra endemic in some areas.

=== Other scientific works ===
In his booklet "Coffee" (1872) Lussana traces the history of this drink, analyzing the emergence and spread of places of production and statistical data on the main producing countries (Brazil, Puerto Rico, West Indies). He also includes a long list of citations and judgments about good and bad coffee, reporting objectively both negative and positive opinions. (Note: Il caffé) In 1874 Lussana and Pietro Albertoni published a lengthy article in Lo Sperimentale about the effects of alcohol and related substances on various animals, detailing extensive experiments they had conducted in Padua. Lussana was against the tax on salt. In a letter to Count Alessio Suardo in 1881 he underlined the necessity of sodium chloride in the tissues and blood, the need for its adequate presence in common food and its physiological and therapeutic uses, concluding in favor of a gradual elimination of the tax on salt.

In the paper "Human and comparative anatomy of cerebral convolutions" (Padua, 1886) Lussana, within the pseudo-sciences of physiognomy and phrenology, studies the anatomical correspondence in the brains of violent men, noting that the anatomy would vary with the inclinations and psychological attitudes of the subjects. In the informative 1888 volume Exercise and rest Lussana deals with the relationship between physical activity and intellectual laziness. Stressing the importance of labor, he speaks of physical education from Greece onward, highlighting the need for rest after the physical action.

=== Literary works ===
Lussana had great respect for the arts. He wrote

In the slow and tiring journey that humanity travels to arrive at the acquisition of truth, most often it is the intuitive genius of the fine arts that precedes science, which does not come until later, to explain and illuminate the inspiration of art.

In 1878 Lussana published A physiological lesson from Dante (1878 (Note: Una lezione fisiologica di Dante sulla generazione, con interpretazione e commenti di Filippo Lussana: Memoria letta alla r. Academia di scienze, lettere ed arti in Padova nella tornata del 20 maggio 1877)), the text of a lecture he had given at the Royal Academy of Sciences, Letters and Arts of Padua on 20 May 1877. Lussana defined Dante as the "great physiologist" based on Purgatory XXV, where the poet explains the Aristotelico-Thomistic views on generation. Lussana attributed to Dante the role of a precursor of Darwin's theory of evolution, saying that Dante anticipated a modern discovery by showing that during the life of the embryo even the more advanced animals first develop those organs that they have in common with the more primitive organisms.

Despite the large number of Lussana's scientific publications, he also found time to engage in a number of literary works, mostly written without much study, about the dispute between the classical and romantic times. In "Arduino", a poem of four verses in imitation of the Canton of Roland of Ludovico Ariosto, Lussana glorifies the Lombard hero Arduino of Ivrea, seen as a champion of revolt against Henry II, Holy Roman Emperor.

With the tragic drama Brasmina, Lussana follows the example of the songs of Ossian by James Macpherson. Thus, the poetic romance Filiberto, and the three songs Disease, Escape, Revenge. There followed is an anonymous poetic romance with patriotic inspiration published in 1865 in Parma. Adalbert of Ivrea is a historical novel in which Lussana takes the opportunity of a psychological study of an unrestrained and unconventional amorous passion. Finally there is Romanze, 12 short verses in which Lussana describes war and love, the sacred drama of homeland and history, family, betrayal and discord among Italians. In 1866 he released an anonymous poem dedicated to the Italian War of 1860.

== Memorials ==
In Bergamo, a street has been named after him since 1923, and the "Filippo Lussana" high school is also named after him In Cenate Sopra a plaque commemorates his birthplace. His house in Gandino is also commemorated with a plaque.

== Selected bibliography ==
A sample of independently published papers and books from Lussano's huge output, which also included many papers published in learned journals, is given below:

- Lussana, Filippo (1851). Cenni pratici sulle acque di S. Pellegrino. Chiusi. p. 56.
- Lussana, Filippo (1856). Alcune osservazioni fisio-patologiche su'l sistema nervoso. Chiusi. p. 153.
- Lussana, Filippo; Frua, Carlo (1856). Su la pellagra, memoria dei dottori Filippo Lussana e Carlo Frua. coi tipi di G. Bernardoni. p. 352.
- Lussana, Filippo; Lussana, Pietro (1856). Su'l coléra morbus in Gandino nel 1855. Typ. di Giuseppe Chiusi. pp. 67.
- Lussana, Filippo (1859a). Sulla pellagra-Studj pratici.
- Lussana, Filippo (1859b). Fisiologia del dolore: osservazioni e ricerche. Chiusi. p. 304.
- Lussana, Filippo (1859c). Monografia delle nevralgie bracchiali: Con appendice intorno alla angine pectoris. Chiusi. p. 316.
- Lussana, Filippo (1863). Sugli si medico-chirurgici dello acetato di ferro saggio. Chiusi. p. 93.
- Lussana, Filippo (1866). Compendio anatomico delle Circonvoluzioni cerebrali.
- Lussana, Filippo (1867). Ricerche fisio-patologiche sulla fibrina del sangue. p. 56.
- Lussana, Filippo (1868). Manuale pratico di fisiologia: ad uso dei medici. Salmin. p. 304.
- Lussana, Filippo (1870). Fisiologia degli istinti. Sacchetto. p. 106.
- Lussana, Filippo; Lemoigne, Alessio (1871). Fisiologia dei centri nervosi encefalici. Prosperini.
- Lussana, Filippo (1871). Sulla fermentazione amigdalica, o, Cianogena dentro e fuori dell' organismo animale. P. Prosperini. p. 26.
- Lussana, Filippo (1872a). Il caffé. p. 99.
- Lussana, Filippo (1872b). Sulle cause della pellagra: ricerche. R. Stab. di P. Prosperini. p. 24.
- Lussana, Filippo (1873). Fisiologia dei colori. Sacchetto. p. 140.
- Lussana, Filippo (1877). Una lezione fisiologica di Dante sulla generazione, con interpretazione e commenti di Filippo Lussana: Memoria letta alla r. Academia di scienze, lettere ed arti in Padova nella tornata del 20 maggio 1877. B. Randi. p. 43.
- Lussana, Filippo; Albertoni, Pietro; Lussana, Felice (1877). Sulla velenosità degli estratti cadaverici: ricerche medico-legali dei dottori Pietro Albertoni, Felice e Filippo Lussana. Tip. Cattaneo. p. 30.
- Lussana, Filippo (1879). Delle funzioni dei lobi anteriori del cervello umano: tenuto particolare conto delle opinioni dei moderni sull'origine e sulla sede della parola; memoria. Rechiedei. p. 183.
- Lussana, Filippo; Ciotto, Francesco (1884). Sugli alcaloidi del mais guasto: ricerche chimiche e fisiologiche. Rechiedei. p. 123.
- Lussana, Filippo (1885). Fisiologia e patologia del cervelletto. Drucker & Tedeschi. p. 238.
- Lussana, Filippo (1887). Bozzetti medici. Bellisario. p. 253.

== Notes and references ==
Notes

Citations

Sources

- Aresi, Paolo (7 October 2007). "Filippo Lussana (1820-1897) tra pratica medica e ricerca scientifica". Archivo Bergamasco. Archived from the original on 16 May 2010.
- Berti, Giuseppina Bock (2007). "LUSSANA, Filippo". Dizionario Biografico degli Italiani. Vol. 66. Treccani.
- Bloch, Konrad (1997-03-01). Blondes in Venetian Paintings, the Nine-Banded Armadillo, and Other Essays in Biochemistry. Yale University Press. ISBN 978-0-300-07055-2.
- Henry, A. (1875). "Lussana and Albertoni on the action of alcohol, aldehyde, and the vinic ethers". London Medical Record. Smith, Elder.
- Imparato, Maria (7 October 2011). "150 anni di scienza in Italia: la figura di Filippo Lussana". Associazione BergamoScienza. Archived from the original on 4 March 2016.
- Lorusso, L; Bravi, GO; Buzzetti, S; Porro, A (2012). "Filippo Lussana (1820-1897): from medical practitioner to neuroscience". Neurol. Sci. 33 (3): 703–8. doi:10.1007/s10072-011-0796-9. PMID 21948119. S2CID 26126440.
- Masini, Sergio (29 September 2012). "DONIZETTI e LUSSANA: due bergamaschi nel mondo" (PDF). l’Associazione Scuola di Grafologia Crotti.
- Mosso, Angelo (1896). Fear. E. Lough and F. Kiesow (trans.). New York, London and Bombay: Longmans, Green and co.
- Rose, Frank Clifford (2010-08-30). Neurology of Music. World Scientific. ISBN 978-1-84816-268-6.
- Warman, Arturo (2003). Corn & Capitalism: How A Botanical Bastard Grew To Global Dominance. Univ of North Carolina Press. p. 135. ISBN 978-0-8078-5437-2.

Further reading

- In ricordo di Filippo Lussana, Bergamo, Savoldi 1924
- Rivista di Bergamo, Maggio 1925
- Carlo Traini, Filippo Lussana, Trescore Balneario, San Marco 1960
- Ezio Pellegrini, Sergio Stefanini, Filippo Lussana senior. La vita e le opere, Trescore Balneario (Bg), San Marco 1999
