= Scanzorosciate =

- Comune
- Comune di Scanzorosciate
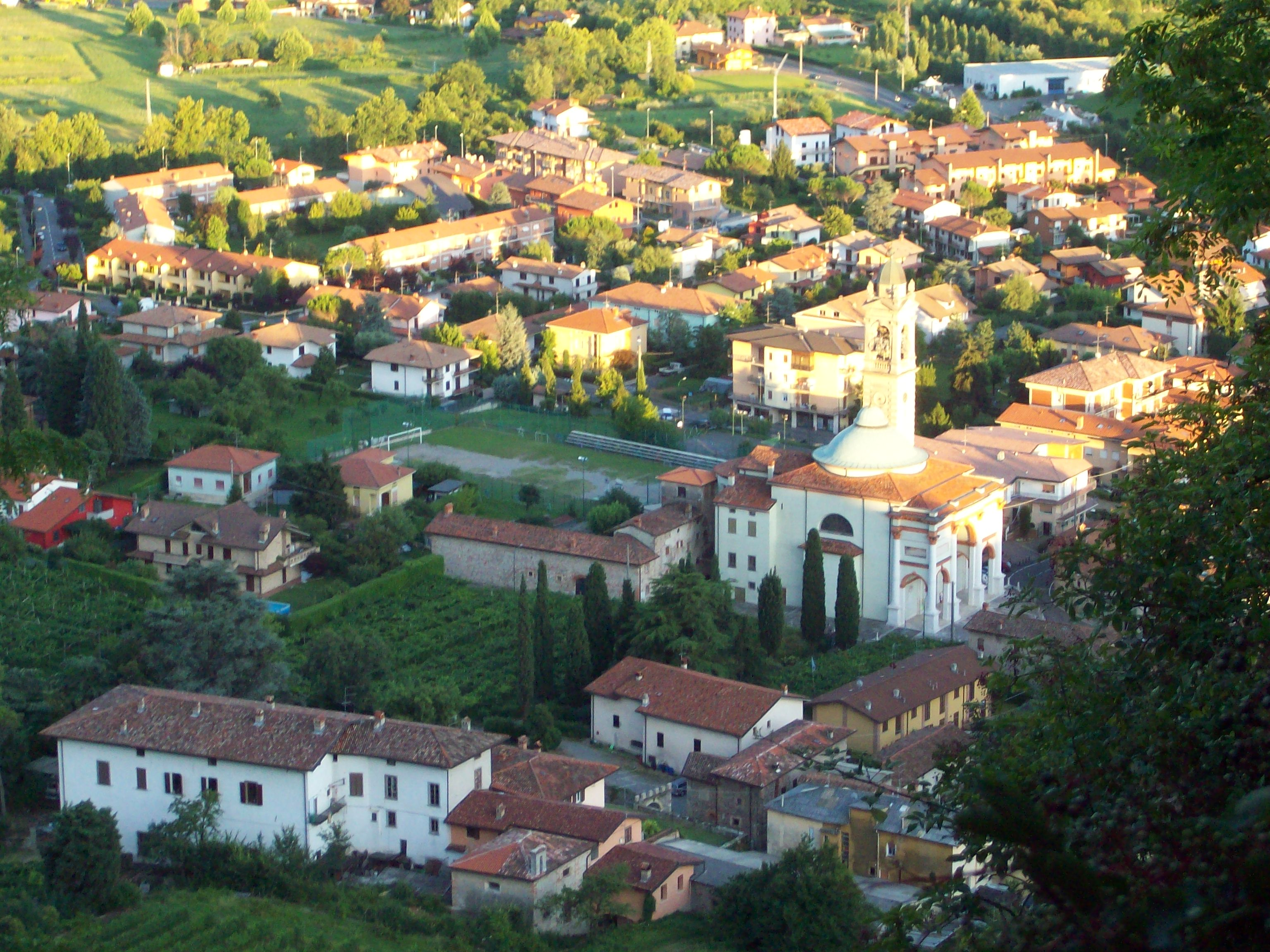
- Rosciate

- Coat of arms

- Location within Italy Location within Lombardy
- Coordinates: 45°42′41″N 9°44′09″E
- Country: Italy
- Region: Lombardy
- Province: Province of Bergamo (BG)
- Frazioni: Scanzo, Rosciate, Negrone, Tribulina, Gavarno

Government
  - Mayor: Davide Casati

Area
  - Total: 10.69 km^{2} (4.13 sq mi)
- Elevation: 297 m (974 ft)

Population (31 May 2021)
  - Total: 9,808
  - Density: 917.5/km^{2} (2,376/sq mi)
- Demonym: Scanzorosciatesi
- Time zone: UTC+1 (CET)
  - Summer (DST): UTC+2 (CEST)
- Postal code: 24020
- Dialing code: 035
- Patron saint: St. Roch
- Saint day: August 16
- Website: www.comune.scanzorosciate.bg.it

Scanzorosciate (Bergamasque: Scans) is a comune (municipality) in the Province of Bergamo in the Italian region of Lombardy, located about 50 kilometres (31 mi) northeast of Milan and about 6 kilometres (4 mi) northeast of Bergamo. As of 30 April 2013, it had a population of 10,018 and an area of 10.8 square kilometres (4.2 mi^{2}).

Scanzorosciate borders the following municipalities: Cenate Sopra, Cenate Sotto, Gorle, Nembro, Pedrengo, Pradalunga, Ranica, San Paolo d'Argon, Torre de' Roveri, Villa di Serio.
