= Maresana Hill =

Coordinates: 45°43′43″N 9°40′05″E

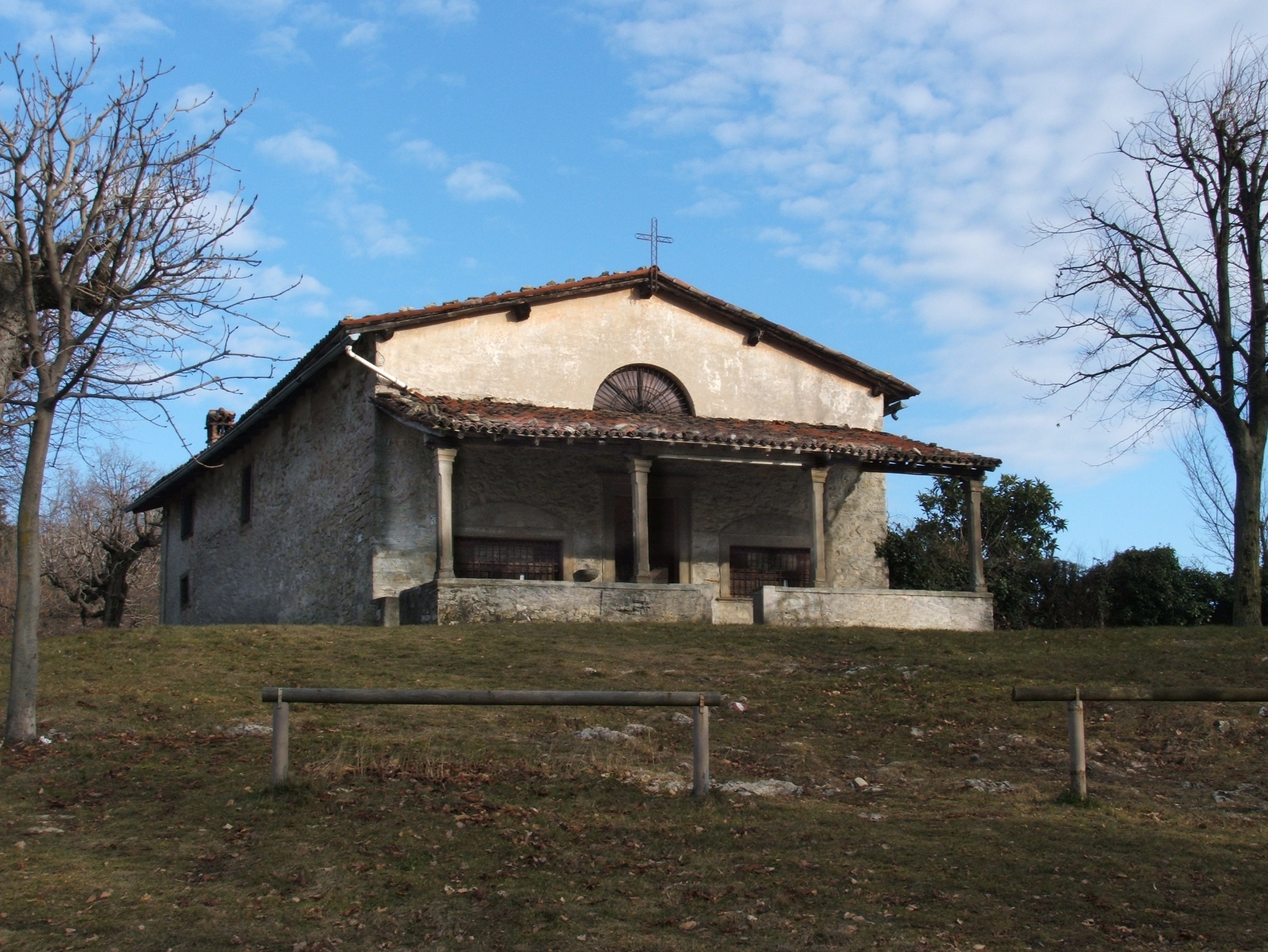
Saint Mark's church on Maresana Hill

Maresana is a hill north of the city of Bergamo, in Lombardy, Italy. Its maximum elevation is 546 metres above sea level.

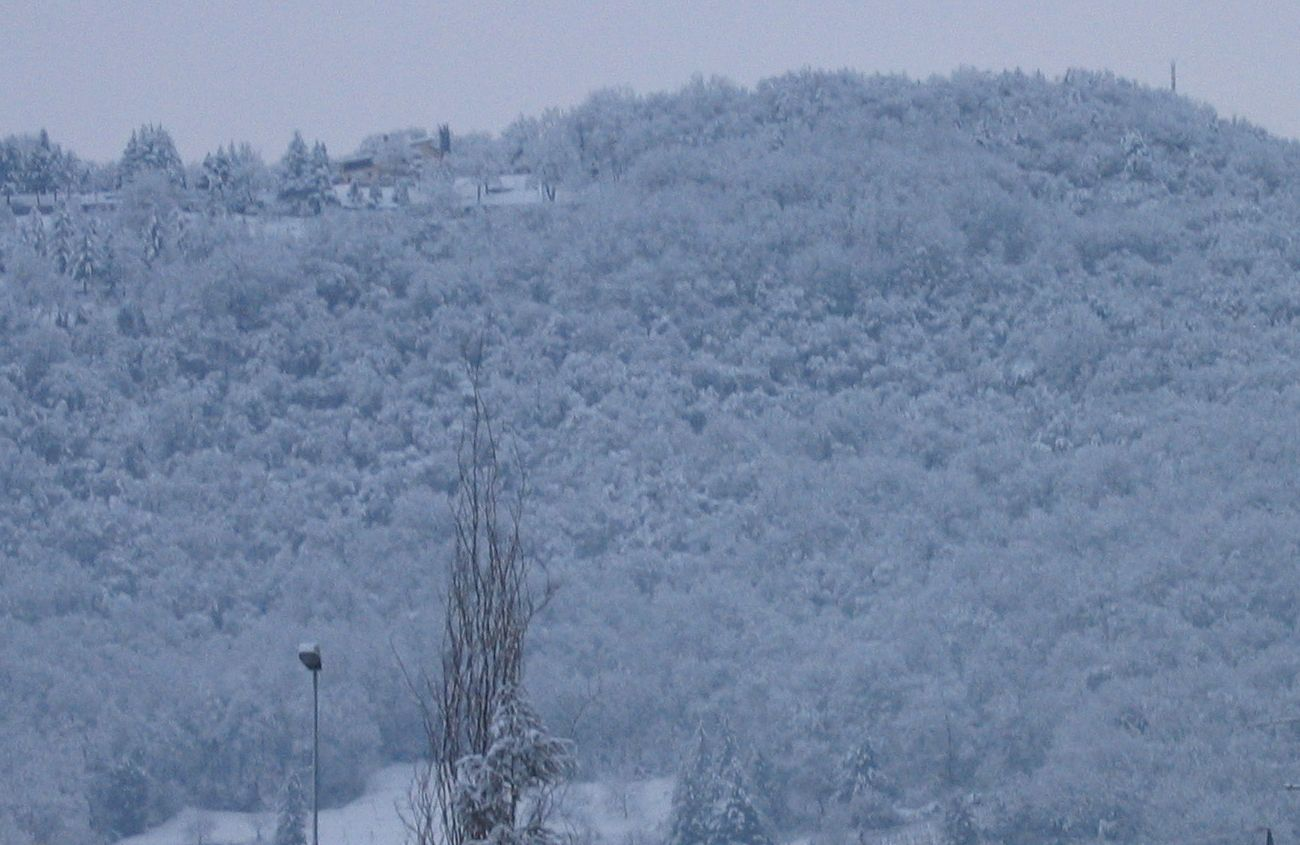
Maresana viewed from Valtesse after snow during the winter season

Maresana belongs to the cities and villages of Bergamo, Ponteranica, Torre Boldone, and Ranica. Its modern name was mentioned for the first time in the thirteenth century; it had previously been called Monte Torsillio.

In the past, the hill was planted with chestnut trees whose nuts local farmers sold in the Bergamo market. Today the woods are in good condition because of the preservation work of the staff of the Parco Regionale dei colli di Bergamo (Bergamo Hills Regional Park).

The Church of San Marco alla Maresana (St Mark's on Maresana) was built on the hill in 1619. Since the 1950s, some houses for wealthy Bergamaschi have also been built on Maresana.
