= Pradalunga =

- Comune
- Comune di Pradalunga
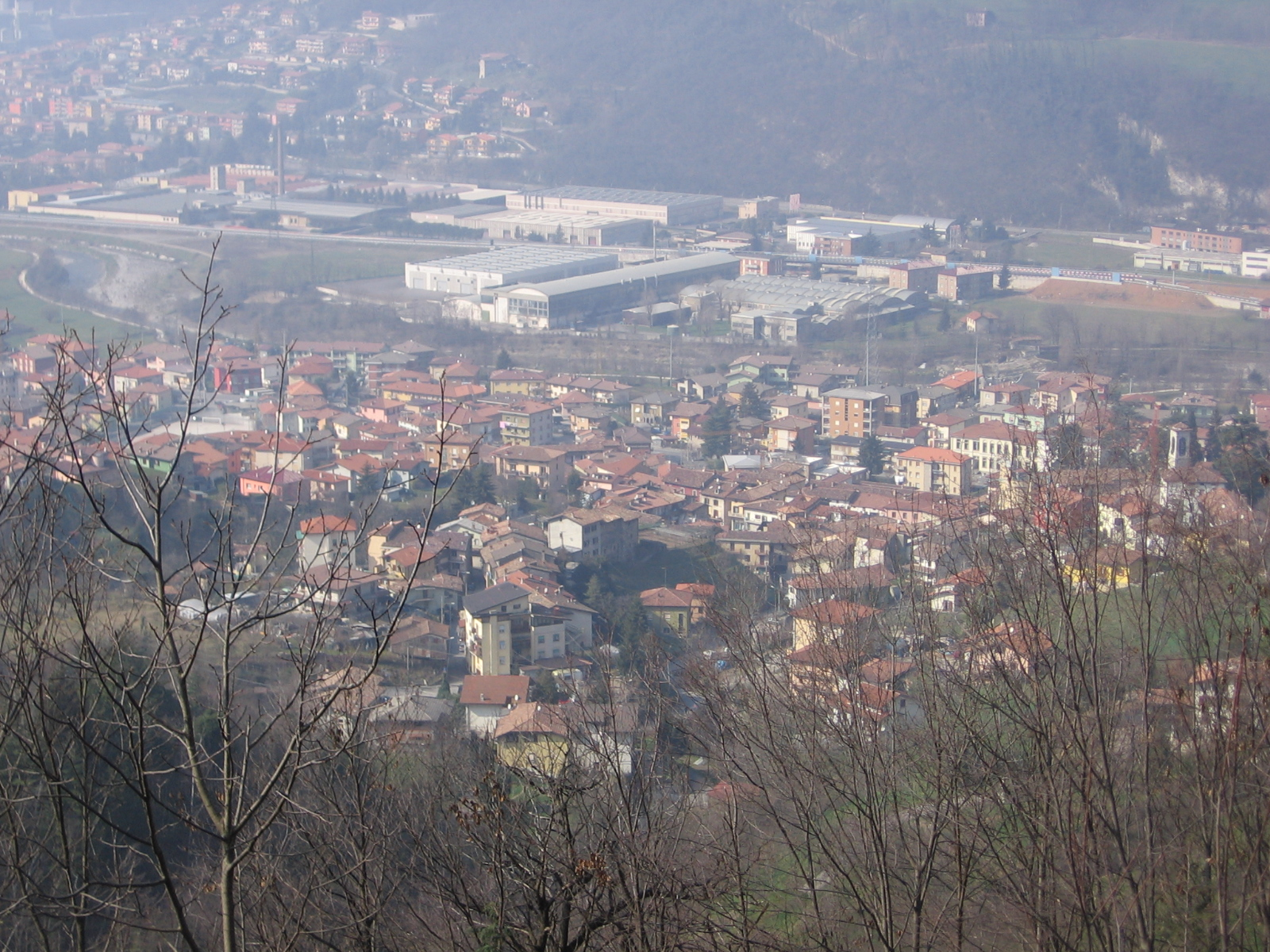
- A view over the town of Pradalunga

- Location within Italy Location within Lombardy
- Coordinates: 45°44′48″N 9°46′59″E
- Country: Italy
- Region: Lombardy
- Province: Province of Bergamo (BG)
- Frazioni: Cornale

Area
  - Total: 8.39 km^{2} (3.24 sq mi)
- Elevation: 327 m (1,073 ft)

Population (28 February 2026)
  - Total: 4,504
  - Density: 537/km^{2} (1,390/sq mi)
- Demonym: Pradalunghesi
- Time zone: UTC+1 (CET)
  - Summer (DST): UTC+2 (CEST)
- Postal code: 24020
- Dialing code: 035
- ISTAT code: 016173
- Patron saint: Saint Barbara
- Saint day: December 4
- Website: Official website

Pradalunga (Bergamasque: Prédalónga) is a comune (municipality) in the Province of Bergamo in the Italian region of Lombardy, located about 60 kilometres (37 mi) northeast of Milan and about 11 kilometres (7 mi) northeast of Bergamo. As of 31 December 2006, it had a population of 4,460 and an area of 8.39 square kilometres (3.24 mi^{2}).

The municipality of Pradalunga contains the frazione (subdivision) Cornale.

Pradalunga borders the following municipalities: Albino, Cenate Sopra, Nembro, Scanzorosciate.

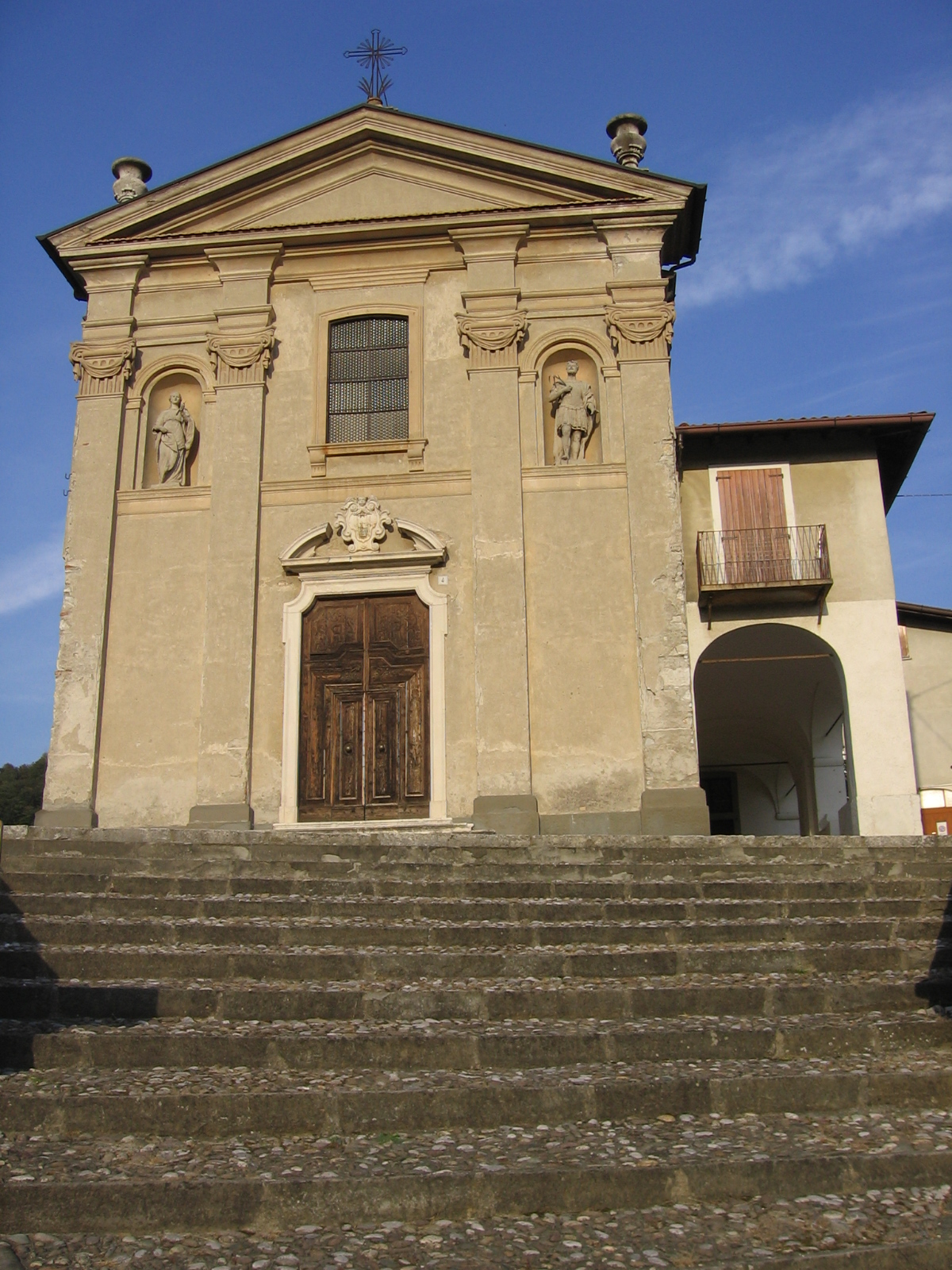
the old church

Pradalunga has many hills and mountains: the most important mountain in Pradalunga is “Mount Misma“. The Serio River crosses Pradalunga, so Pradalunga is in the Seriana Valley. On Mount Misma there is a sanctuary. Its name is “Forcella” and it is dedicated to the Virgin Mary. It was built by miners. Next to the sanctuary there is a restaurant.

The patron saints of Pradalunga and Cornale are Saint Lucy, Saint Christopher, Saint Vincent and Saint Barbara. Saint Lucy brings presents to the children in the night of every 13 December. Pradalunga and Cornale's people pray a lot for them. There are three churches dedicated to the patron saints; some local streets are named for them. Saint Barbara is the patron of every miner. Miners are very important for the economy of Pradalunga because in this village there are the quarries of the “Coti” stones; from these quarries miners used to extract the “Coti” stones. These stones are typical of Pradalunga and they are used to sharpen knives, scissors and so on. They are exported to many foreign countries.
