= Lussana =

Lussana is an Italian surname. Notable people with the surname include:

- Constantino Lussana (1892–1944), Italian long-distance runner
- Filippo Lussana (1820–1897), Italian physiologist
