= Torre de' Roveri =

Tower of Durmasts
- Comune
- Comune di Torre de' Roveri
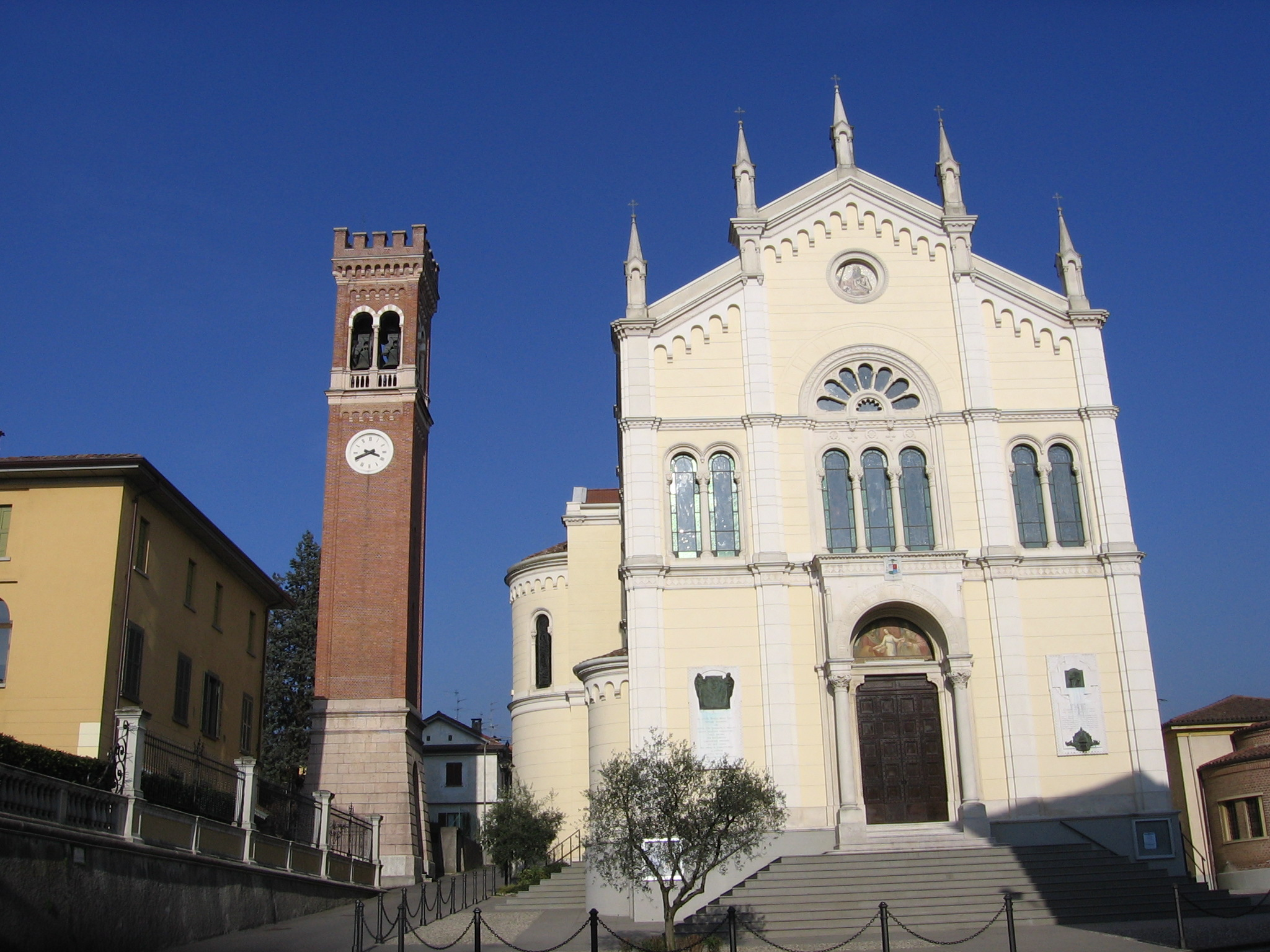
- Church

- Location within Italy Location within Lombardy
- Coordinates: 45°42′N 9°47′E
- Country: Italy
- Region: Lombardy
- Province: Bergamo (BG)

Government
  - Mayor: Matteo Francesco Lebbolo

Area
  - Total: 2.69 km^{2} (1.04 sq mi)
- Elevation: 271 m (889 ft)

Population (31 May 2021)
  - Total: 2,498
  - Density: 929/km^{2} (2,410/sq mi)
- Demonym: Torresi
- Time zone: UTC+1 (CET)
  - Summer (DST): UTC+2 (CEST)
- Postal code: 24060
- Dialing code: 035
- Website: Official website

Torre de' Roveri (Bergamasque: Tór de Róer) is a comune (municipality) in the Province of Bergamo in the Italian region of Lombardy, located about 50 kilometres (31 mi) northeast of Milan and about 9 kilometres (6 mi) east of Bergamo.

Torre de' Roveri borders the following municipalities: Albano Sant'Alessandro, Pedrengo, San Paolo d'Argon, Scanzorosciate.
