= Pedrengo =

- Comune
- Comune di Pedrengo
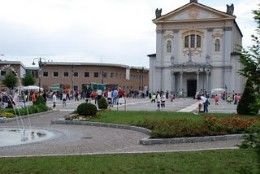
- Oratorio Pedrengo

- Location within Italy Location within Lombardy
- Coordinates: 45°42′N 9°44′E
- Country: Italy
- Region: Lombardy
- Province: Province of Bergamo (BG)

Area
  - Total: 3.6 km^{2} (1.4 sq mi)
- Elevation: 262 m (860 ft)

Population (Dec. 2004)
  - Total: 5,321
  - Density: 1,500/km^{2} (3,800/sq mi)
- Demonym: Pedrenghesi
- Time zone: UTC+1 (CET)
  - Summer (DST): UTC+2 (CEST)
- Postal code: 24066
- Dialing code: 035
- Patron saint: Saint Evasio

Pedrengo (Bergamasque: Pedrèngh) is a comune (municipality) in the Province of Bergamo in the Italian region of Lombardy, located about 50 kilometres (31 mi) northeast of Milan and about 5 kilometres (3 mi) east of Bergamo. As of 31 December 2004, it had a population of 5,321 and an area of 3.6 square kilometres (1.4 mi^{2}).

Pedrengo borders the following municipalities: Albano Sant'Alessandro, Gorle, Scanzorosciate, Seriate, Torre de' Roveri.

Pedrengo is famous for the villas that have remained to this day, thanks to noble and wealthy families that in the past centuries have come to the city. This is thanks to the lush green of parks and gardens, as well as large spaces that characterized the city. These villas were the ideal place to spend the summer months and also served as country residences. These are "Villa Sottocasa", "Villa Berizzi" "Villa Frizzoni" and "Palazzo Donadoni".

== Demographic evolution ==
Historical population

Year	Pop.	±%
1861	587	—
1871	671	+14.3%
1881	708	+5.5%
1901	859	+21.3%
1911	1,008	+17.3%

Year	Pop.	±%
1921	1,044	+3.6%
1931	1,113	+6.6%
1936	1,259	+13.1%
1951	1,585	+25.9%
1961	1,742	+9.9%

Year	Pop.	±%
1971	2,594	+48.9%
1981	3,299	+27.2%
1991	4,283	+29.8%
2001	5,166	+20.6%

Source: Data from ISTAT
