= Valtesse =

Neighborhood in the Italian city of Bergamo

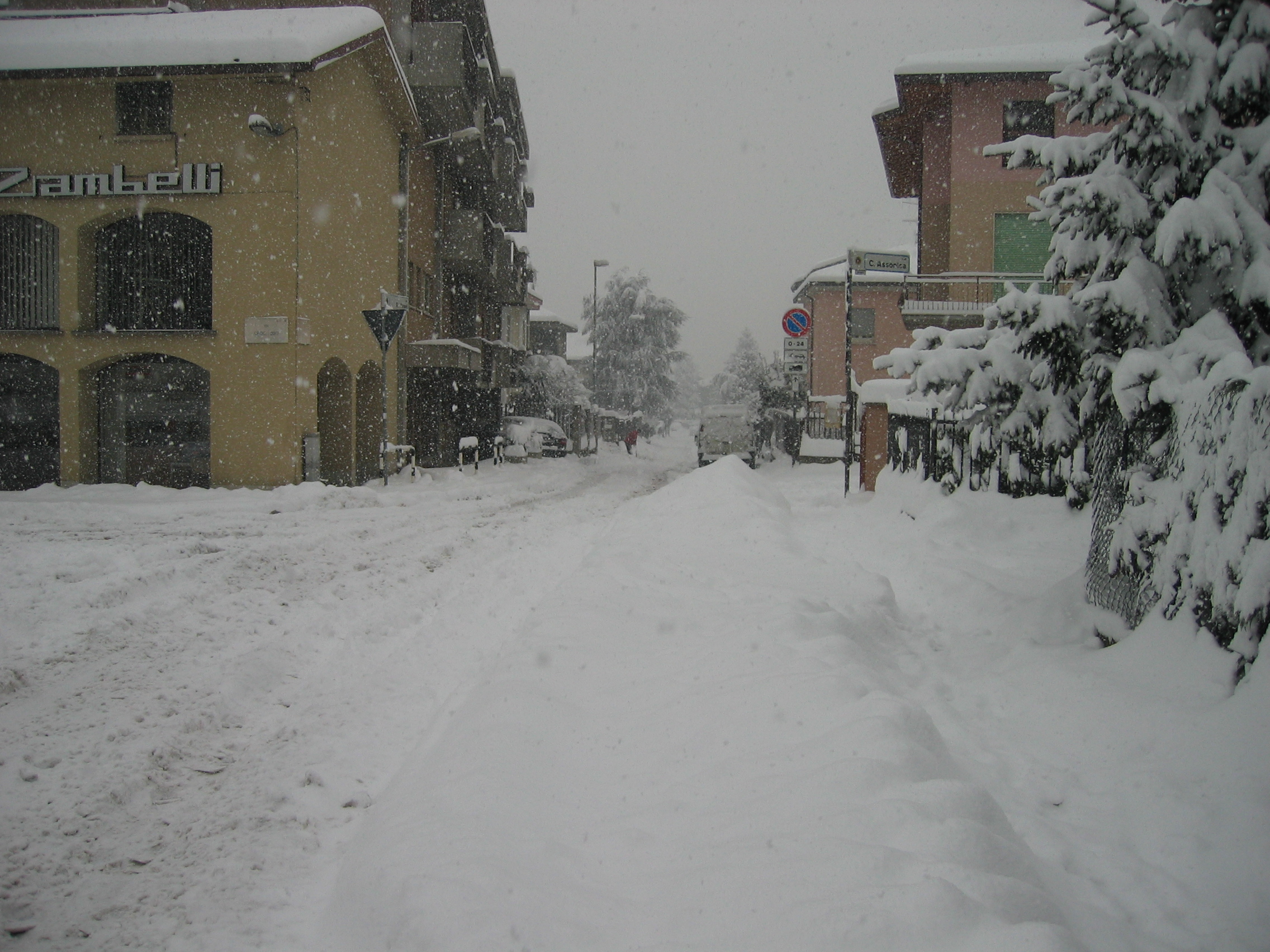
A view of a street of Valtesse under the snow

Valtesse, located at 45°42′57″N 9°40′05″E, is a quarter of the city of Bergamo in the north part of the city between the hill of Città Alta and Maresana Hill. The population is approximately 10,000.

Valtesse was a part of the fourth circoscrizione (administrative unit of the city), and is divided into two Roman Catholic parishes: Sant'Antonio da Padova and San Colombano. Valtesse borders with the borough of Valverde, Bergamo, Conca Fiorita, Monterosso and the municipality of Ponteranica.

Composer Gaetano Donizetti was buried in the cemetery of Valtesse in 1848, before his body was transferred to Bergamo's Basilica of Santa Maria Maggiore in 1875.
