= Pietro Albertoni =

Italian physiologist and politician (1849–1933)

- Born: 22 September 1849; Gazoldo degli Ippoliti, Mantua
- Died: 8 November 1933 (aged 84); Bologna
- Occupations: Physiologist, Politician
- Known for: Senator of Italy

Pietro Albertoni (22 September 1849 – 8 November 1933 ) was an Italian physiologist and politician who was appointed Senator of the Kingdom in 1912.

== Biography ==
Pietro Albertoni was born in Gazoldo degli Ippoliti, Mantua on 22 September 1849. His father Giovanni was a surgeon. In 1866, when only sixteen years of age, he enlisted in the ranks of Garibaldi's partisans and participated in the battle of Bezzecca. In 1873 he graduated in medicine at the University of Padua. After graduation, he entered the Institute of Physiology directed by Filippo Lussana. In Padua, he completed studies on different aspects of the physiology of the digestive and nervous systems, and the physiology of development. He worked on forensic medicine related to poisonings.

In 1876 Albertoni became professor of physiology at the University of Siena, then in 1878 professor of materia medica at the University of Genoa. He remained in Genoa until 1884 when he obtained the professorship of materia medica at the University of Bologna. In Bologna he collaborated extensively with Icilio Guareschi, with whom he founded the Review of medicinal chemistry and pharmacy, which soon became very influential. In 1887 he assumed the chair of Physiology, vacated by the death of Luigi Vella. This was the beginning of a forty-year period of important research, especially on the physiology of the nervous system.

Albertoni was elected a deputy to the legislature of the kingdom for three terms of office (1892-1895, 1897-1900 and 1900-1904) representing Bozzolo for the Italian Radical Party. On 17 March 1912 he was named Senator of the Kingdom.

Albertoni was admitted to numerous Italian and foreign academies, including the Accademia dei Lincei. He died in Bologna on 8 November 1933.

== Honors ==
- Knight of the Order of Saint Maurice and Lazarus
- Knight of the Order of the Crown of Italy

The road that runs parallel to one of the sides of the Hospital S. Orsola in Bologna, dividing it from the Malpighi Hospital, is named after him.

== Sources ==
- Vincenzo Cappelletti, «ALBERTONI, Pietro». In: Dizionario Biografico degli Italiani, Roma: Istituto dell'Enciclopedia Italiana, Vol. I, 1960
- Giuseppe Borgatti, «Prof. Pietro Albertoni». Estratto da Rivista di Biologia, Vol. XXI, Fascicolo II, 1936-XV (pdf)
