= Ponteranica =

Ponteranica Potranga / Put de Ranga (Lombard)
- Comune
- Comune di Ponteranica
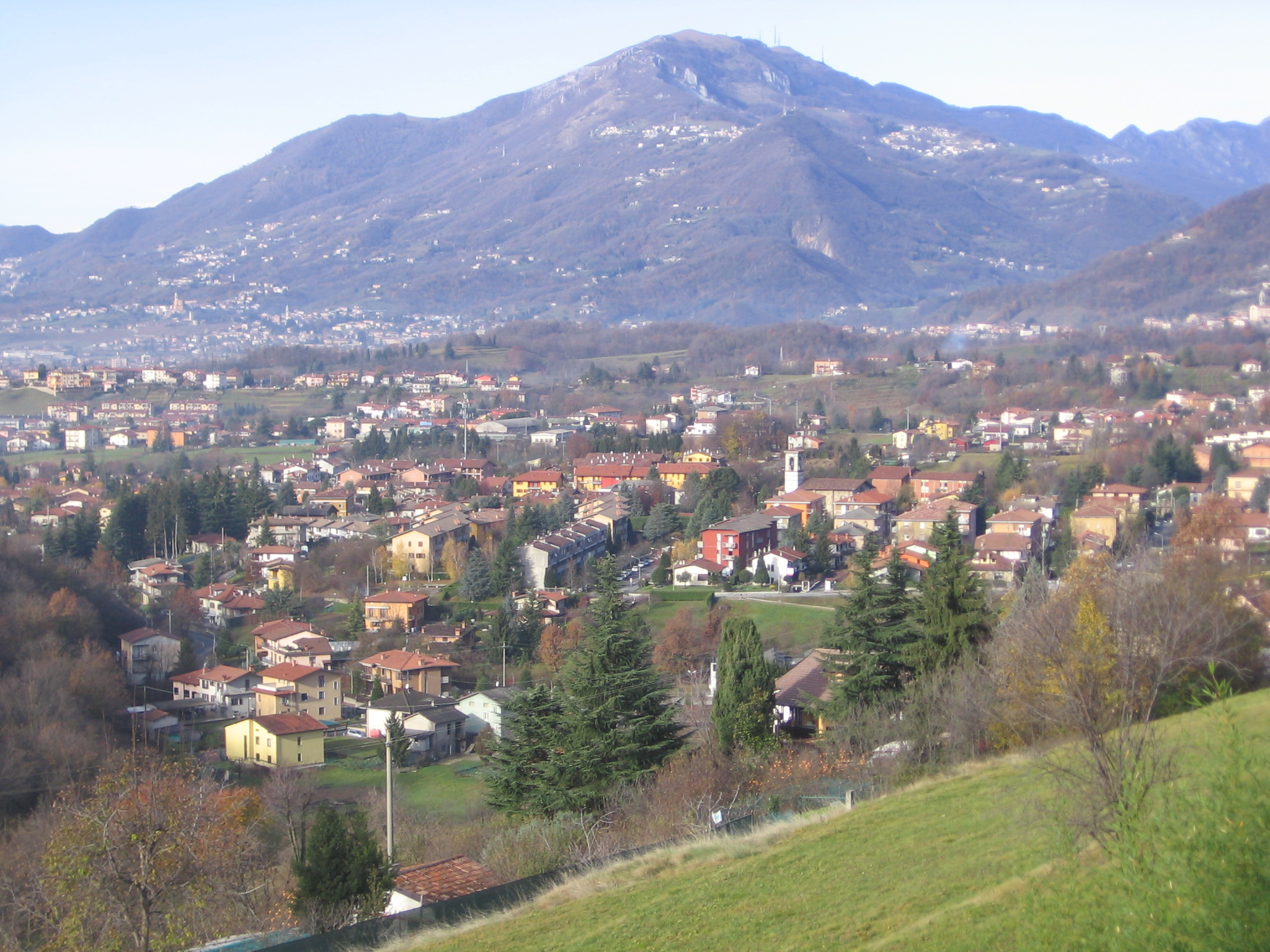
- Ponteranica

- Location within Italy Location within Lombardy
- Coordinates: 45°44′N 9°39′E
- Country: Italy
- Region: Lombardy
- Province: Province of Bergamo (BG)

Area
  - Total: 8.4 km^{2} (3.2 sq mi)
- Elevation: 545 m (1,788 ft)

Population (Dec. 2004)
  - Total: 6,866
  - Density: 820/km^{2} (2,100/sq mi)
- Demonym: Ponteranichesi
- Time zone: UTC+1 (CET)
  - Summer (DST): UTC+2 (CEST)
- Postal code: 24010
- Dialing code: 035
- Website: Official website

Ponteranica (Italian: [ponteˈraːnika]; Bergamasque: Potranga or Put de Ranga; lit. 'Bridge to Ranica') is a comune (municipality) in the Province of Bergamo in the Italian region of Lombardy, located about 50 kilometres (31 mi) northeast of Milan and about 4 kilometres (2 mi) northwest of Bergamo. As of 31 December 2004, it had a population of 6,866 and an area of 8.4 square kilometres (3.2 mi^{2}).

The source of the river Morla is located in Ponteranica. A part of its surface is occupied by Maresana Hill and some of its territory belongs to Parco dei Colli di Bergamo.

Ponteranica borders the following municipalities: Alzano Lombardo, Bergamo, Ranica, Sorisole, Torre Boldone, Zogno.

== Demographic evolution ==
Historical population

Year	Pop.	±%
1861	1,007	—
1871	1,104	+9.6%
1881	1,198	+8.5%
1901	1,367	+14.1%
1911	1,850	+35.3%

Year	Pop.	±%
1921	2,001	+8.2%
1931	2,366	+18.2%
1936	2,467	+4.3%
1951	2,962	+20.1%
1961	4,172	+40.9%

Year	Pop.	±%
1971	5,443	+30.5%
1981	6,675	+22.6%
1991	7,084	+6.1%
2001	6,878	−2.9%

Source: Data from ISTAT
