= Ranica =

- Comune
- Comune di Ranica
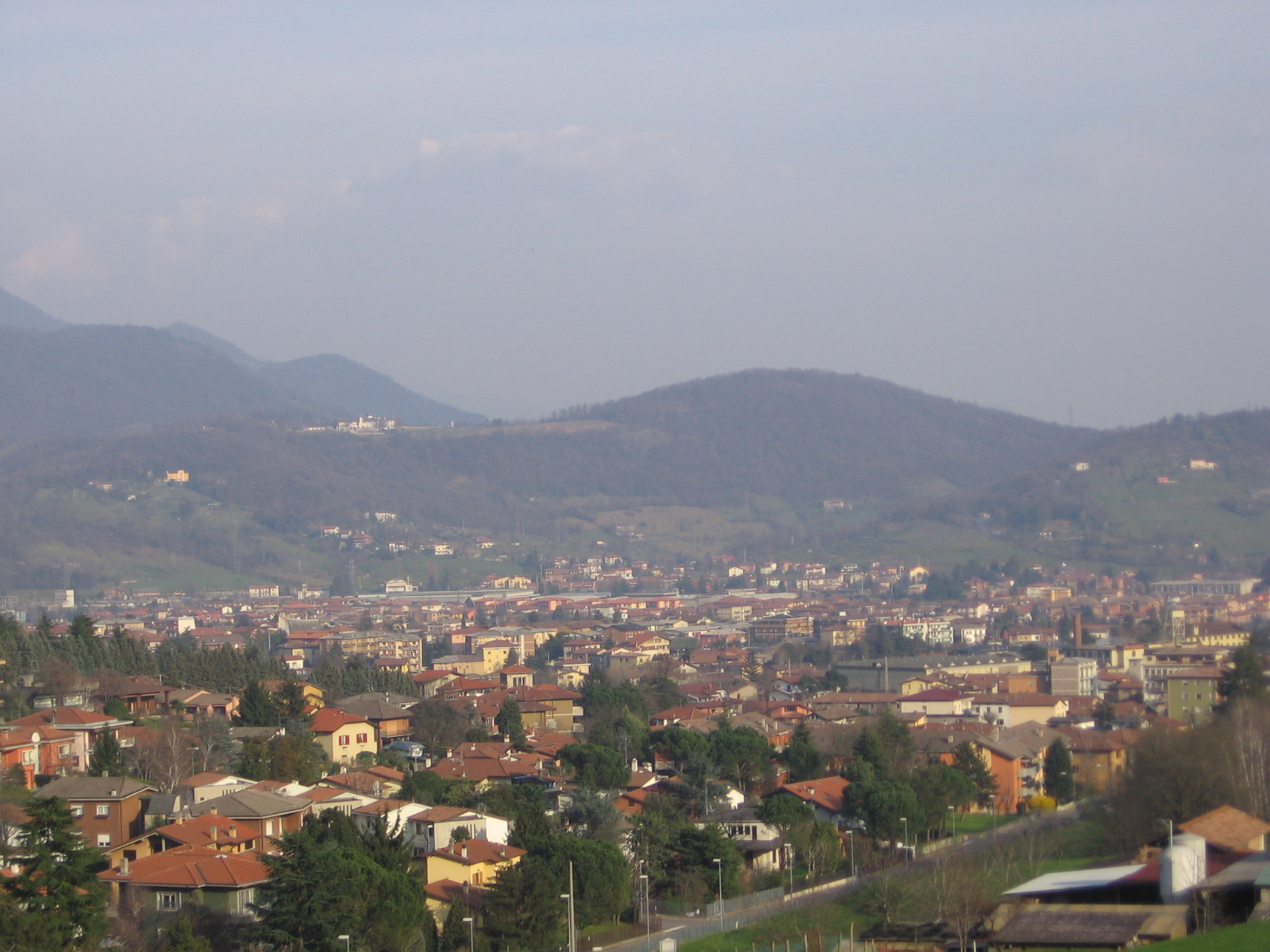
- Ranica

- Coat of arms

- Location within Italy Location within Lombardy
- Coordinates: 45°44′N 9°43′E
- Country: Italy
- Region: Lombardy
- Province: Province of Bergamo (BG)

Area
  - Total: 4.2 km^{2} (1.6 sq mi)
- Elevation: 293 m (961 ft)

Population (Dec. 2004)
  - Total: 5,984
  - Density: 1,400/km^{2} (3,700/sq mi)
- Demonym: Ranichesi
- Time zone: UTC+1 (CET)
  - Summer (DST): UTC+2 (CEST)
- Postal code: 24020
- Dialing code: 035
- Website: Official website

Ranica (Bergamasque: Ranga or La Rànga or Laranga or Ràniga; Medieval Latin: Larianica) is a comune (municipality) in the Province of Bergamo in the Italian region of Lombardy, located about 50 kilometres (31 mi) northeast of Milan and about 5 kilometres (3 mi) northeast of Bergamo. As of 31 December 2004, it had a population of 5,984 and an area of 4.2 square kilometres (1.6 mi^{2}).

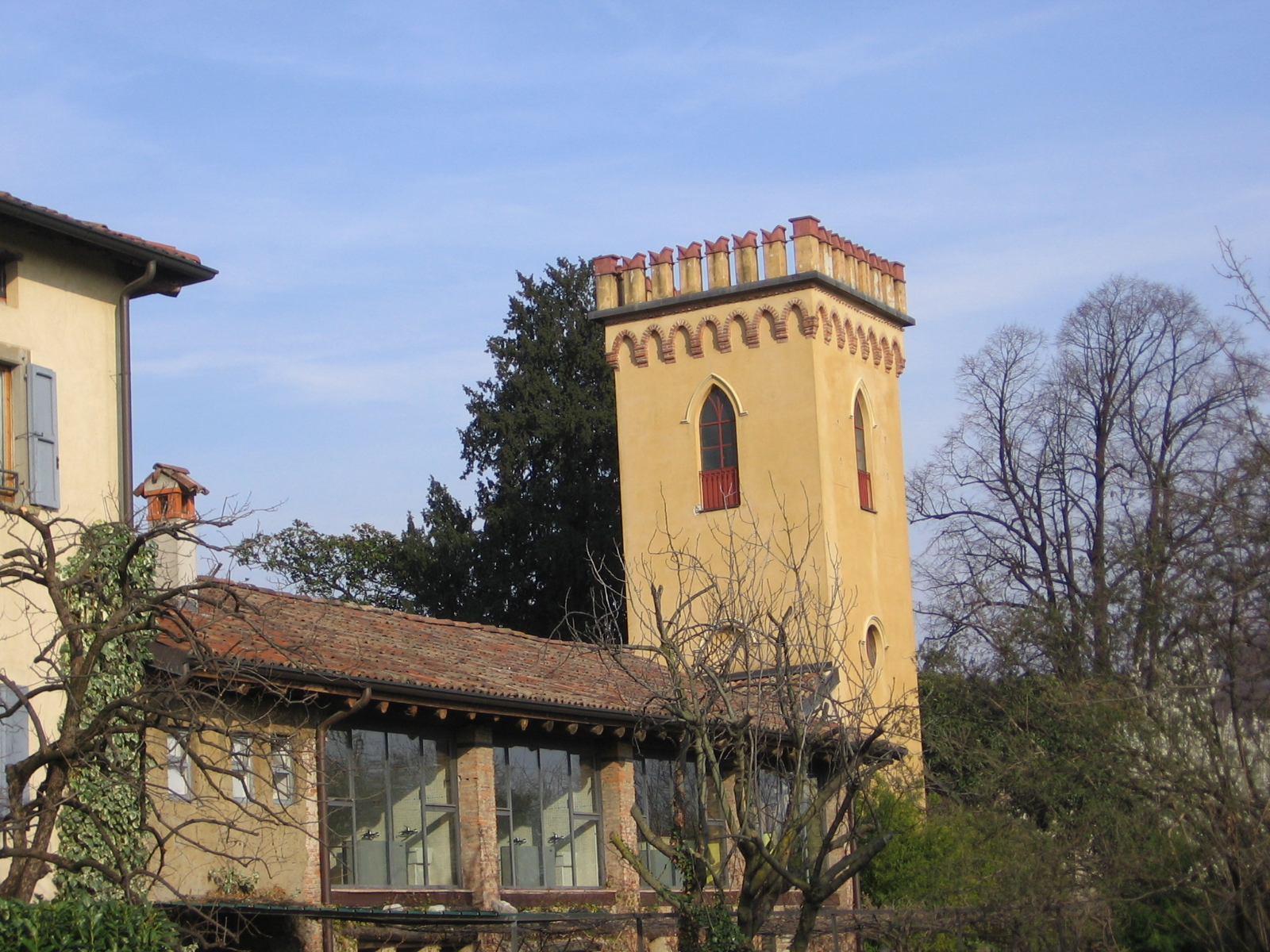
the tower of Viandasso

Ranica borders the following municipalities: Alzano Lombardo, Gorle, Ponteranica, Scanzorosciate, Torre Boldone, Villa di Serio. Part of Ranica's territory is part of Parco dei Colli di Bergamo.

The town contains the Church of the Santissimi Sette Fratelli Martiri.

== Demographic evolution ==
Historical population

Year	Pop.	±%
1861	920	—
1871	998	+8.5%
1881	1,243	+24.5%
1901	1,573	+26.5%
1911	2,022	+28.5%

Year	Pop.	±%
1921	2,170	+7.3%
1931	2,445	+12.7%
1936	2,516	+2.9%
1951	2,982	+18.5%
1961	3,259	+9.3%

Year	Pop.	±%
1971	4,018	+23.3%
1981	5,262	+31.0%
1991	5,723	+8.8%
2001	5,820	+1.7%

Source: Data from ISTAT
