= Santissimi Sette Fratelli Martiri, Ranica =

Church building in Ranica, Italy

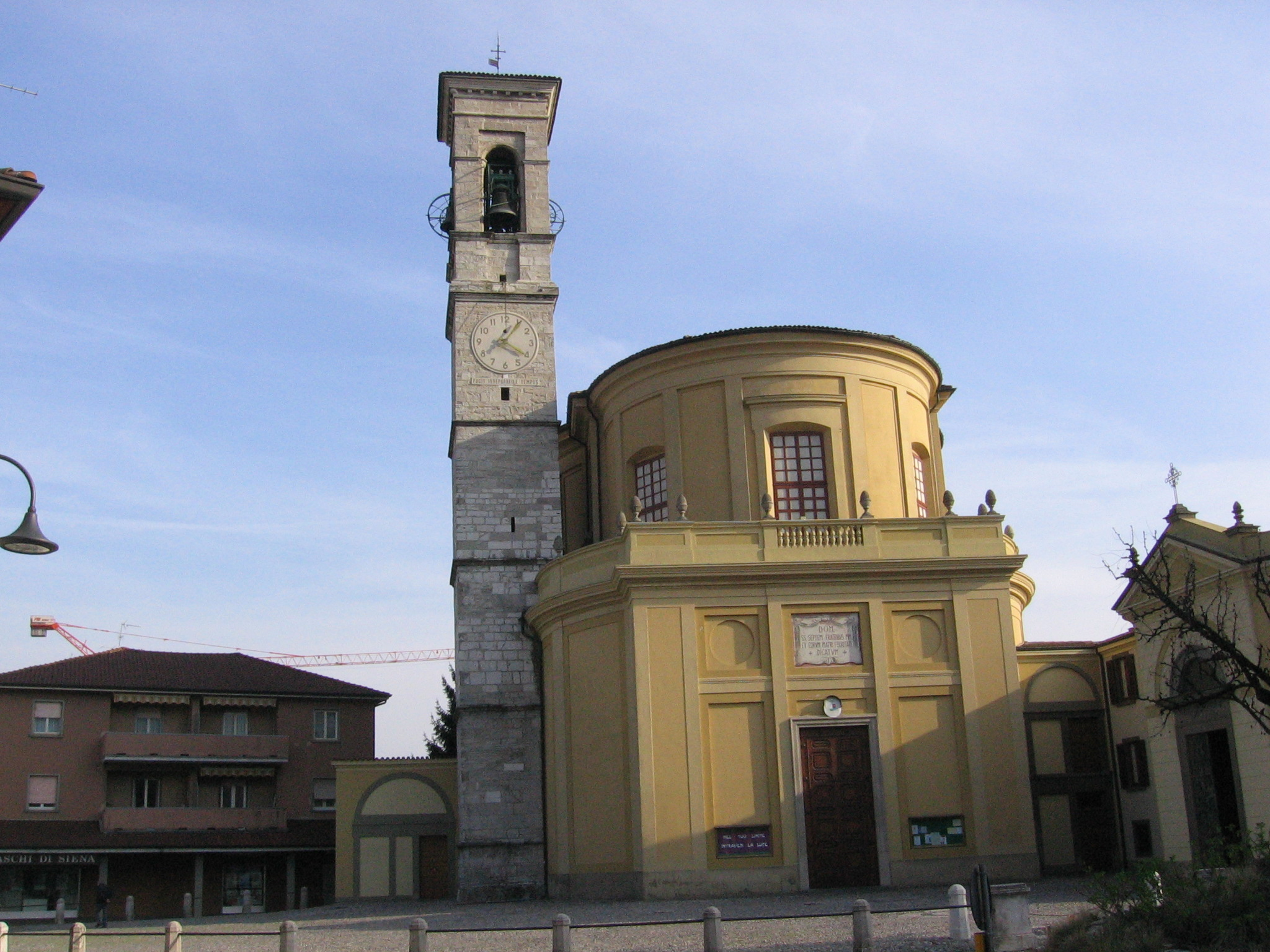
Ranica parrocchia.jpg

The church of the Santissimi Sette Fratelli Martiri (Church of the Holy Seven Martyred Brothers) is a Roman Catholic church in Ranica, province of Bergamo, in Lombardy, Italy. Alongside rises also the church of Santa Lucia.

== History ==
The church is dedicated to the Holy Maccabean Martyrs, mentioned in 2 Maccabees The presence of the bell-tower (1524) remains evidence of a prior 16th-century church at the site. The present church was designed in 1782 by Giacomo Caniana, grandson of Giovanni Battista Caniana, and brought to completion in 1796-1804 by Simeone Elia, pupil of Leopold Pollak.

The interior is frescoed with decoration by Francesco Comerio. It contains two canvases, depicting the Baptism of Christ and Crucifixion with Saints by Giovanbattista Moroni. There is also a 17th-century Deposition by Gian Paolo Cavagna, a 19th-century Martirio dei sette fratelli martiri (Martyrdom of the seven brother martyrs), and a Madonna in coro additata da San Giovanni by Carlo Ceresa.
