= Villa di Serio =

- Comune
- Comune di Villa di Serio
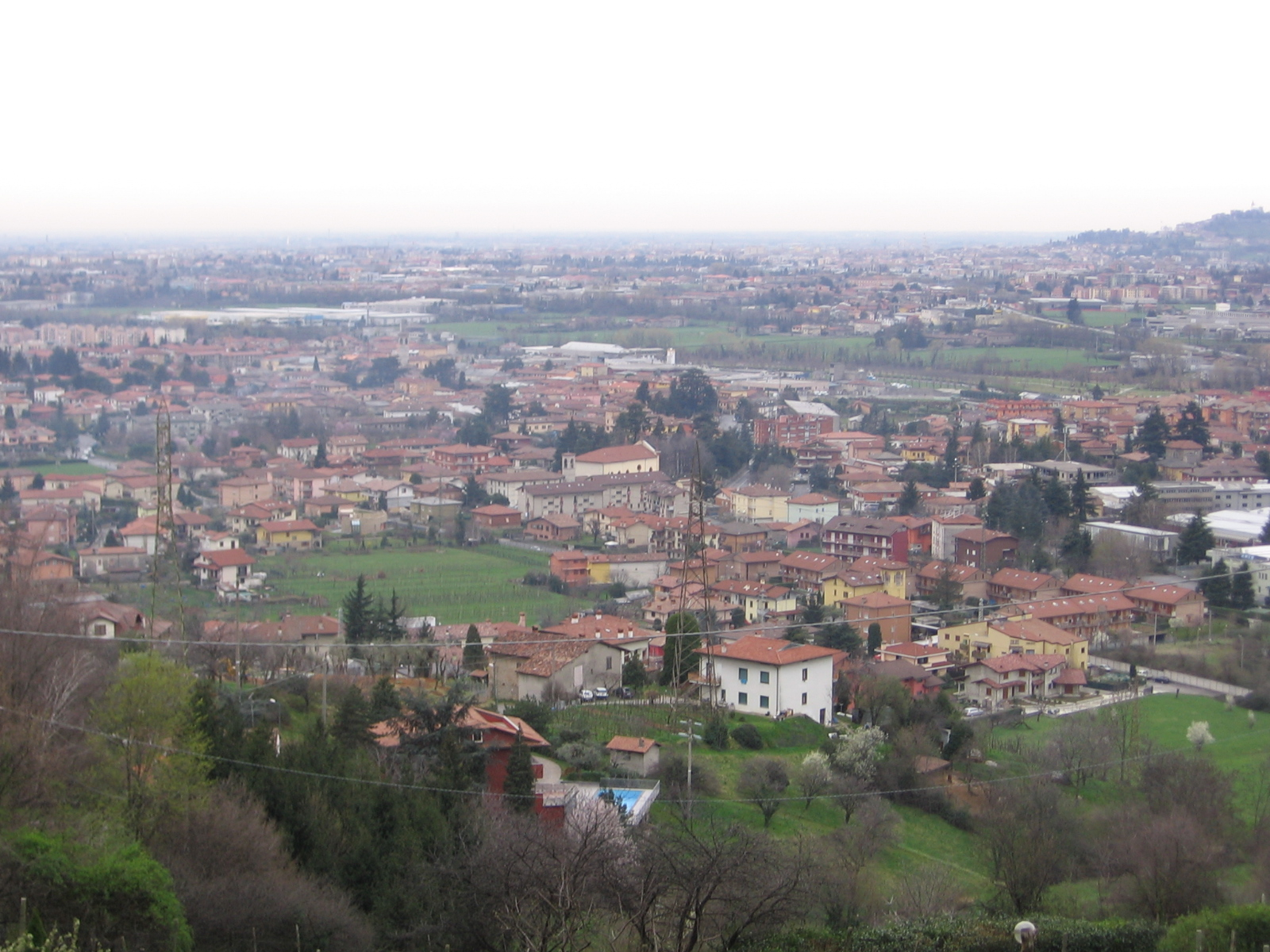
- Villa di Serio

- Location within Italy Location within Lombardy
- Coordinates: 45°43′N 9°44′E
- Country: Italy
- Region: Lombardy
- Province: Province of Bergamo (BG)
- Frazioni: Rinnovata

Area
  - Total: 4.6 km^{2} (1.8 sq mi)
- Elevation: 275 m (902 ft)

Population (Dec. 2004)
  - Total: 6,118
  - Density: 1,300/km^{2} (3,400/sq mi)
- Demonym: Villesi
- Time zone: UTC+1 (CET)
  - Summer (DST): UTC+2 (CEST)
- Postal code: 24020
- Dialing code: 035

Villa di Serio (Bergamasque: Éla de Sère) is a comune (municipality) in the Province of Bergamo in the Italian region of Lombardy, located about 50 kilometres (31 mi) northeast of Milan and about 6 kilometres (4 mi) northeast of Bergamo. As of 31 December 2004, it had a population of 6,118 and an area of 4.6 square kilometres (1.8 mi^{2}).

The municipality of Villa di Serio contains the frazione (subdivision) Rinnovata.

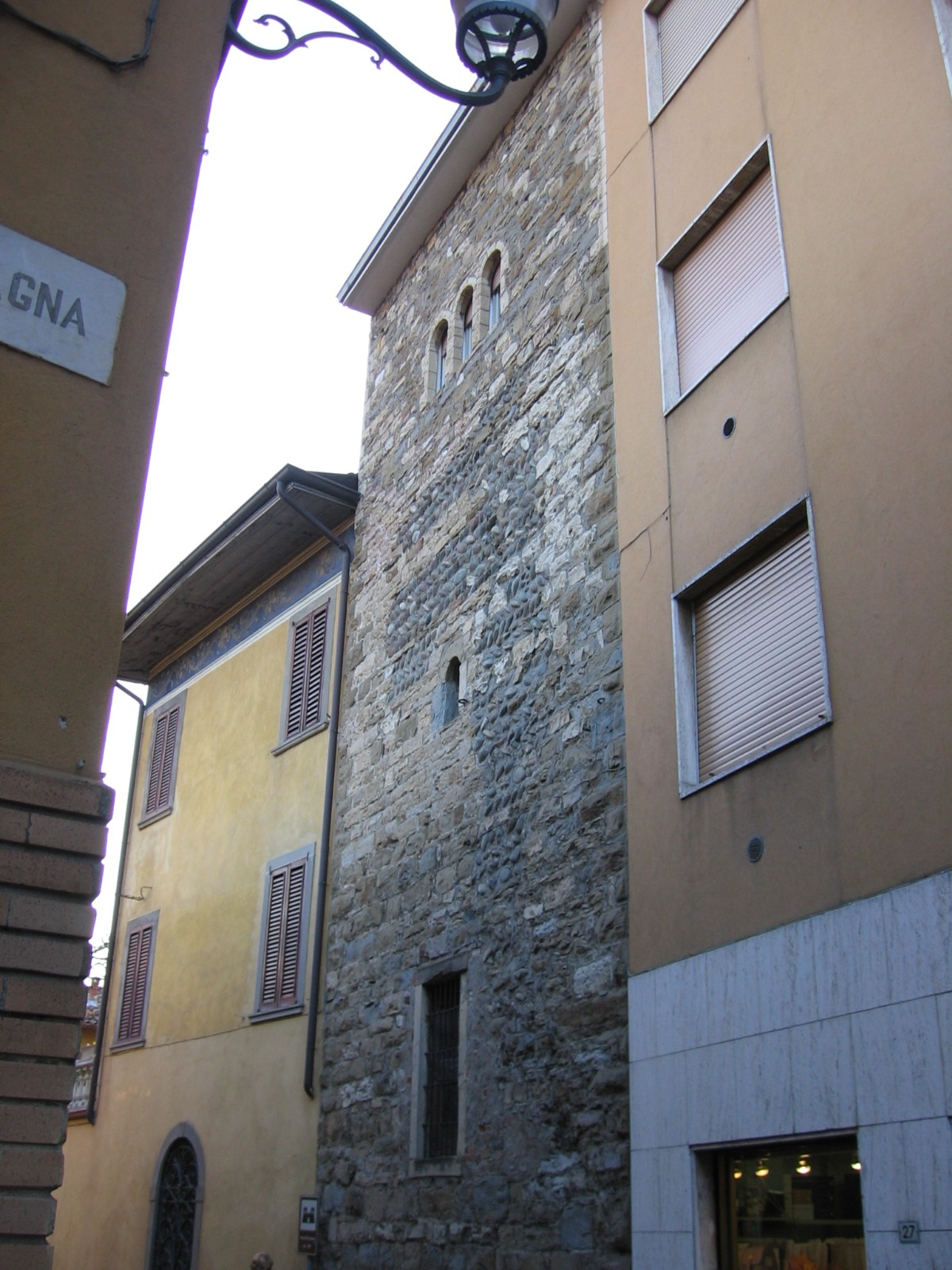
the torre della Piazza

Villa di Serio borders the following municipalities: Alzano Lombardo, Nembro, Ranica, Scanzorosciate.

== Demographic evolution ==
Historical population

Year	Pop.	±%
1861	984	—
1871	941	−4.4%
1881	1,067	+13.4%
1901	1,402	+31.4%
1911	1,705	+21.6%

Year	Pop.	±%
1921	1,876	+10.0%
1931	2,062	+9.9%
1936	2,012	−2.4%
1951	2,412	+19.9%
1961	2,884	+19.6%

Year	Pop.	±%
1971	3,383	+17.3%
1981	3,952	+16.8%
1991	5,162	+30.6%
2001	5,837	+13.1%

Source: Data from ISTAT
