= Cenate Sotto =

- Comune
- Comune di Cenate Sotto
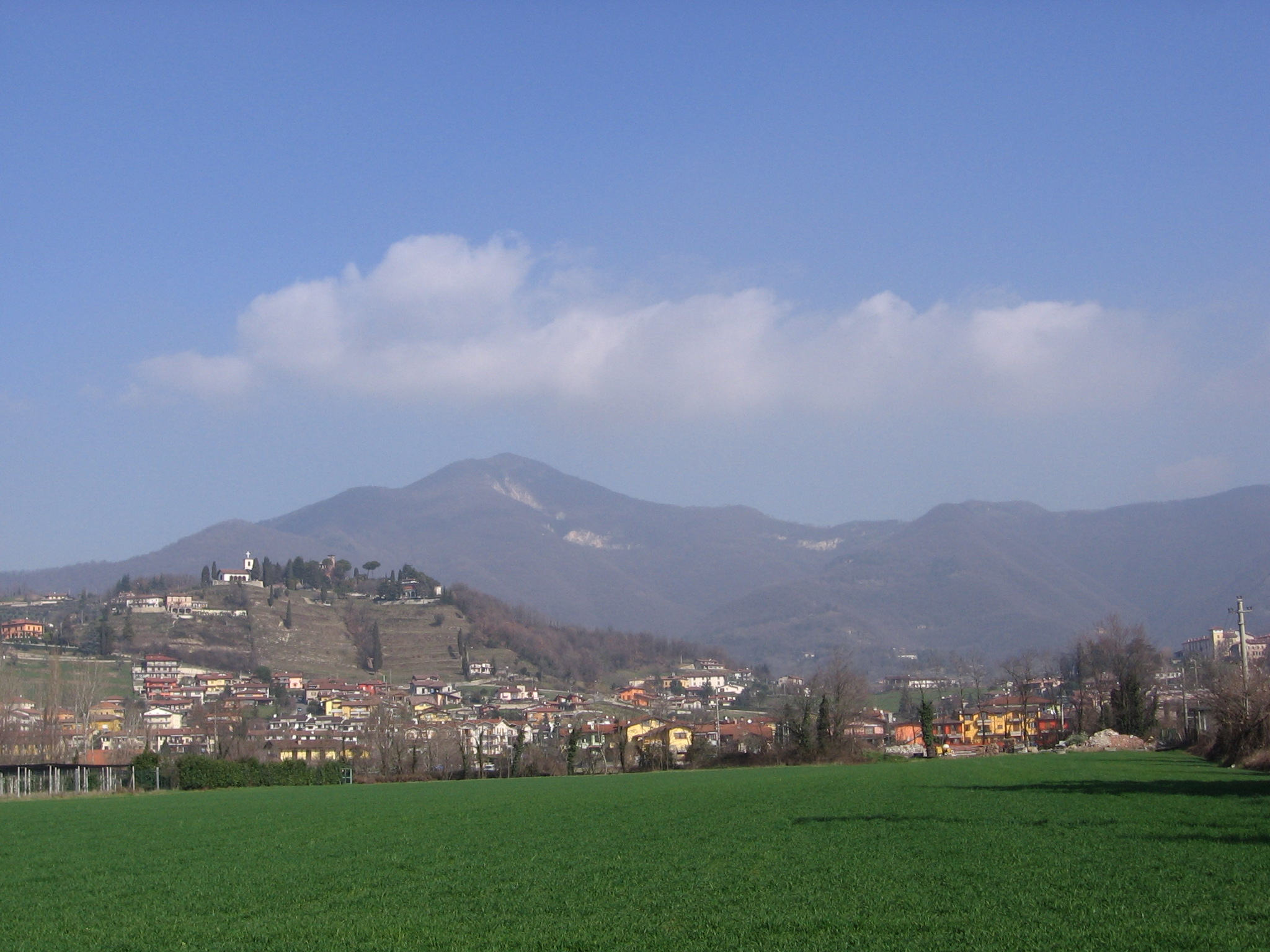
- Cenate Sotto

- Location within Italy Location within Lombardy
- Coordinates: 45°42′N 9°49′E
- Country: Italy
- Region: Lombardy
- Province: Province of Bergamo (BG)
- Frazioni: Cascina Serbello, Tesolta, Quadra, Veneziane, Brugaletti

Government
  - Mayor: Thomas Algeri

Area
  - Total: 4.5 km^{2} (1.7 sq mi)
- Elevation: 267 m (876 ft)

Population (Dec. 2004)
  - Total: 2,947
  - Density: 650/km^{2} (1,700/sq mi)
- Demonym: Cenatesi
- Time zone: UTC+1 (CET)
  - Summer (DST): UTC+2 (CEST)
- Postal code: 24069
- Dialing code: 035
- Website: Official website

Cenate Sotto (Bergamasque: Senàt Sota) is a comune (municipality) in the Province of Bergamo in the Italian region of Lombardy, located about 60 kilometres (37 mi) northeast of Milan and about 12 kilometres (7 mi) east of Bergamo. As of 31 December 2004, it had a population of 2,947 and an area of 4.5 square kilometres (1.7 mi^{2}).

The municipality of Cenate Sotto contains the frazioni (subdivisions, mainly villages and hamlets) Cascina Serbello, Tesolta, Quadra, Veneziane, and Brugaletti.

Cenate Sotto borders the following municipalities: Cenate Sopra, San Paolo d'Argon, Scanzorosciate, Trescore Balneario.

== Demographic evolution ==
Historical population

Year	Pop.	±%
1861	1,171	—
1871	1,227	+4.8%
1881	1,220	−0.6%
1901	1,419	+16.3%
1911	1,500	+5.7%

Year	Pop.	±%
1921	1,512	+0.8%
1931	1,547	+2.3%
1936	1,574	+1.7%
1951	1,680	+6.7%
1961	1,614	−3.9%

Year	Pop.	±%
1971	1,614	+0.0%
1981	1,813	+12.3%
1991	2,181	+20.3%
2001	2,670	+22.4%

Source: Data from ISTAT
