= Foramen of Panizza =

The foramen of Panizza (named for anatomist Bartolomeo Panizza) is a hole that connects the left and right aorta as they leave the heart of all animals of the order Crocodilia. Crocodilians have a completely separated ventricle with deoxygenated blood from the body, or systemic circulation, in the right ventricle and oxygenated blood from the lungs, or pulmonary circulation, in the left ventricle, as in birds and mammals.

Two vessels, the left aorta and the pulmonary artery, exit the right ventricle. Blood from the right ventricle goes to the lungs through the pulmonary artery, as in mammals and birds. However, when a unique active valve leading to the pulmonary artery contracts, pressure in the right ventricle can increase, and blood can leave the right ventricle, enter the left aortic arch, and therefore bypass the pulmonary circulation.

The foramen of Panizza connects the left and right aorta. Deoxygenated blood from the right ventricle, sitting in the left aorta, can flow into the right aorta through the foramen of Panizza. When the heart is relaxed, some oxygenated blood from the left ventricle, sitting in the right aorta, can flow into the left aorta across the foramen of Panizza. However, some species of crocodilians have regulatory sphincters that prevent unwanted flow of blood through the foramen of Panizza during non-diving.
