= San Paolo d'Argon =

- Comune
- Comune di San Paolo d'Argon
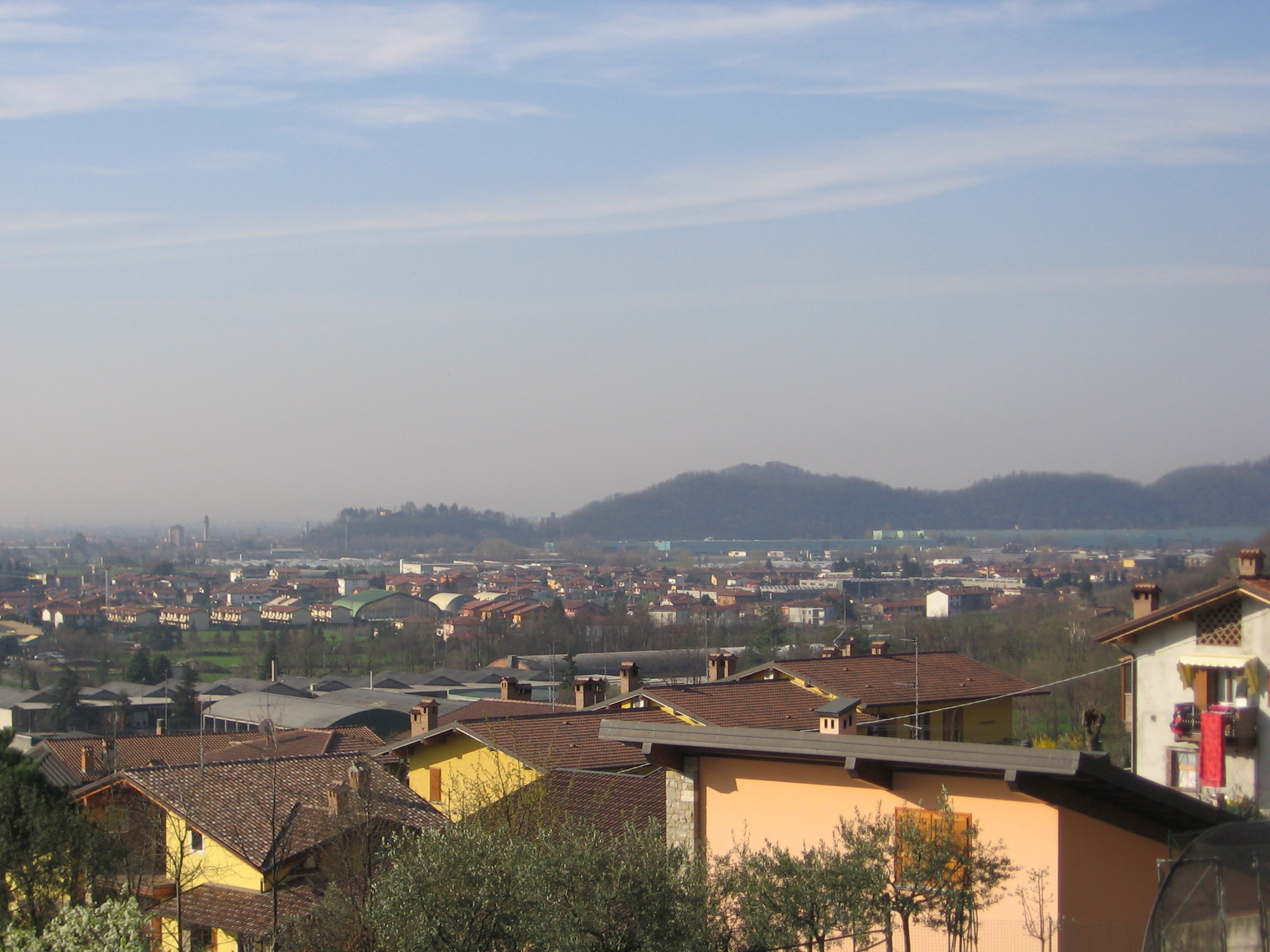

- Coat of arms

- Location within Italy Location within Lombardy
- Coordinates: 45°41′N 9°48′E
- Country: Italy
- Region: Lombardy
- Province: Bergamo (BG)

Government
  - Mayor: Stefano Cortinovis (Lista Civica)

Area
  - Total: 5.25 km^{2} (2.03 sq mi)
- Elevation: 255 m (837 ft)

Population (12-31-16)
  - Total: 5,721
  - Density: 1,090/km^{2} (2,820/sq mi)
- Demonym: Sampaolesi
- Time zone: UTC+1 (CET)
  - Summer (DST): UTC+2 (CEST)
- Postal code: 24060
- Dialing code: 035
- Patron saint: San Mauro
- Saint day: 15 January
- Website: Official website

San Paolo d'Argon (Bergamasque: San Pól d'Àrgon) is a comune (municipality) of 5,721 inhabitants in the Province of Bergamo in the Italian region of Lombardy, located about 60 kilometres (37 mi) northeast of Milan and about 11 kilometres (7 mi) east of Bergamo. The commune is located at the beginning of the Cavallina Valley and it's crossed by two main roads: the Strada Statale 42 del Tonale e della Mendola and the Provincial Road 91 to the Lake Iseo.

It is home to a large Cluniac monastery, founded in 1079. It was restored in the 16th century, as shown by the perfectly geometrical Renaissance cloisters (1500 and 1532). In the former refectory there are frescoes (1624) by Giovanni Battista Lorenzetti. The annexed church, dedicated to the Conversion of Saint Paul, was rebuilt between 1684 and 1690 on an ancient romanesque one and represents one of the most impressive examples of Baroque architecture in Bergamo. Its white façade in local marble dates back to 1690. The single wide nave's vault is completely decorated with frescoes by Giulio Quaglio (1712–13). Three little chapels open up on the two sides of the nave. Other artworks include canvasses by Giuseppe Maria Crespi, Sebastiano Ricci and Antonio Balestra. The bell tower was rebuilt in 1738 as reported on its eastern side too.

Until the early 20th century, the town was known as Buzzone, while the name "San Paolo d'Argon" designed the monastic complex. From 1929 to 1948 San Paolo d'Argon was united with the neighbouring villages of Cenate Sotto and Cenate Sopra forming a single commune called Cenate d'Argon.

== Sport ==
The main football team of the municipality is the San Paolo d'Argon, which currently plays in the Lombard league of promotion. In the past the team played for seven consecutive seasons in the National Amateur Championship (the current Serie D), since 1991, the year in which it ended the championship in fourth place in the standings, until 1998, when it closed his group to the penultimate place in the standings, thus relegating to Excellence.

In the village there is another sport, the MTB school San Paolo d'Argon (mountain bike). It was founded in 2005 with 35 associates and headed by President Gherardi Stefano. The teams are divided into three levels: very young (7-12 years), rookies (13-16 years) and juniors (17-18 years). The rookie team won two medals in the 2012 regional championship and the second place in the Italian league for the company in Piacenza.
