= Cenate Sopra =

- Comune
- Comune di Cenate Sopra
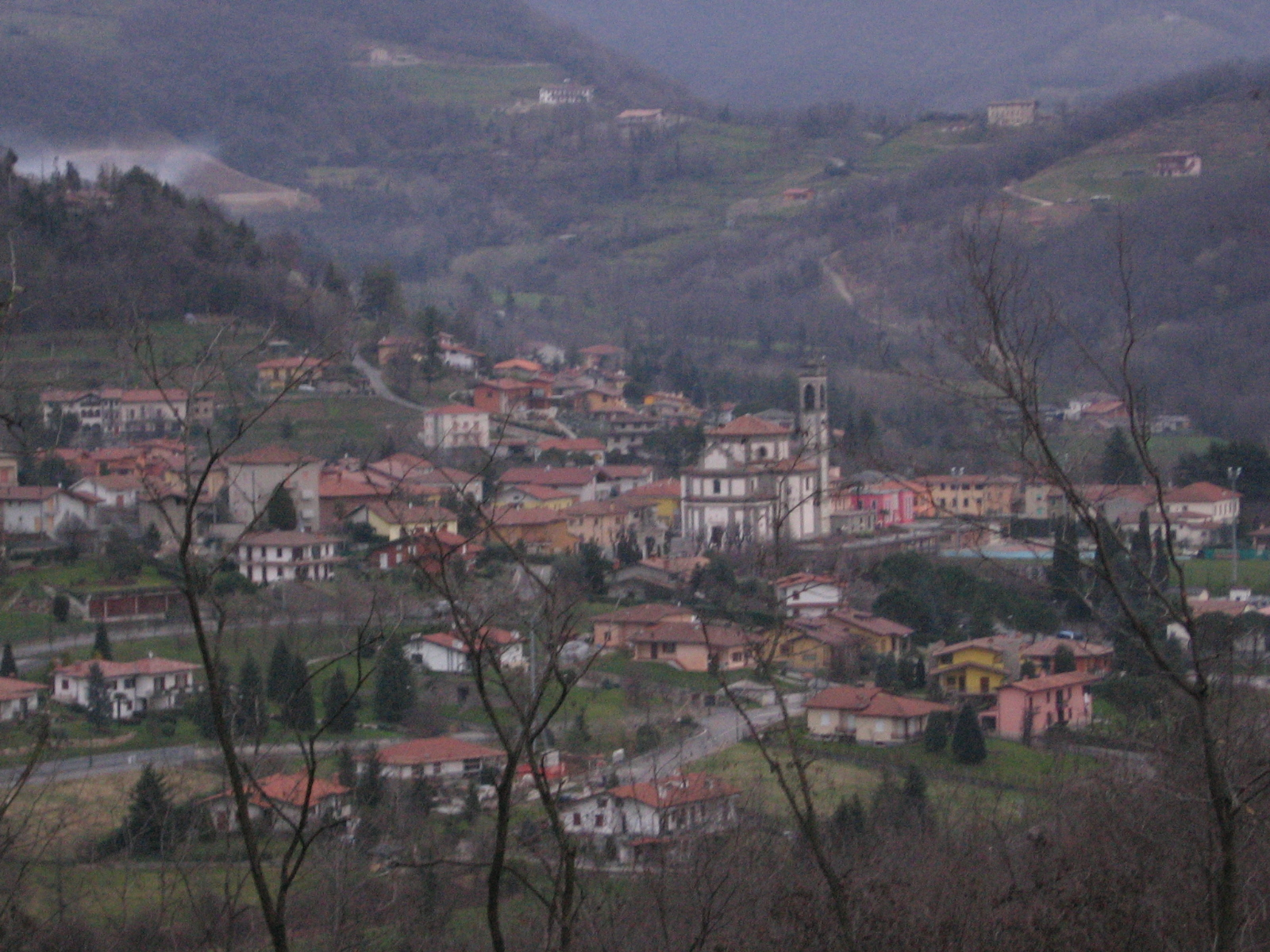
- Cenate Sopra

- Location within Italy Location within Lombardy
- Coordinates: 45°43′N 9°49′E
- Country: Italy
- Region: Lombardy
- Province: Province of Bergamo (BG)
- Frazioni: Sant'Ambrogio, Valpredina, Piazze

Government
  - Mayor: Claudia Colleoni

Area
  - Total: 6.9 km^{2} (2.7 sq mi)
- Elevation: 330 m (1,080 ft)

Population (Dec. 2004)
  - Total: 2,248
  - Density: 330/km^{2} (840/sq mi)
- Demonym: Sanleonesi
- Time zone: UTC+1 (CET)
  - Summer (DST): UTC+2 (CEST)
- Postal code: 24069
- Dialing code: 035

Cenate Sopra (Bergamasque: Senàt Sura) is a comune (municipality) in the Province of Bergamo in the Italian region of Lombardy, located about 60 kilometres (37 mi) northeast of Milan and about 12 kilometres (7.5 mi) east of Bergamo. As of 31 December 2004, it had a population of 2,248 and an area of 6.9 square kilometres (2.7 mi^{2}).

The municipality of Cenate Sopra contains the frazioni (subdivisions, mainly villages and hamlets) Sant'Ambrogio, Valpredina, and Piazze.

Cenate Sopra borders the following municipalities: Albino, Cenate Sotto, Pradalunga, Scanzorosciate, Trescore Balneario.

== Demographic evolution ==
Historical population

| Year | Pop. | ±% |
|---|---|---|
| 1861 | 1,034 | — |
| 1871 | 1,135 | +9.8% |
| 1881 | 1,118 | −1.5% |
| 1901 | 1,270 | +13.6% |
| 1911 | 1,426 | +12.3% |

| Year | Pop. | ±% |
|---|---|---|
| 1921 | 1,568 | +10.0% |
| 1931 | 1,526 | −2.7% |
| 1936 | 1,468 | −3.8% |
| 1951 | 1,436 | −2.2% |
| 1961 | 1,220 | −15.0% |

| Year | Pop. | ±% |
|---|---|---|
| 1971 | 1,205 | −1.2% |
| 1981 | 1,396 | +15.9% |
| 1991 | 1,639 | +17.4% |
| 2001 | 2,082 | +27.0% |

Source: Data from ISTAT
