= Bartolomeo Panizza =

Italian politician

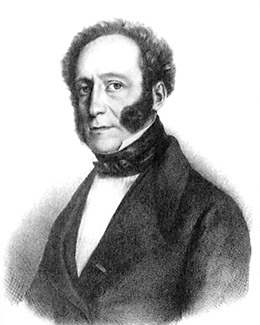
Bartolomeo Panizza

Bartolomeo Panizza (August 17, 1785 – April 17, 1867) was an Italian anatomist born in Vicenza.

He received a medical degree in surgery from Padua, and furthered his studies at Bologna and Pavia. In 1809 he became a professor at the University of Pavia, and in 1835 a member of the Academia nazionale delle scienze (National Academy of Science). Panizza was a student and associate to famed anatomist Antonio Scarpa (1752-1832).

He was the first physician to attribute the vision function to the posterior cortex. (Note: See, more precisely, Visual cortex.) He published his findings in an 1855 treatise titled "Osservazioni sul nervo ottico" (Observations on the Optic Nerve). At the time, his discovery was largely ignored, and it would be several years until the importance of Panizza's findings were realized.

In 1833 he described the "foramen of Panizza", defined as a hole with a valve that connects the left aorta with right aorta in the crocodilian heart. This connection causes a slight mixing of blood, whereby oxygenated and deoxygenated blood are co-mingled within the heart, before being pumped throughout the crocodile's body. This helps extend the amount of time a crocodile can remain under water. In addition, he is also remembered for studies involving the lymphatic system of reptiles. The eponymous "Panizza's plexuses" are defined as two plexuses of lymph vessels located in the lateral fossae of the frenulum of the prepuce.

Panizza died in 1867 in Pavia.

== Panizza's landmarks in Pavia ==
In Pavia some landmarks stand as Panizza's memory.

- A marble statue, in a yard ("Cortile delle Statue") of the old buildings of the University of Pavia, at N.65 of the central "Strada Nuova". On the basement, there is the following inscription in Italian language: "A BARTOLOMEO PANIZZA / I DISCEPOLI E GLI AMMIRATORI / A. MDCCCLXXIII" (To Bartolomeo Panizza / The disciples and the admirers / Year 1873).
- Panizza's tomb in the Monumental Cemetery of Pavia (viale San Giovannino). Along the central lane, on the left, just between the tombs of two other important scientists, Adelchi Negri and Camillo Golgi, the funereal monument has a pyramid shape quite sweetened by a marble cloth. Under the bronze medallion representing the scientist's profile, there is the following inscription in Italian language: "AL COMMENDATORE / BARTOLOMEO PANIZZA / PROFESSORE DI ANATOMIA SENATORE DEL REGNO / INSIGNE DI DOTTRINA / POPOLARMENTE AMATO / PER ANIMO INTEGRO SCHIETTO GENEROSO / VISSUTO 81 ANNI SINO A 17 APRILE 1867 / I FIGLI E LE FIGLIE / ONORATI DEL NOME GRATI DELL'AFFETTO / PREGANDO E LAGRIMANDO (POSERO?)".
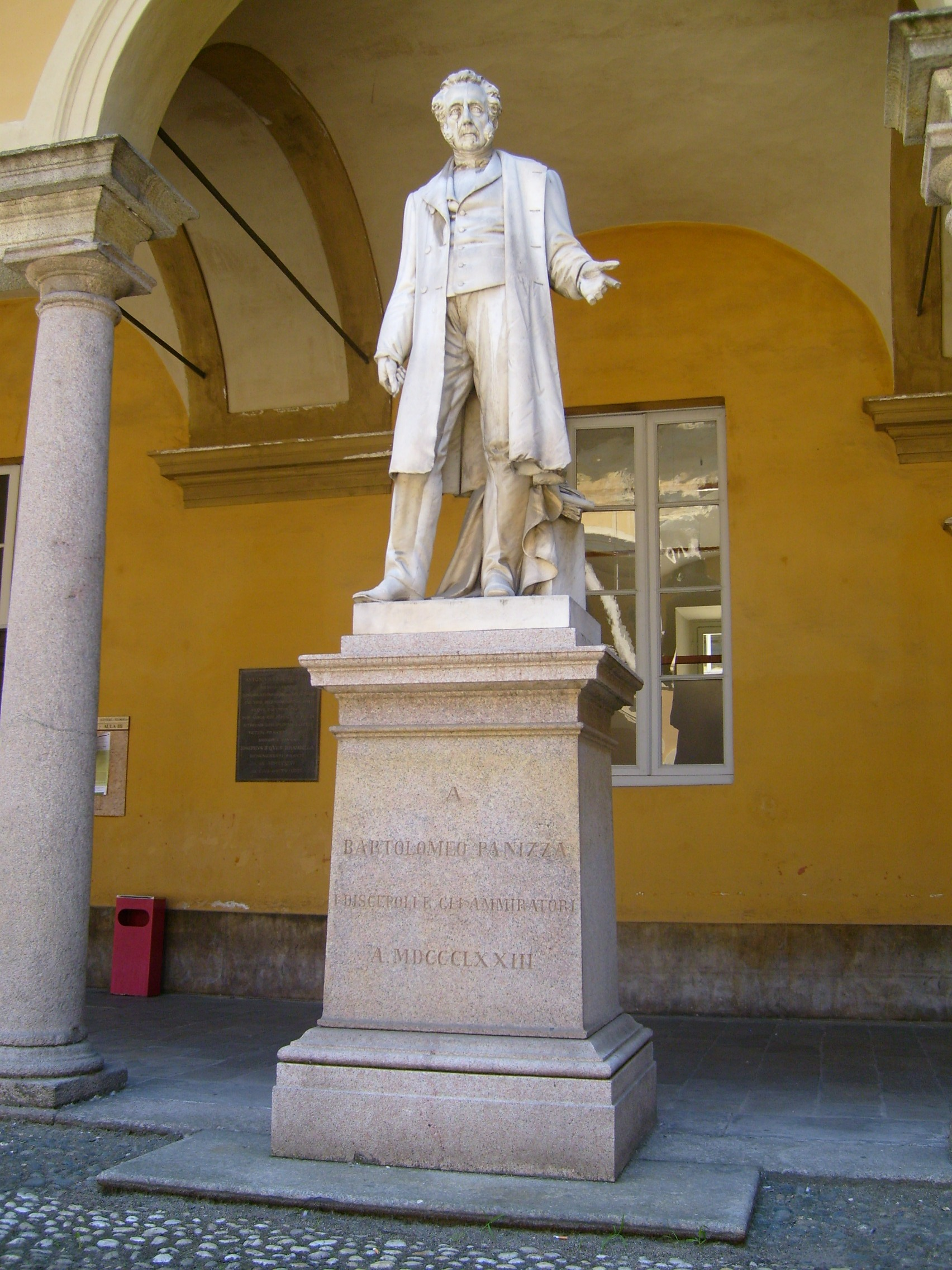
the statue

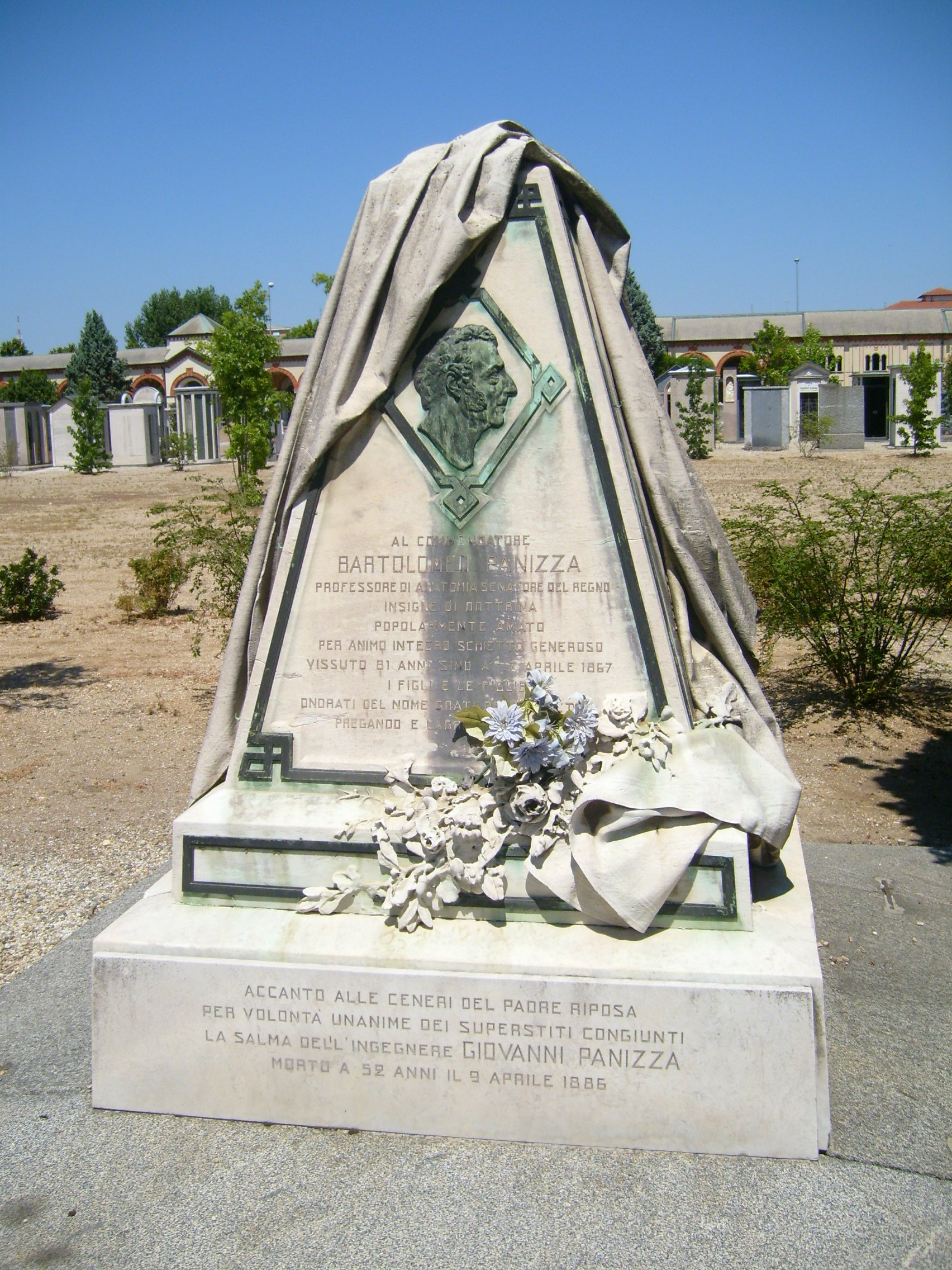
the tomb

== Notes ==
This article incorporates translated text from an equivalent article at the Italian Wikipedia, whose sources include Panizza, Bartolomeo Treccani.it
