= Serio (river) =

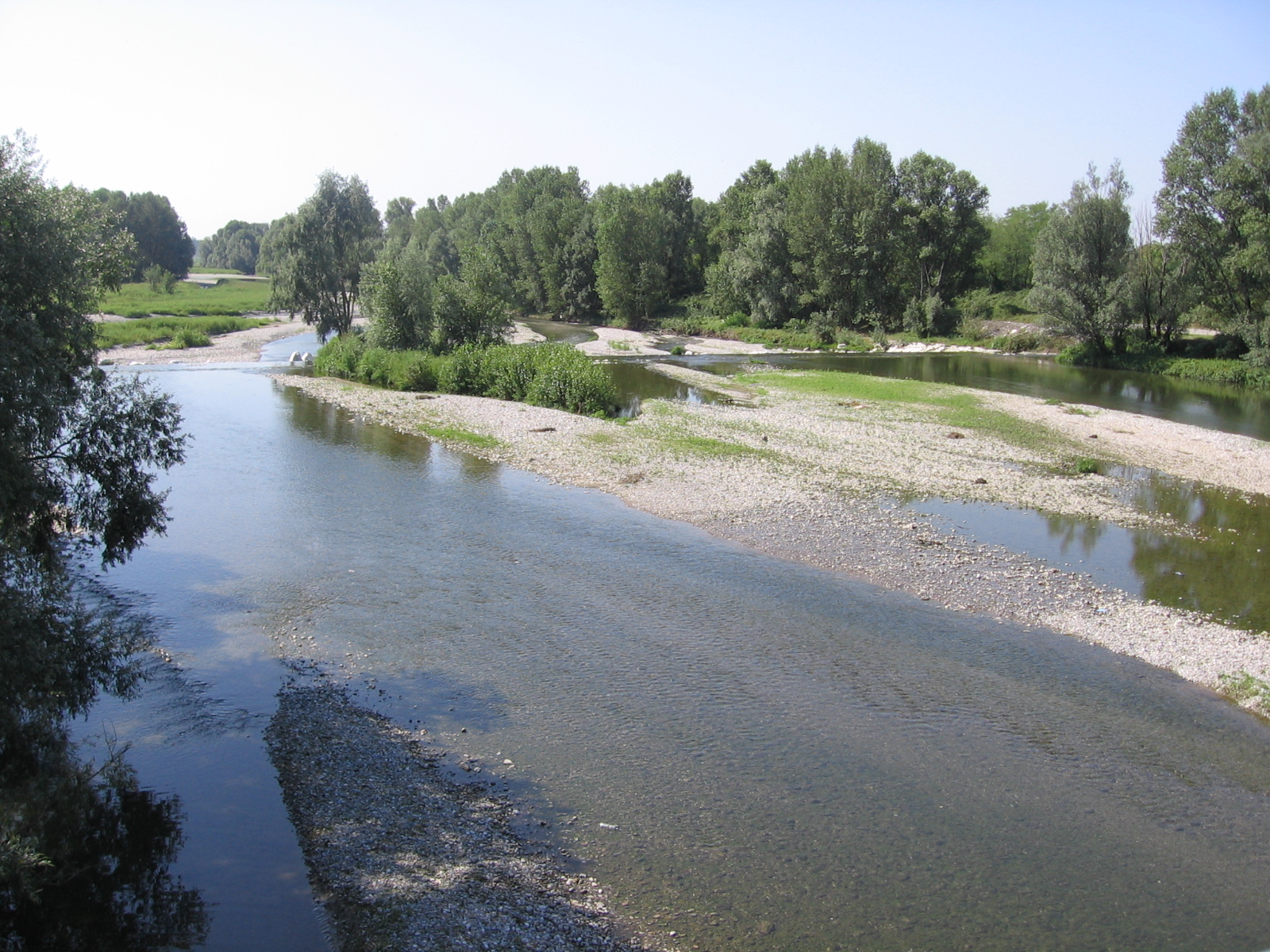

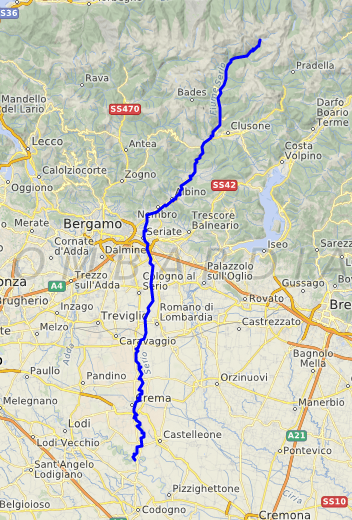

Location
- Country: Italy

Physical characteristics
- Source
  - location: Monte Torena, Italy
  - elevation: 2,583 m (8,474 ft)
- Mouth: Adda
  - location: Bocca di Serio, south of Crema
  - coordinates: 45.2581°N 9.6936°E
- Length: 124 km (77 mi)

Basin features
- Progression: Adda→ Po→ Adriatic Sea
- Tributaries
  - left: Bondione, Ogna, Romna
  - right: Acqualina, Morla

The Serio (Lombard: Sère) is an Italian river that flows entirely within Lombardy, crossing the provinces of Bergamo and Cremona. It is 124 kilometres (77 mi) long and flows into the Adda at Bocca di Serio south of Crema. Similar to all Lombardian rivers, it forms part of the Po drainage area.

Its valley is known as the Val Seriana.
