= Torre Boldone =

- Comune
- Comune di Torre Boldone
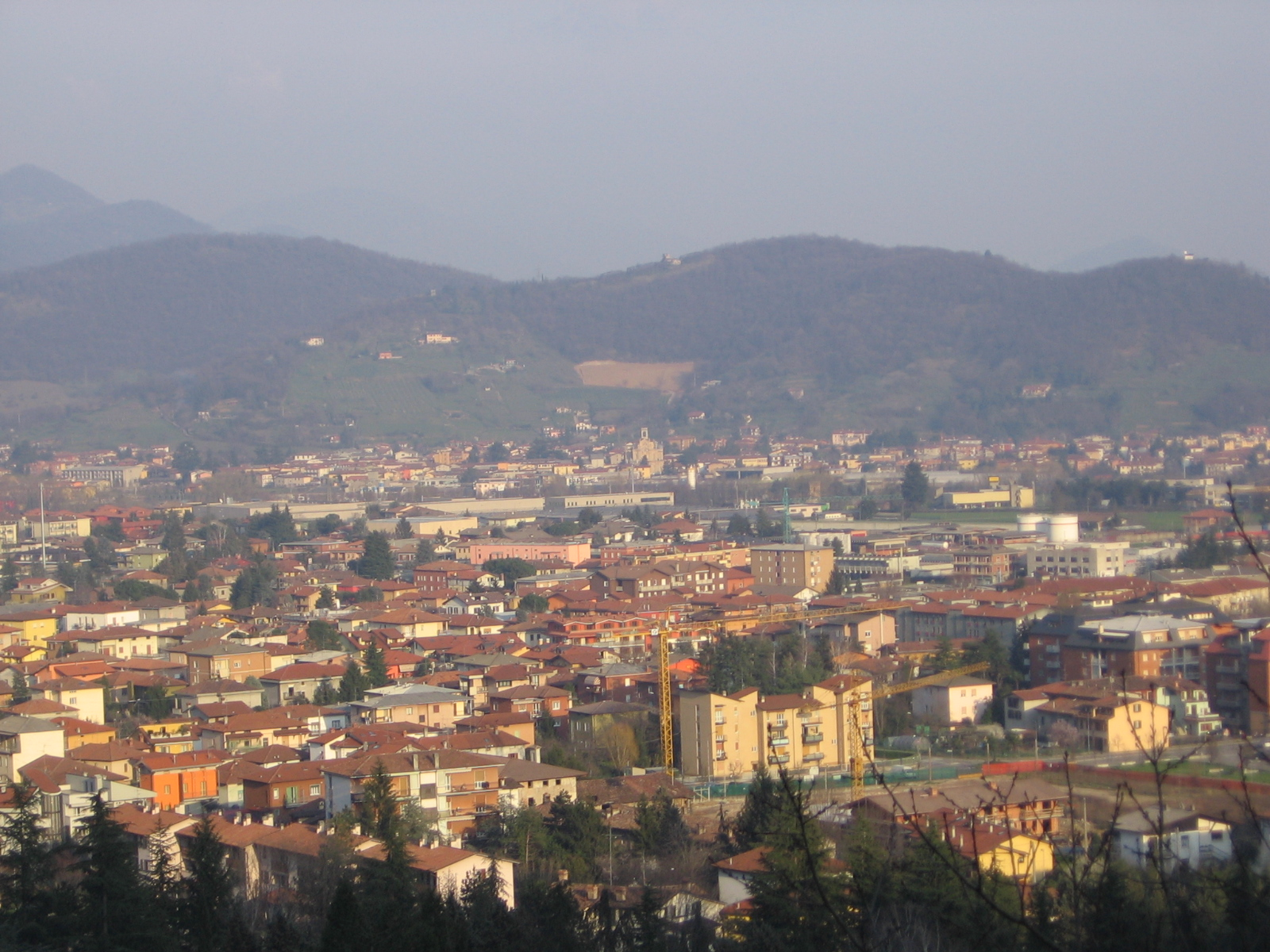

- Coat of arms

- Location within Italy Location within Lombardy
- Coordinates: 45°43′N 9°42′E
- Country: Italy
- Region: Lombardy
- Province: Bergamo (BG)

Government
  - Mayor: Luca Macario

Area
  - Total: 3.4 km^{2} (1.3 sq mi)
- Elevation: 280 m (920 ft)

Population (Feb. 2021)
  - Total: 8,648
  - Density: 2,500/km^{2} (6,600/sq mi)
- Demonym: Torreboldonesi
- Time zone: UTC+1 (CET)
  - Summer (DST): UTC+2 (CEST)
- Postal code: 24020
- Dialing code: 035
- Patron saint: St. Martin
- Saint day: 11 November
- Website: Official website

Torre Boldone (Bergamasque: Tür Boldù) is a comune (municipality) in the Province of Bergamo in the Italian region of Lombardy, located about 50 kilometres (31 mi) northeast of Milan and about 3 kilometres (2 mi) northeast of Bergamo, at the entrance of the Valle Seriana. Part of Torre Boldone's territory is part of Parco dei Colli di Bergamo
