= Almenno =

Almenno is an area beside the river Brembo in northern Italy. It is now divided between the communes of

- Almenno San Bartolomeo
- Almenno San Salvatore
