= Brembo =

Italian automotive parts manufacturer

Coordinates: 45.685604°N 9.5953973°E

Brembo N.V.

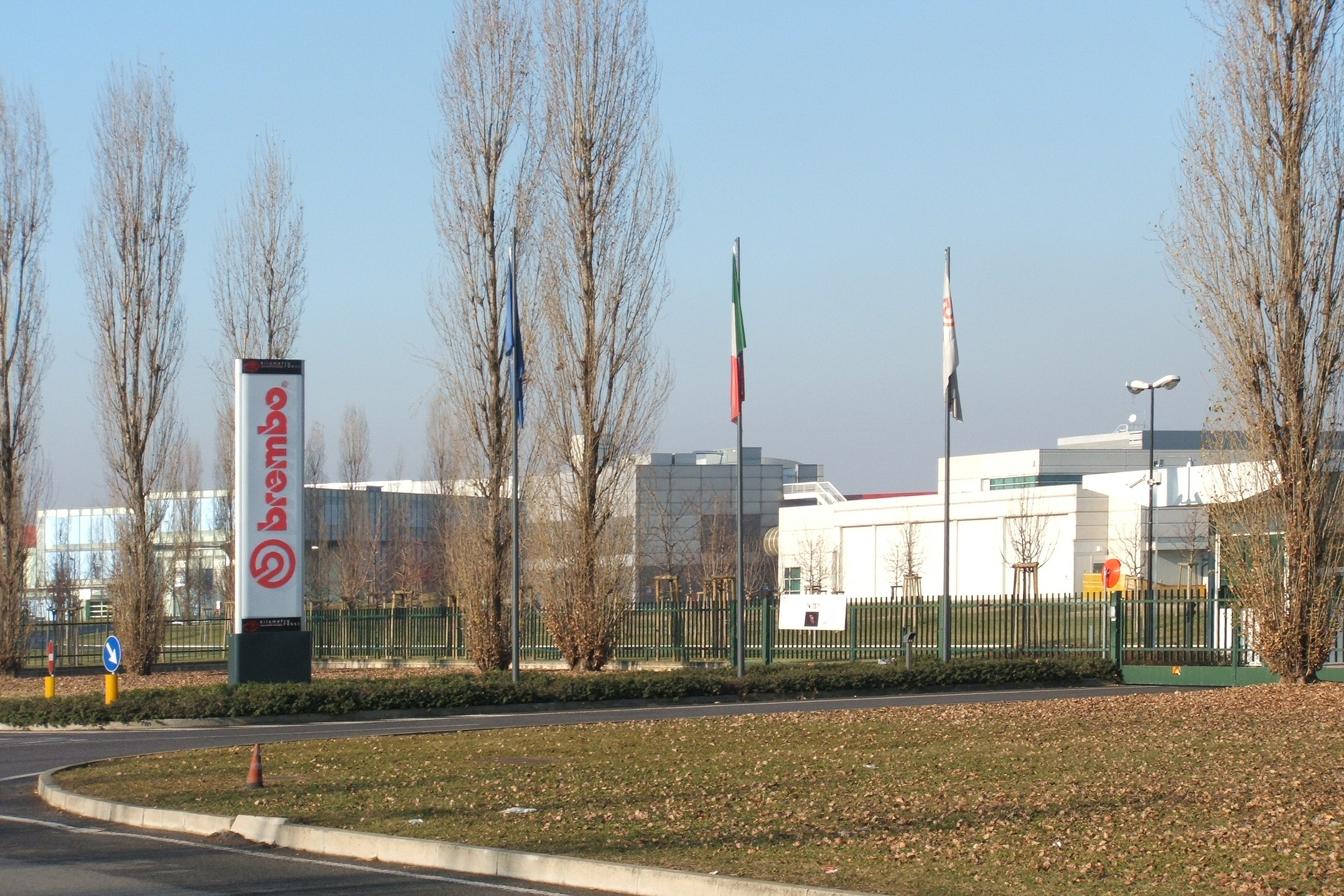
- Brembo offices in Stezzano, Italy
- Type: Naamloze vennootschap
- Traded as: BIT: BRE; FTSE Italia Mid Cap
- Industry: Automotive
- Founded: January 11, 1961; 65 years ago
- Founders: Emilio Bombassei; Italo Breda
- Headquarters: Legal Seat Amsterdam (Netherlands); Business and Corporate Address Bergamo (BG), Italy, 24126, Via Stezzano 87
- Area served: Worldwide
- Key people: Daniele Schillaci (CEO), Alberto Bombassei (Chairman)
- Products: Brakes, rims, suspension components
- Brands: Brembo; Bybre; Breco; Marchesini; AP; Öhlins
- Revenue: ▲€ 3,849.2 million (2023)
- Net income: ▼€ 305.0 million (2023)
- Number of employees: 15,653 (2023)
- Subsidiaries: AP Racing; SBS Friction; J.Juan; Öhlins
- Website: www.brembo.com www.brembogroup.com

Brembo N.V. is an Italian manufacturer of automotive parts that most notably produces braking systems for high-performance cars. Its operational head office is in Curno, Bergamo, Italy, while Amsterdam, Netherlands, is the company's legal seat.

== History ==
Brembo was established in Paladina, Italy, on January 11, 1961, by Emilio Bombassei and Italo Breda (father and uncle, respectively, to the current chairman Alberto Bombassei). The company was named after the Brembo river. Bombassei lived in a village on the coast of the river before moving to Milan. Soon after Brembo was formed, it specialized in disc brakes, which were imported from the UK at the time. The company entered into a supply contract with Alfa Romeo in 1964 and became Moto Guzzi's brake component supplier in 1966. In the 1980s, Brembo also began supplying brakes to BMW, Chrysler, Ferrari, Mercedes-Benz, Nissan, and Porsche. Brembo went public on the Milan Stock Exchange in 1995.

In 2000, Brembo purchased the UK-based racing brake and clutch manufacturer AP Racing (a former division of Automotive Products). On November 9, 2007, Brembo's North American subsidiary acquired the Automotive Brake Components division of Hayes Lemmerz. The approximately €39.6-million sale included approximately 250 employees and production facilities in Homer, Michigan and Apodaca, Mexico.

An official press release on May 21, 2014, announced an €83-million expansion of the Michigan facility. Later that year, on December 2, Brembo also announced plans to invest €32 million into a 31,500-square-meter production facility, projected to produce two million aluminum calipers annually. The expectation was initial operation by 2016 and full operation by the end of 2018.

On March 5, 2015, Brembo's deputy chairman, Matteo Tiraboschi, reported the company's 2014 sales growth of 15% up to €1.8 billion and a net profit increase of 45% to €129.1 million. He also reported the company was exploring acquiring assets, with a focus on the automotive and aviation sectors.

The company's corporate headquarters are in Stezzano, and the company has more than 10,634 employees within Italy and at branches in Brazil, China, Japan, Mexico, Poland, Spain, Sweden, the UK and the US. As of 2019, Brembo was present in 14 countries worldwide.

In October 2024, Brembo acquired Öhlins Racing for $405 million.

== Products ==
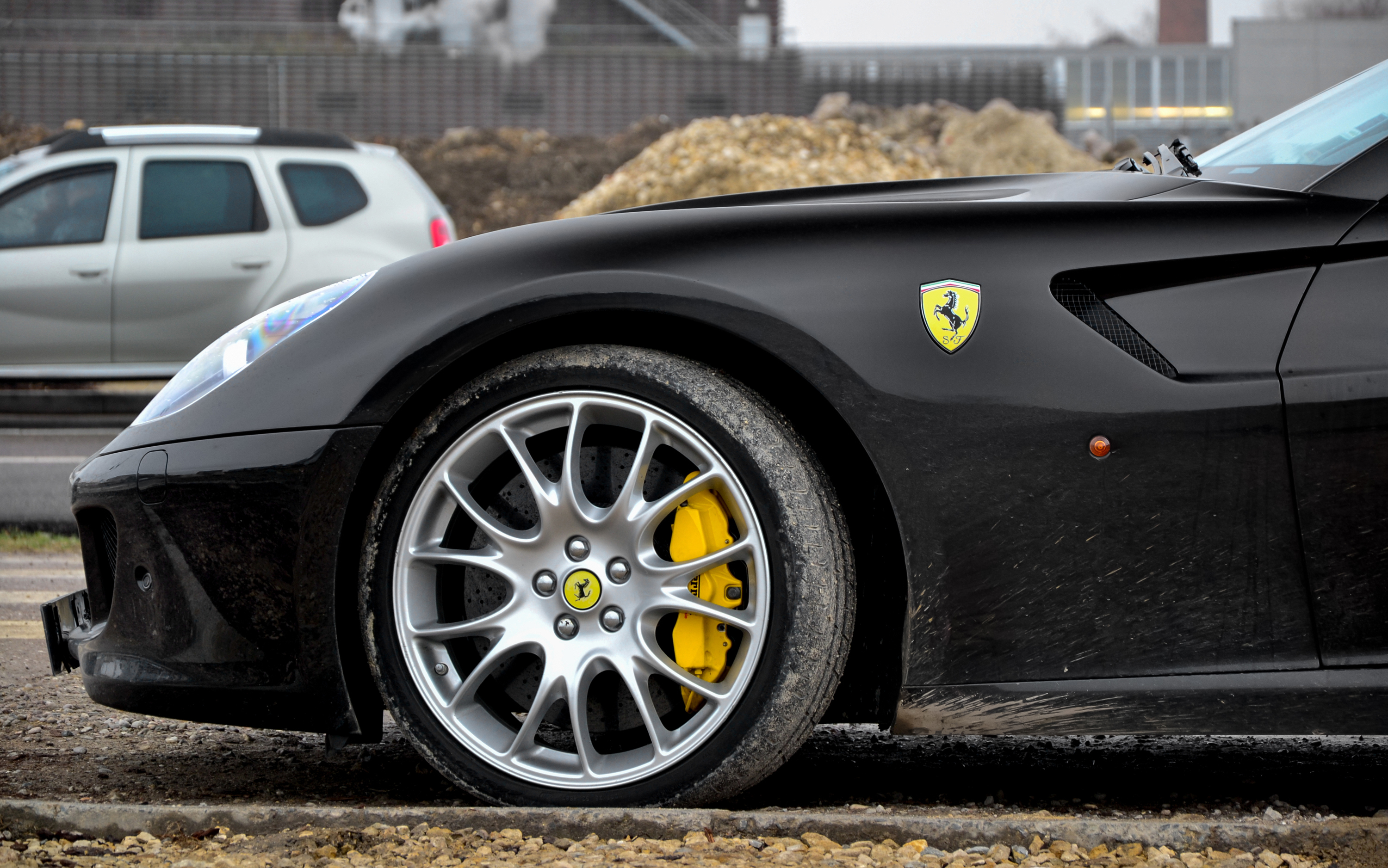
Ferrari 599 GTB Fiorano with yellow Brembo brakes

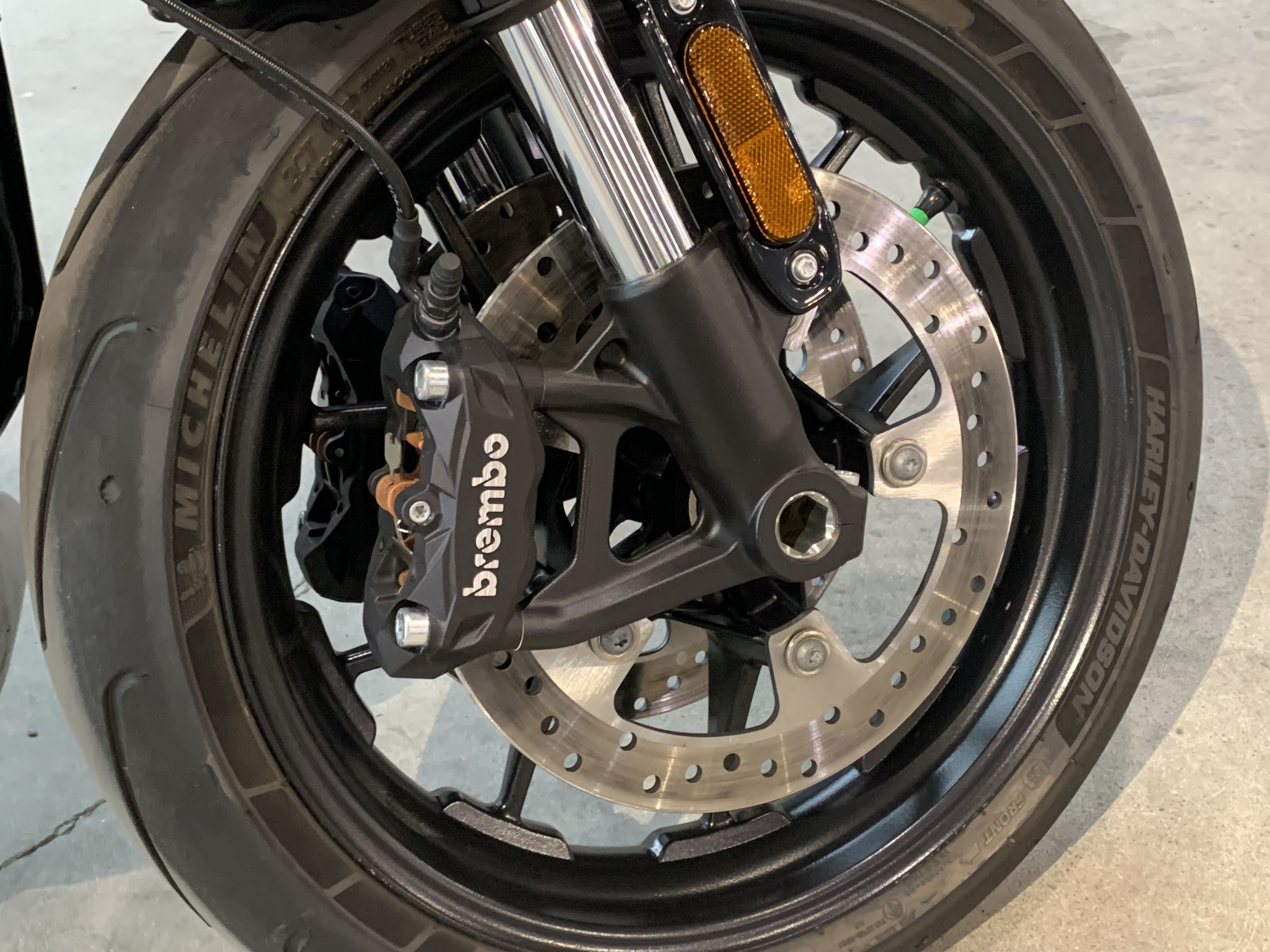
Harley-Davidson LiveWire with black Brembo brakes

Brembo specializes in performance braking systems and components as well as conducting research on braking systems. Brembo sells over 1,300 products worldwide and is known for their aftermarket automotive brake components, including calipers, drums, rotors, and brake lines. Brembo owns the foundries that produce their initial materials and supply the manufacturing plants. In all other markets, the company controls the entire production system—from raw materials through distribution. The company holds QS9000 and ISO 9001 certifications.

== Motorsport ==
Brembo is the braking systems provider for Formula One. Brembo also supplies the majority of MotoGP teams; the Gresini squad used Nissin brakes during the 2014 season and later Brembo returned again as a single brake package partner and supplier in MotoGP by 2016. Brembo was also an official brake supplier for the IndyCar Series from the 2012 season until the 2016 season; during the 2017 season, Brembo supplied calipers only. During the next season, Brembo supplied entire braking systems to all Spark Racing Technology Gen2 cars in Formula E.

Since 2005, Brembo has been an official brake caliper supplier for the GP2 Series and the FIA Formula 2 Championship. Since 2010, Brembo has been an official whole brake supplier for the GP3 Series and the FIA Formula 3 Championship. Brembo is the exclusive supplier of braking systems for the MotoE World Cup.

Brembo Is the official technology partner for the sim racing series Gran Turismo and has various braking systems that can be used in game such as carbon-ceramic brakes and Brembo calipers.

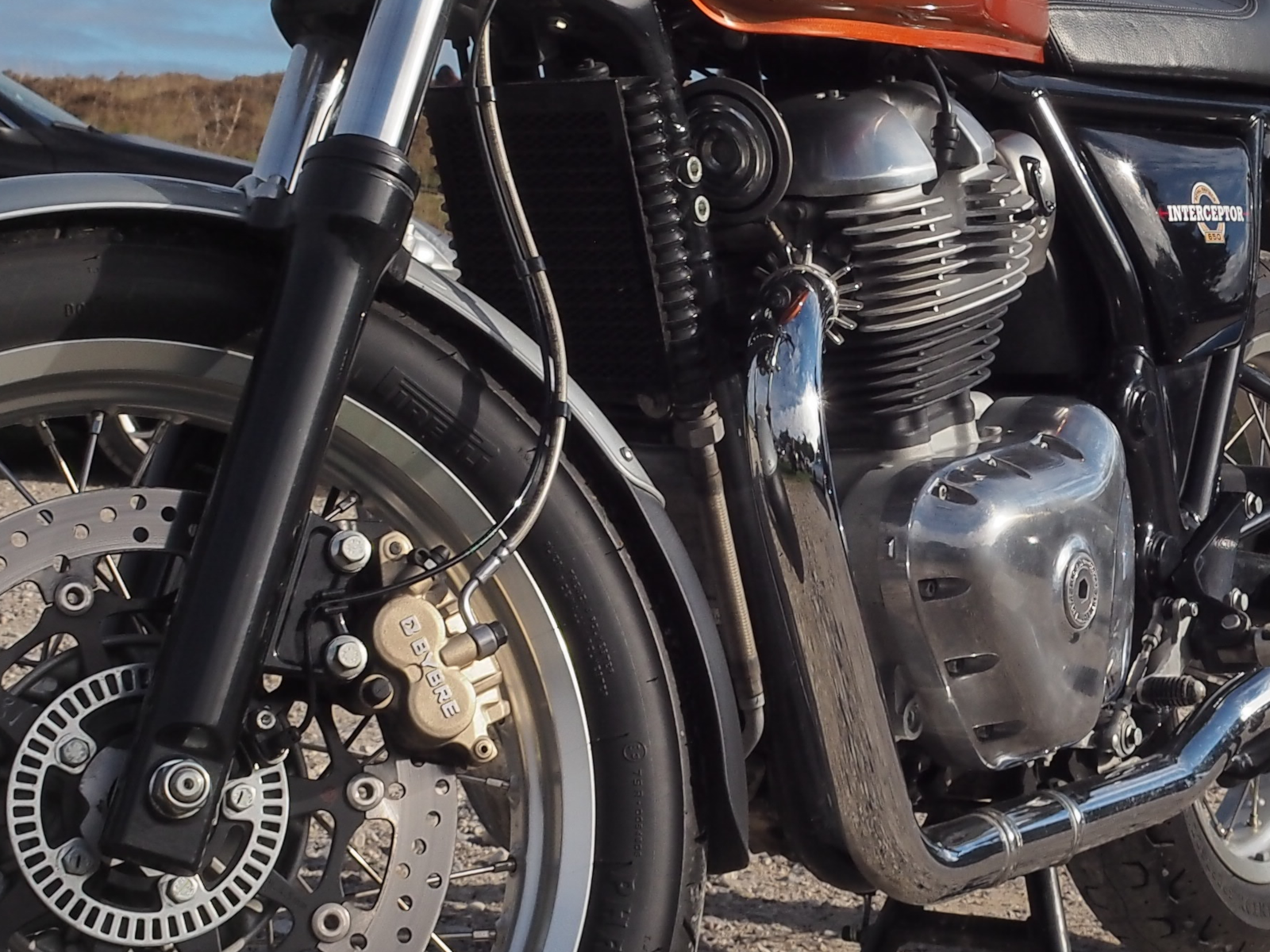
2019 Royal Enfield Interceptor 650 with ByBre brakes

== Brands ==
- AP Racing — Racing motorcycle and car clutches and brakes
- Brembo — High end brakes (flagship)
- ByBre — Small to midsize scooter and motorcycle brakes in Brazil, Russia, India, China, and Southeast Asia
- Marchesini — Wheels
- J.Juan — Motorcycle brakes
- SBS Friction — OEM and aftermarket brake pads, brake discs and clutch kits for motorcycles, scooter, racing and UTVs/SSVs/ATVs
- Öhlins — Suspension components

== See also ==
- List of Italian companies
