= Rotonda di San Tomè, Almenno San Bartolomeo =

Church building in Almenno San Bartolomeo, Italy

Coordinates: 45°44′23.4″N 9°35′34″E

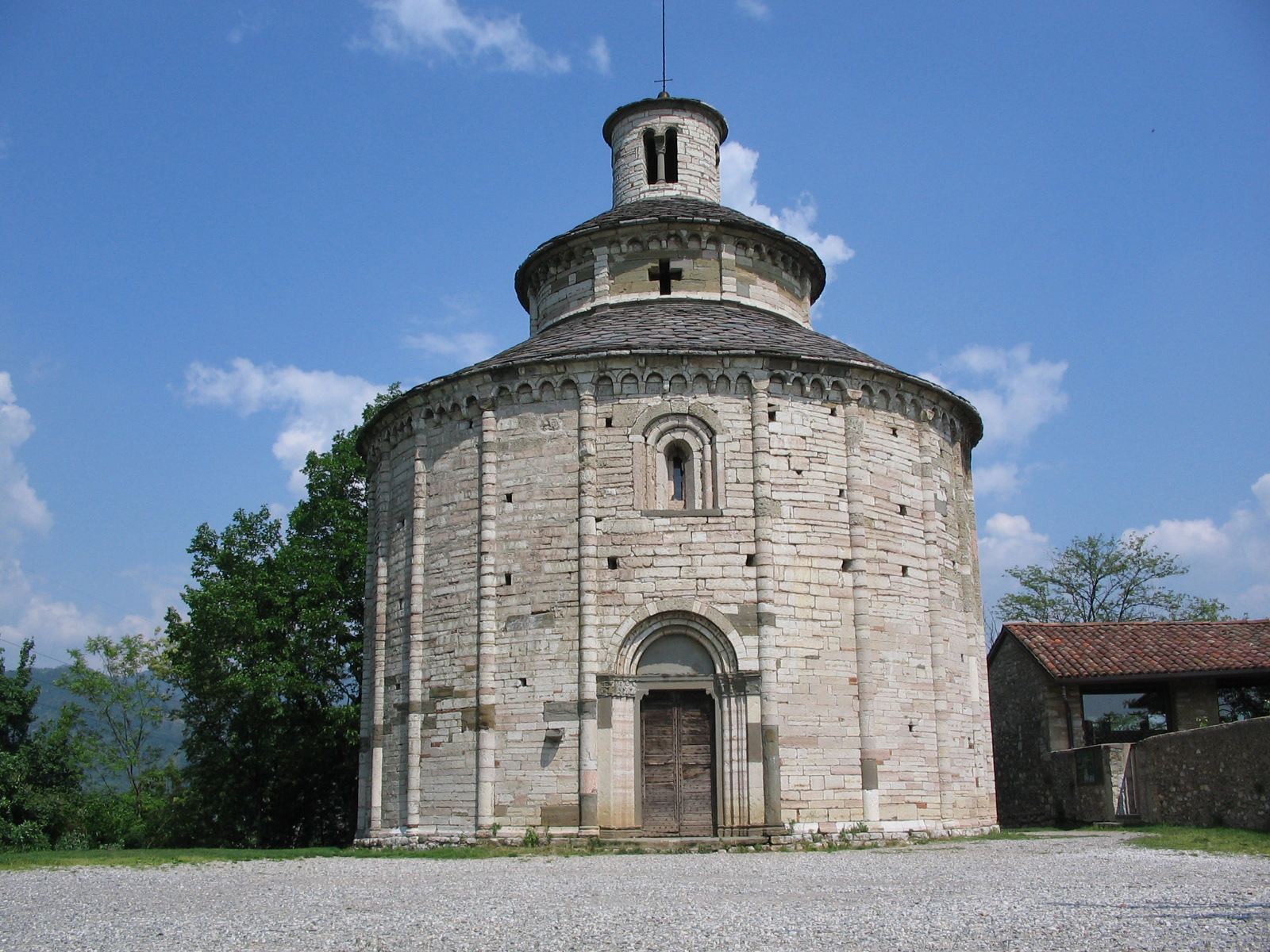
The Rotonda of San Tomè.

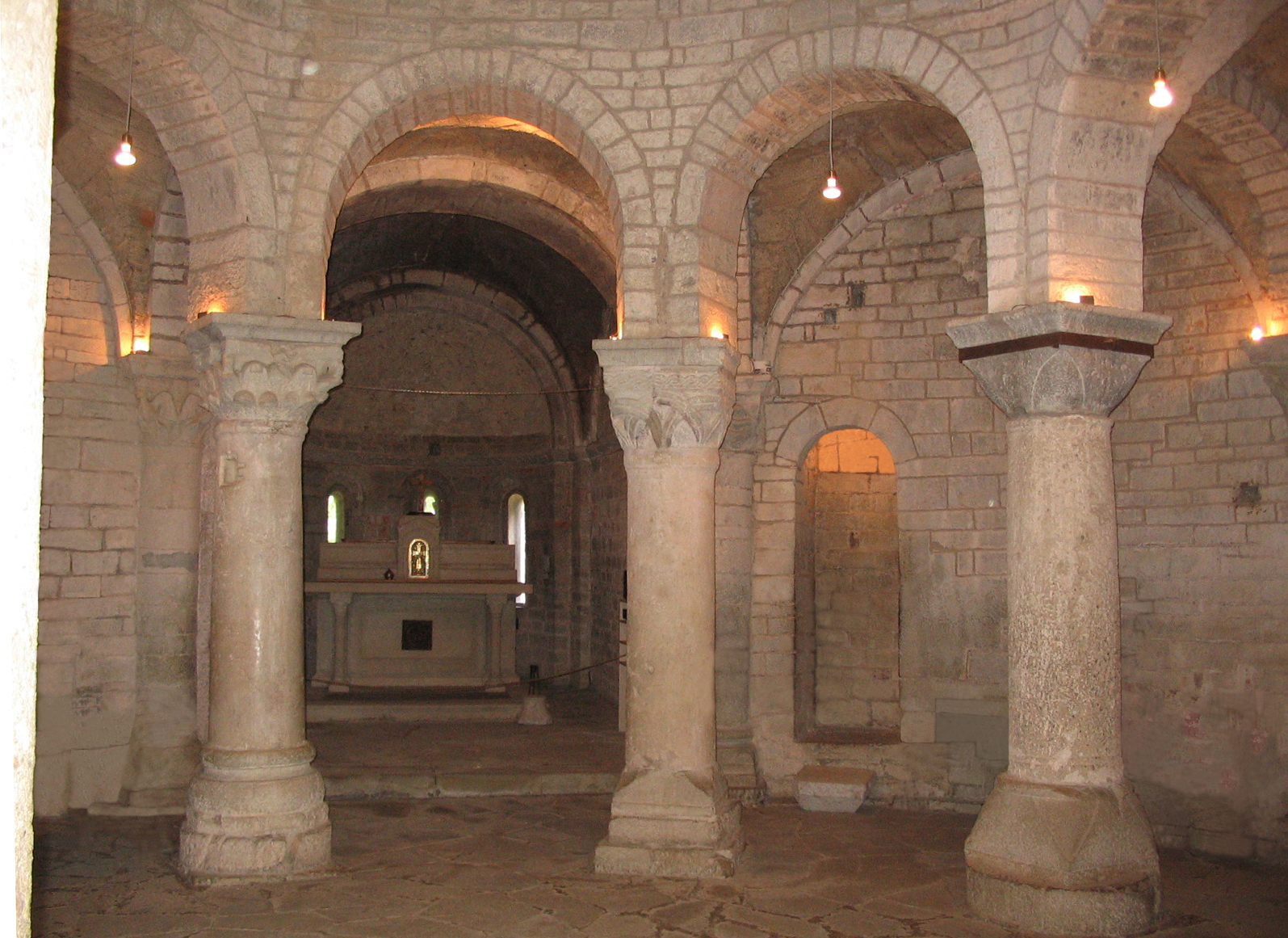
View of the interior towards the apse.

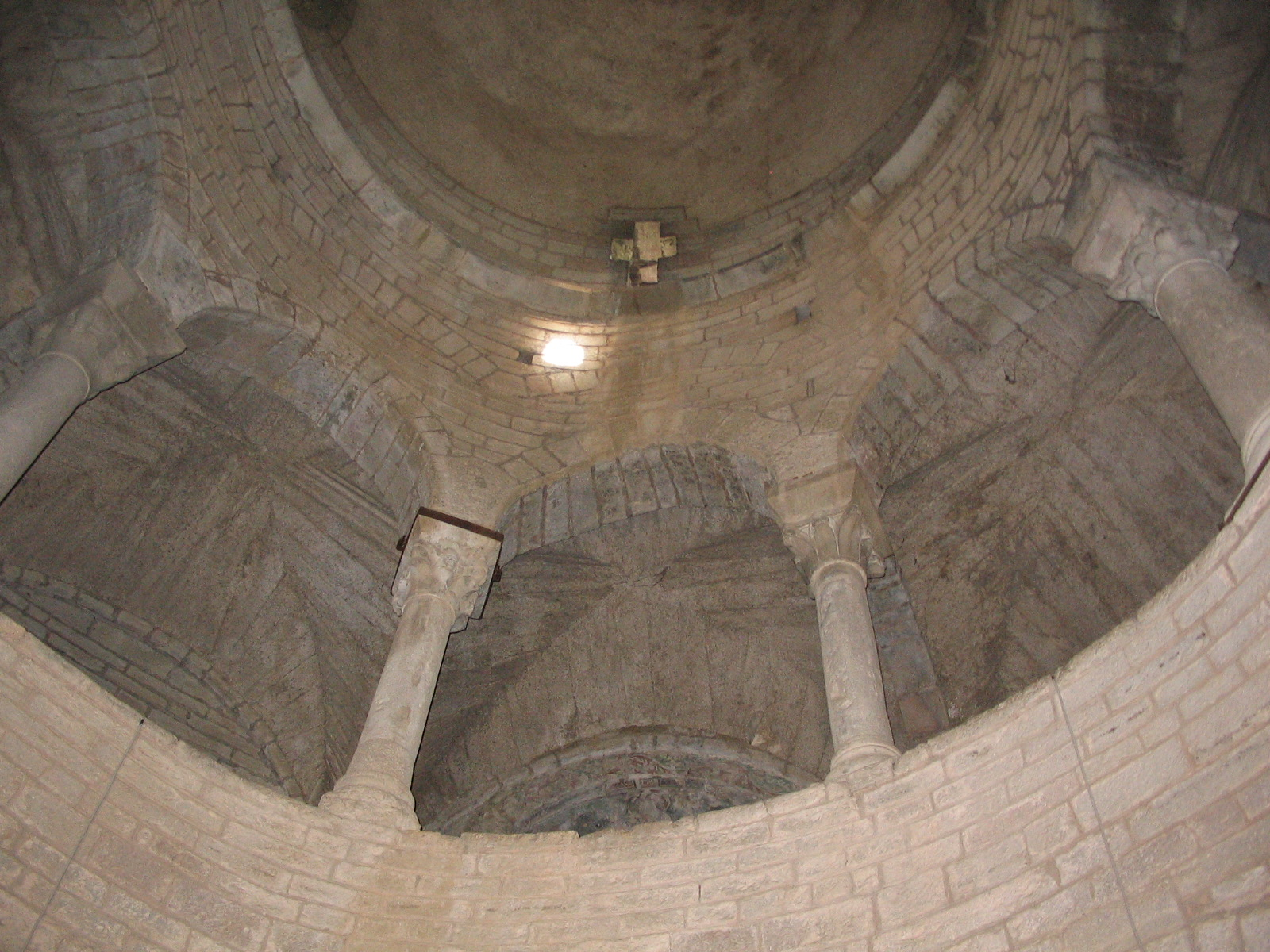
View of the matronaeum.

The Rotonda di San Tomè (Rotunda of St. Thomas) is a church in the comune (municipality) of Almenno San Bartolomeo, in the province of Bergamo, Lombardy, Northern Italy.

The church has a circular plan and is in the Lombard-Romanesque style, dating from the early 12th century, and dedicated to St. Thomas the Apostle.

== History ==
The church was built in the district known in ancient times as Lemine. The date of its construction is uncertain, as well as the existence of other churches on the same site, as it is known a reconstruction was carried on between the end of the 11th and the beginning of the 12th century. It has been speculated it could have been originated in Lombard times (7th-8th centuries), while other scholars assign it to the subsequent Frankish conquest of northern Italy, when the area was under the counts of Lecco.

It has been hypothesised that the Rotonda was built over the remains of a Roman temple, but archaeological investigations have found no sign of this. They have shown that a centrally planned edifice was present here in the 10th century.

This edifice had decayed in such a way that in the early 12th century the bishop of Bergamo decided on its complete reconstruction. Only the foundations and the columns and capitals of the former building were re-used for the ground floor. The columns were extended with reversed capitals at the base or by adding pieces of other columns. Around the end of the 12th century a presbytery and an apse were also built. In the meantime, a monastery was added to the church, with nuns coming especially from the wealthy class of Bergamo. Starting from the 14th century, moral and financial scandals undermined its credibility and inexorably began the decline of the complex, which ceased to exist as an institution in July 1407, when it was suppressed. A farmhouse with barns and stables was built on the remains of the ancient building beginning in the seventeenth century. Today, the building houses the Fondazione Lemine, an organisation which manages the Rotunda of San Tomè and other Romanesque churches in the area such as the Church of San Giorgio in Lemine, Madonna del Castello and Santa Maria della Consolazione.

== Architecture ==
One of the most notable examples of Romanesque architecture in northern Italy, the Rotonda di San Tomè has a central plan with a pyramidal composition, with three cylindrical volumes put one above the other. The second volume constitutes the matronaeum, a women's gallery, and has flat pilasters on its wall. The third volume is the lantern, To the rear of the Rotonda are the rectangular presbytery and semi-circular apse. The whole structure is lit by slit windows and small arched windows.

The interior has eight columns in a circle creating two concentric spaces. The wall enclosing them has niches marked by semi-columns with elegant capitals. Traces of frescoes can still be seen.

The upper matronaeum has also eight columns which creates a circular ambulatory facing the central hollow of the lower section. It has also a small apse with traces of frescoes. The capitals on both floors, and the portal, have well sculpted zoomorphic, human and geometric figures.

San Tomé has different types of capitals. The ground floor has capitals made of material recovery, and some of them are upside down constituting columns’ bases. The first floor's capitals are instead decorated with symbols, figures and stories from the Bible.

The monumentality of the building is enhanced by the play of light that the sun creates: on clear days, the sun's glow penetrates through the building's cross-shaped slits, projecting their image and, on equinox days, the sun's rays penetrate through the lancet window to illuminate the altar.

== Gallery ==
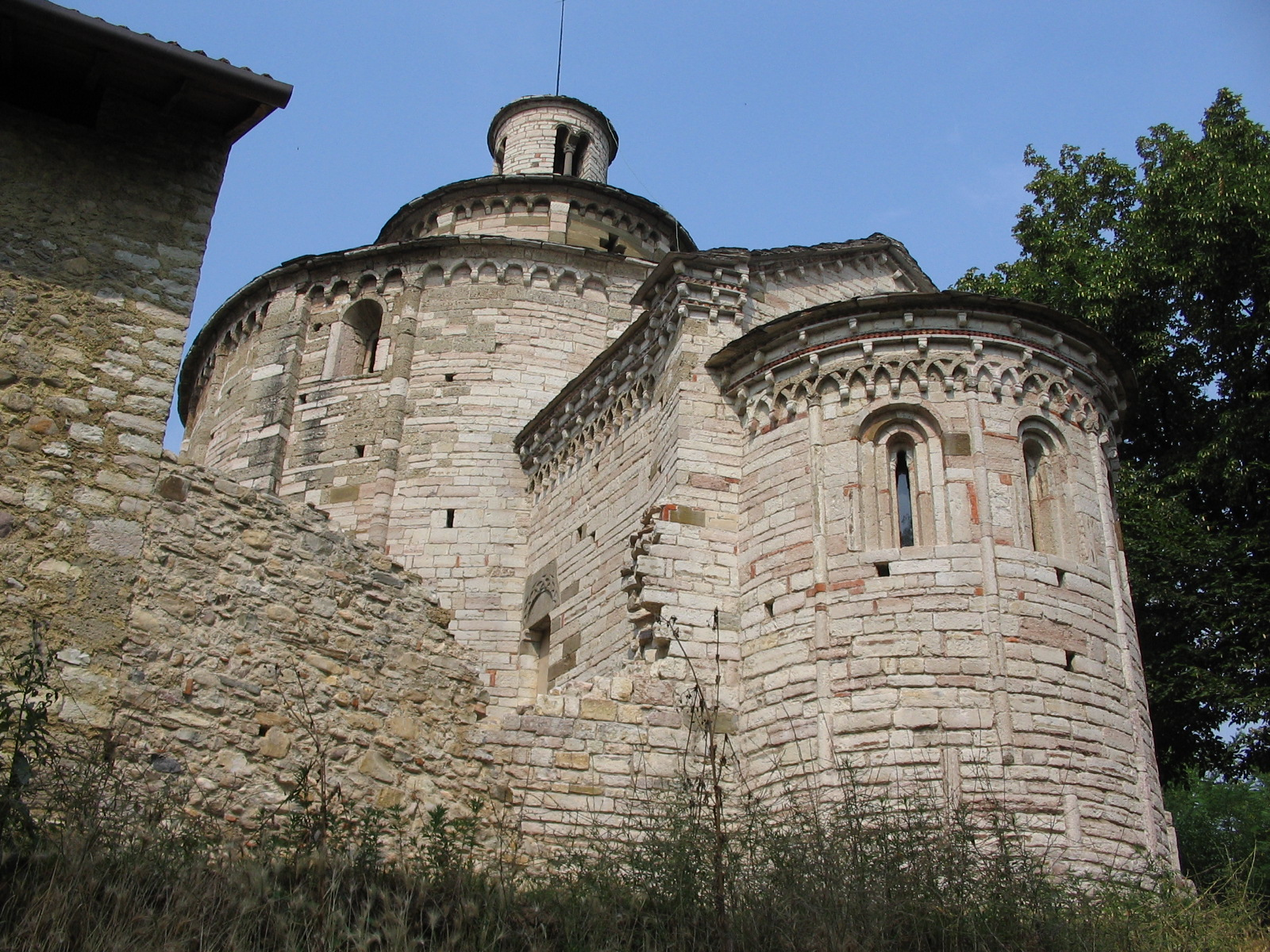
Exterior view of the apse and the presbytery.

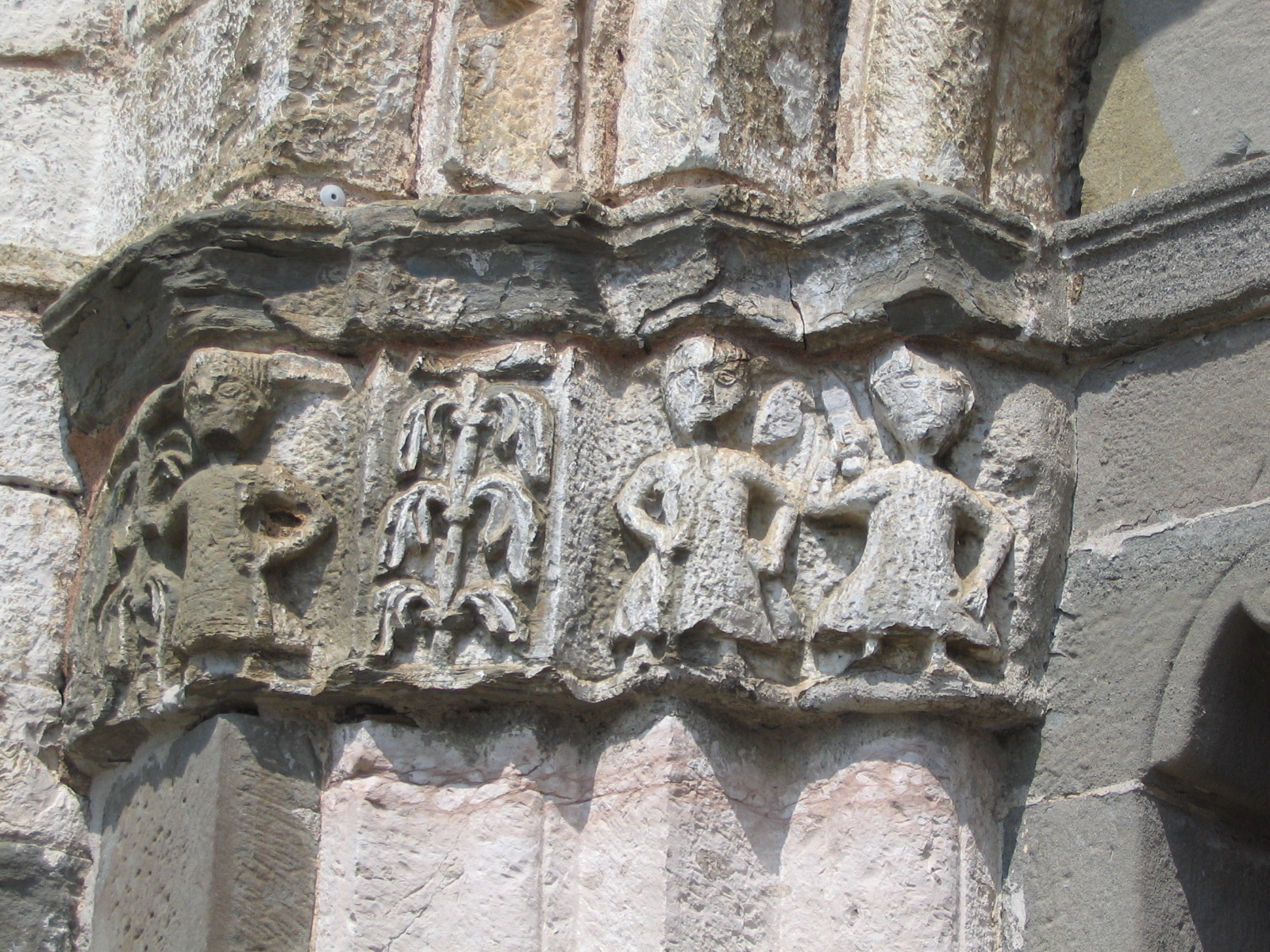
Detail of one of the sculpted capitals of the portal.

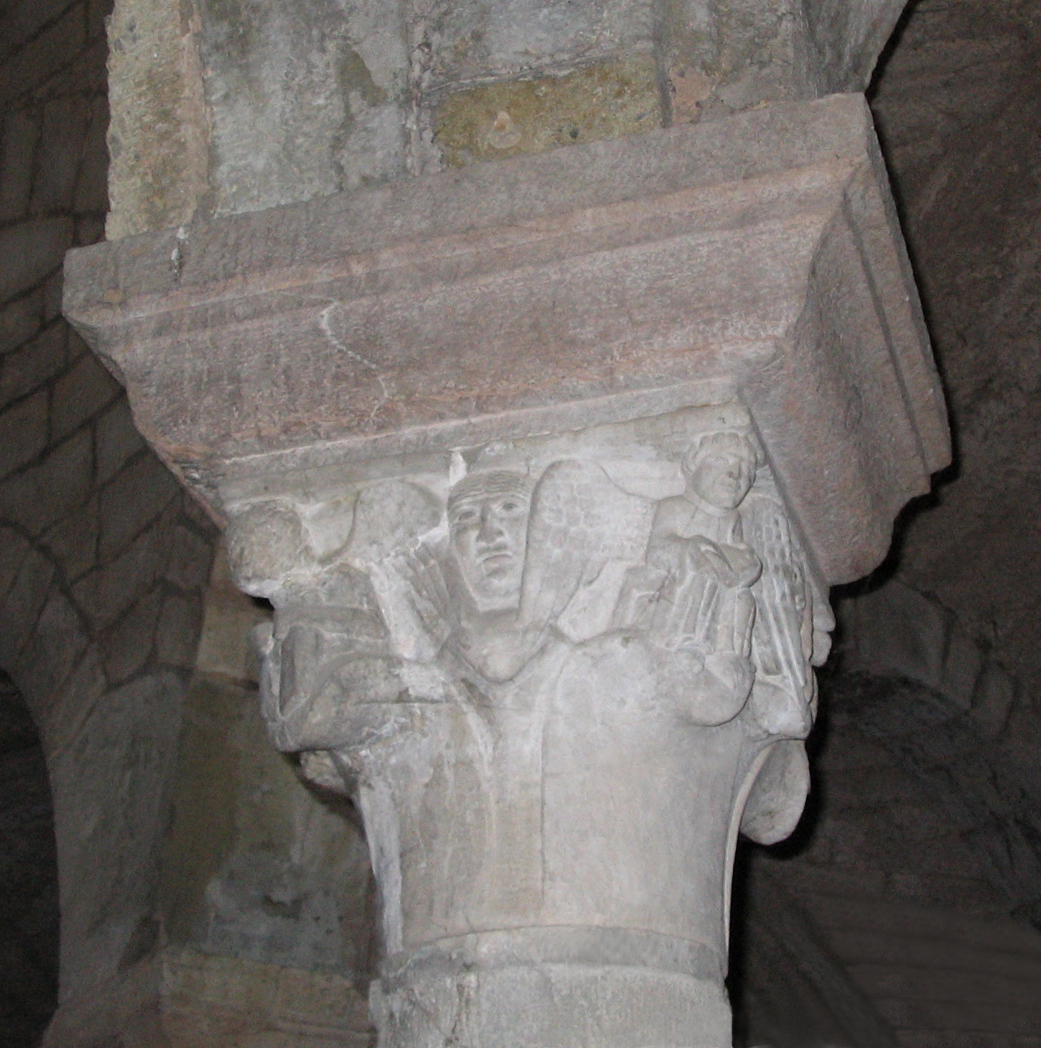
Detail of a capital.

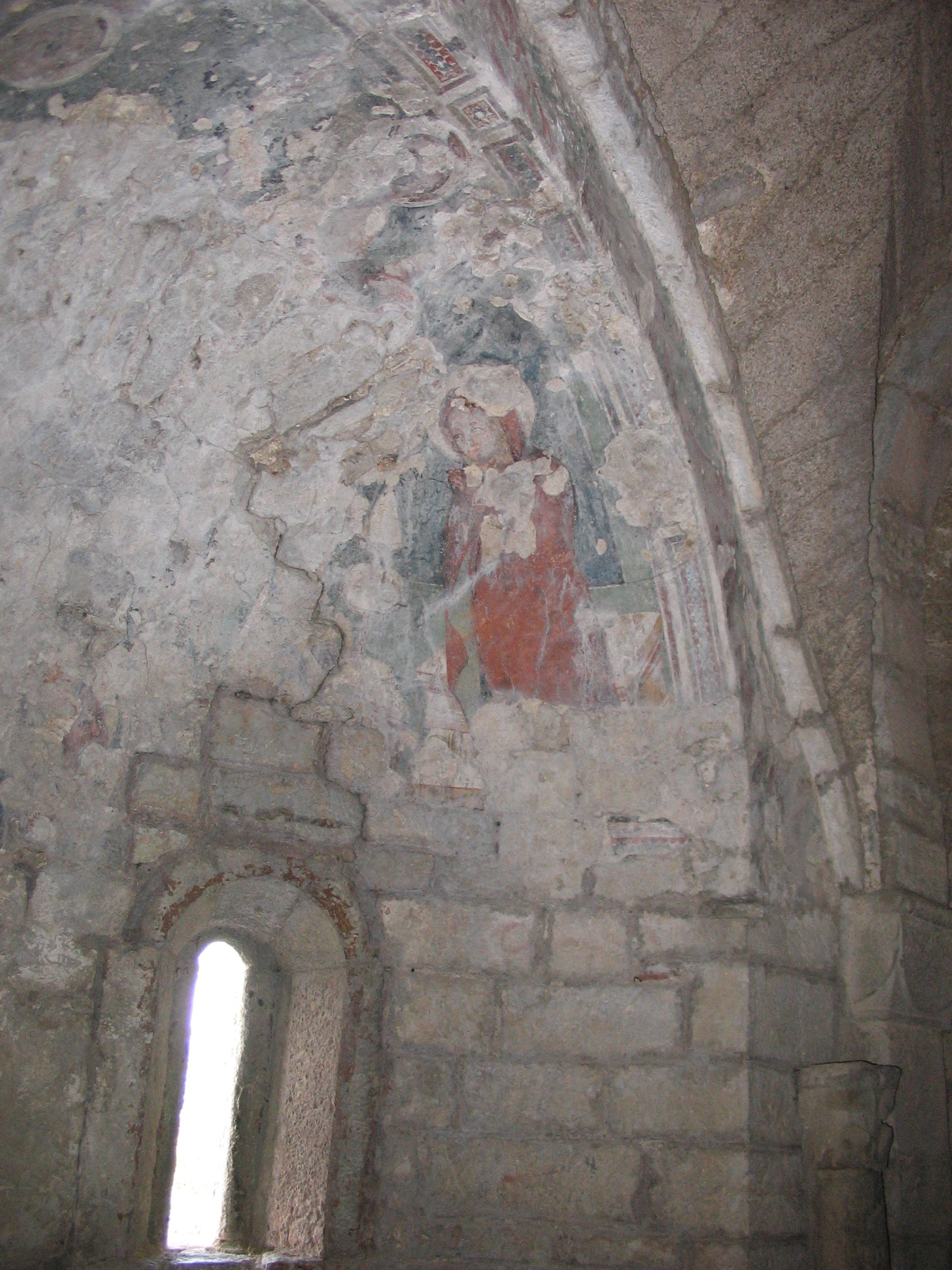
Detail of the apse.

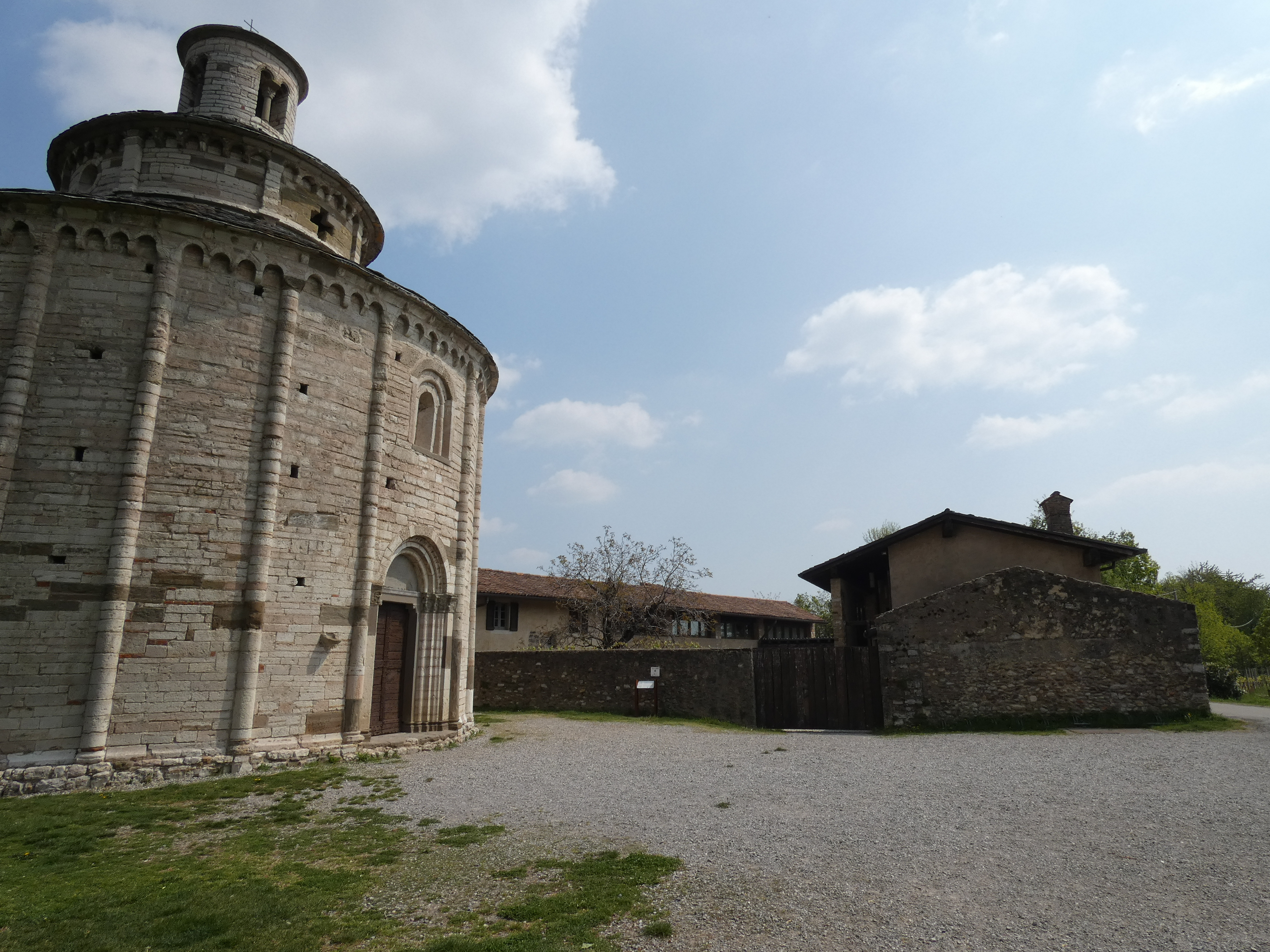
Former monastery

== Itineraries ==
Rotonda di San Tomé is connected with the centre of Almenno San Bartolomeo through a pedestrian and cycling path called Sentiero dell’Agro, which is about 1,5 km long and surrounds the natural zone of Agro di Almenno. Moreover, Rotonda di San Tomé is one of the churches of Percorso del Romanico (Romanico path) of Lemine, including:

- Rotonda di San Tomé and church (building) and convent of Santa Caterina of Tremozia, located in Almenno San Bartolomeo;
- San Giorgio, San Nicola, Madonna del Castello (Sanctuary of Madonna del Castello, Almenno San Salvatore), located in the neighbouring municipality Almenno San Salvatore.

== Events ==
The area of the Rotonda di San Tomé hosts many events and manifestations, including: "Mercato Agricolo e non solo", an agricultural market where you can buy artisan food products and see manual demonstrations of artistic crafts in the courtyard of the former convent; "Spring Festival", with a guided tour of the Romanesque church, games for children and a final concert by the local orchestra and "Antico Lemine", a festival of the Middle Ages and the rural renaissance of Almenno that includes meetings, shows and guided tours in the summer.

== See also ==
- High medieval domes
