= Parina =

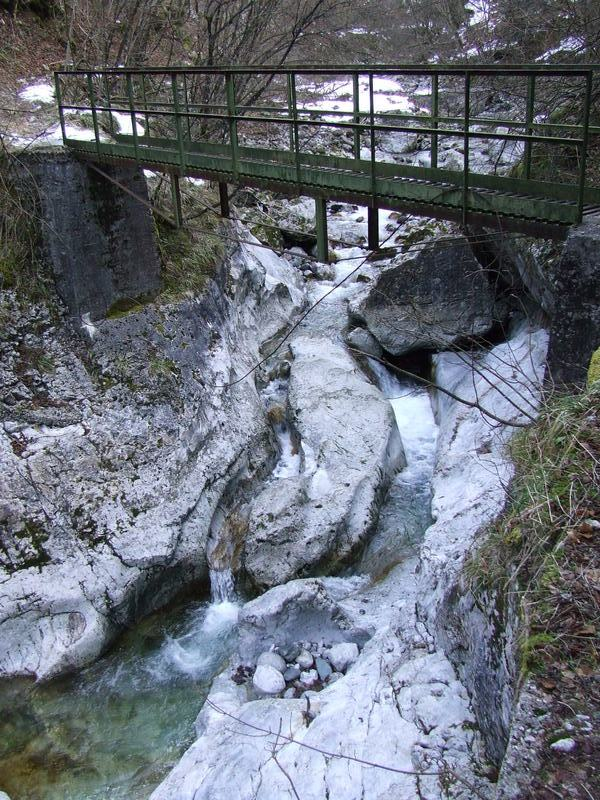

Location
- Country: Italy

Physical characteristics
- Source
  - location: Monte Camplano
  - elevation: 1,723 m (5,653 ft)
- Mouth
  - location: Brembo near Camerata Cornello
  - coordinates: 45.9110°N 9.6669°E
- Length: 16 km (9.9 mi)

Basin features
- Progression: Brembo→ Adda→ Po→ Adriatic Sea

The Parina is a stream in the Bergamo Alps of northern Italy. It begins between the Pizzo Arera and the Cima Valmora, passes near the villages of Oltre il Colle, Serina, Dossena and Lenna, and after 16 kilometres (10 mi) flows into the Brembo river near Camerata Cornello.
