= Almè =

- Comune
- Comune di Almè
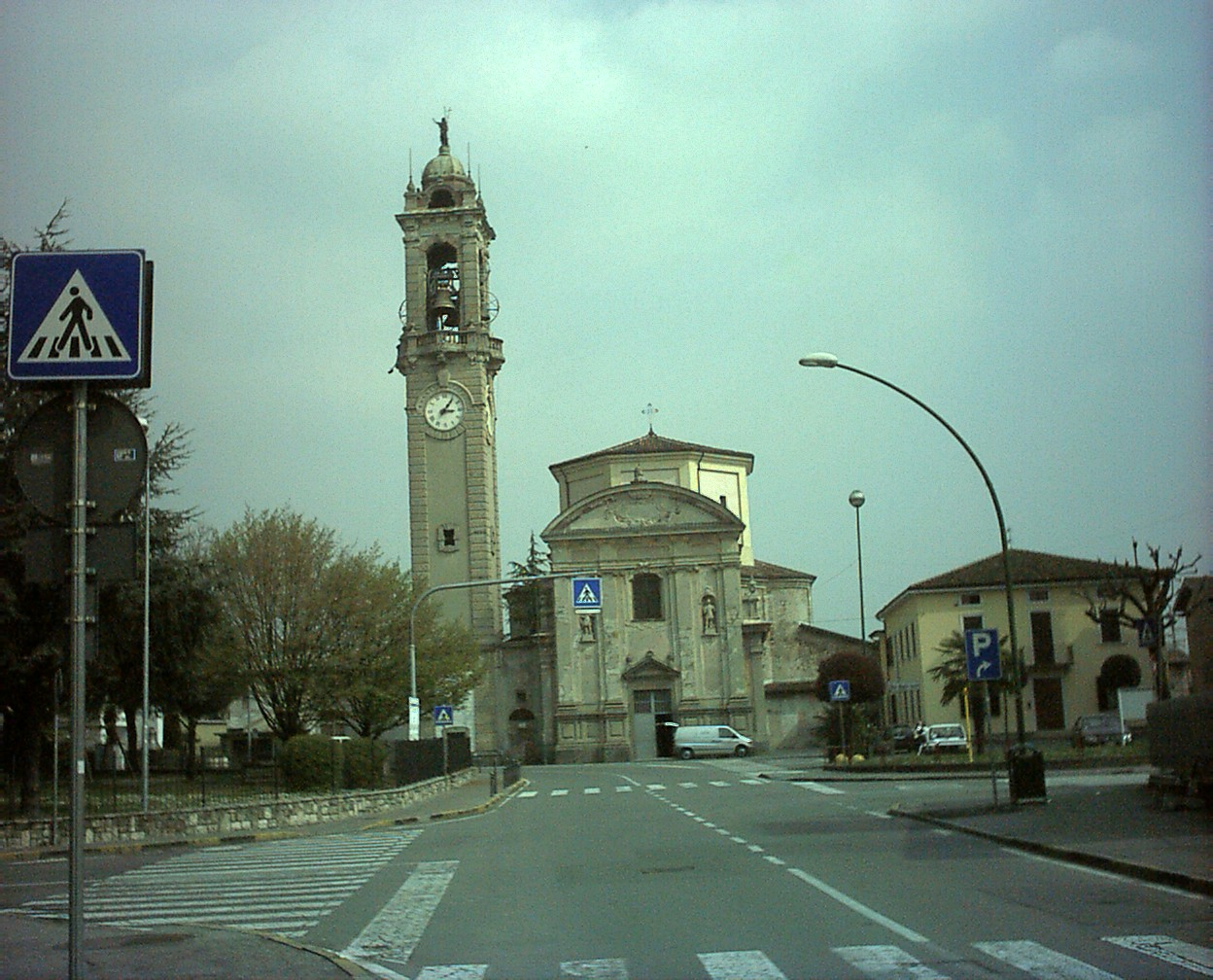
- Old church, Almè

- Coat of arms

- Location of Almè in Italy Almè (Lombardy)
- Coordinates: 45°44′N 9°37′E
- Country: Italy
- Region: Lombardy
- Province: Bergamo (BG)

Government
  - Mayor: Massimo Bandera

Area
  - Total: 2.0 km^{2} (0.77 sq mi)
- Elevation: 294 m (965 ft)

Population (31 May 2021)
  - Total: 5,488
  - Density: 2,700/km^{2} (7,100/sq mi)
- Demonyms: Almesi, Almensi, Lemensi
- Time zone: UTC+1 (CET)
  - Summer (DST): UTC+2 (CEST)
- Postal code: 24011
- Dialing code: 035
- Website: Official website

Almè (Bergamasque: Lmé) is a comune (municipality) in the Province of Bergamo in the Italian region Lombardy, located about 45 kilometres (28 mi) northeast of Milan and about 5 kilometres (3 mi) northwest of Bergamo.

Almè borders the following municipalities: Almenno San Bartolomeo, Almenno San Salvatore, Paladina, Sorisole, Villa d'Almè. Part of Almè's territory is included in the Parco dei Colli di Bergamo, and is crossed by river Quisa.
