= Sorisole =

- Comune
- Comune di Sorisole
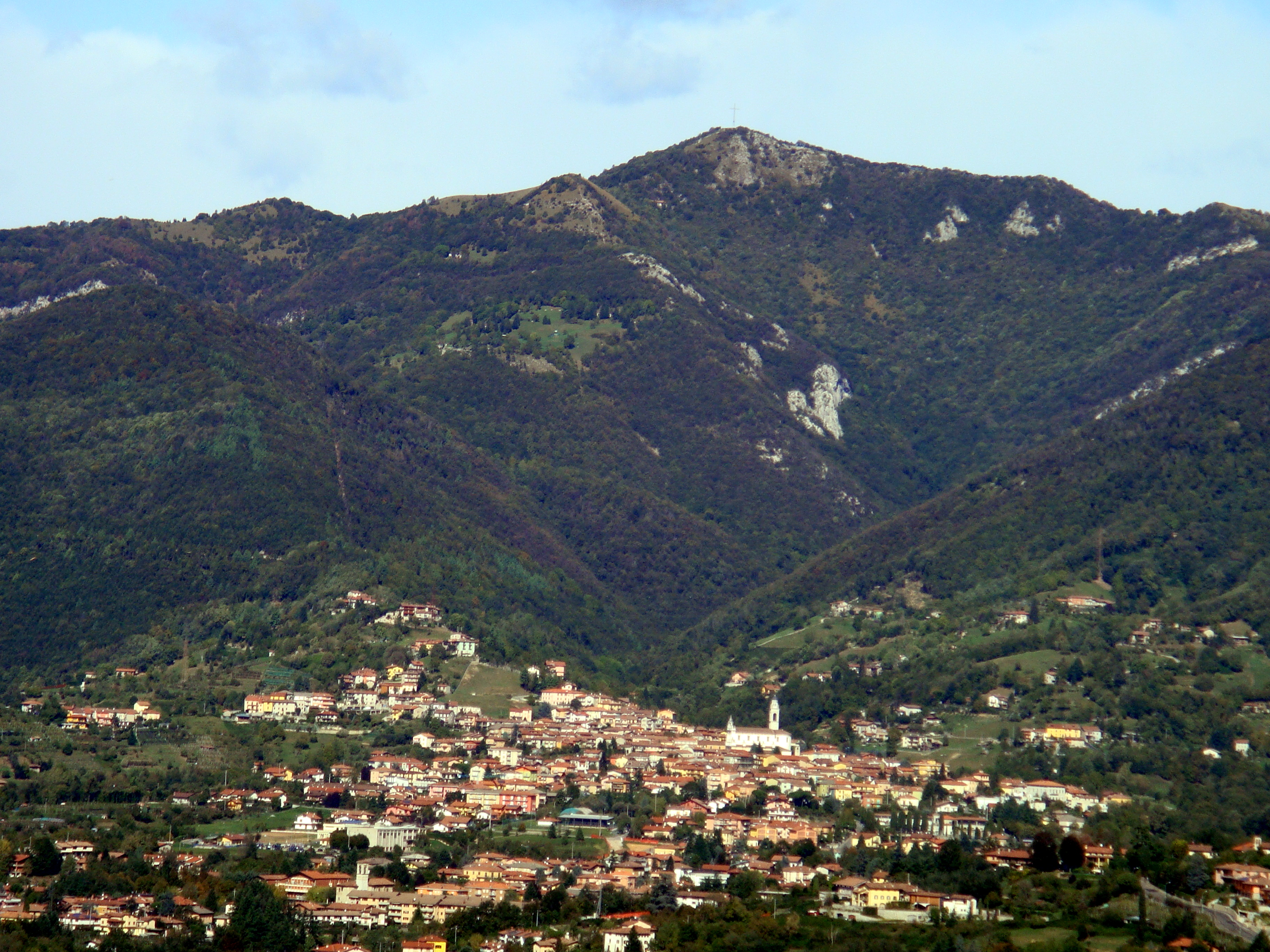
- Sorisole

- Location within Italy Location within Lombardy
- Coordinates: 45°44′N 9°40′E
- Country: Italy
- Region: Lombardy
- Province: Province of Bergamo (BG)
- Frazioni: Petosino, Azzonica

Area
  - Total: 12.3 km^{2} (4.7 sq mi)
- Elevation: 415 m (1,362 ft)

Population (Dec. 2004)
  - Total: 8,507
  - Density: 692/km^{2} (1,790/sq mi)
- Demonym: Sorisolesi
- Time zone: UTC+1 (CET)
  - Summer (DST): UTC+2 (CEST)
- Postal code: 24010
- Dialing code: 035

Sorisole (Bergamasque: Surìsel) is a comune (municipality) in the Province of Bergamo in the Italian region of Lombardy, located about 50 kilometres (31 mi) northeast of Milan and about 4 kilometres (2 mi) north of Bergamo. As of 31 December 2004, it had a population of 8,507 and an area of 12.3 square kilometres (4.7 mi^{2}).

The municipality of Sorisole contains the frazioni (subdivisions, mainly villages and hamlets) Petosino and Azzonica.

Sorisole borders the following municipalities: Almè, Bergamo, Paladina, Ponteranica, Sedrina, Villa d'Almè, Zogno. Part of Sorisole's territory is part of Parco dei Colli di Bergamo and is crossed by river Quisa.

== Demographic evolution ==
Historical population

Year	Pop.	±%
1861	1,705	—
1871	1,773	+4.0%
1881	1,949	+9.9%
1901	2,307	+18.4%
1911	2,724	+18.1%

Year	Pop.	±%
1921	2,977	+9.3%
1931	3,181	+6.9%
1936	3,206	+0.8%
1951	3,991	+24.5%
1961	4,645	+16.4%

Year	Pop.	±%
1971	6,291	+35.4%
1981	7,440	+18.3%
1991	8,120	+9.1%
2001	8,303	+2.3%

Source: Data from ISTAT
