= Quisa =

River in Lombardy, Italy

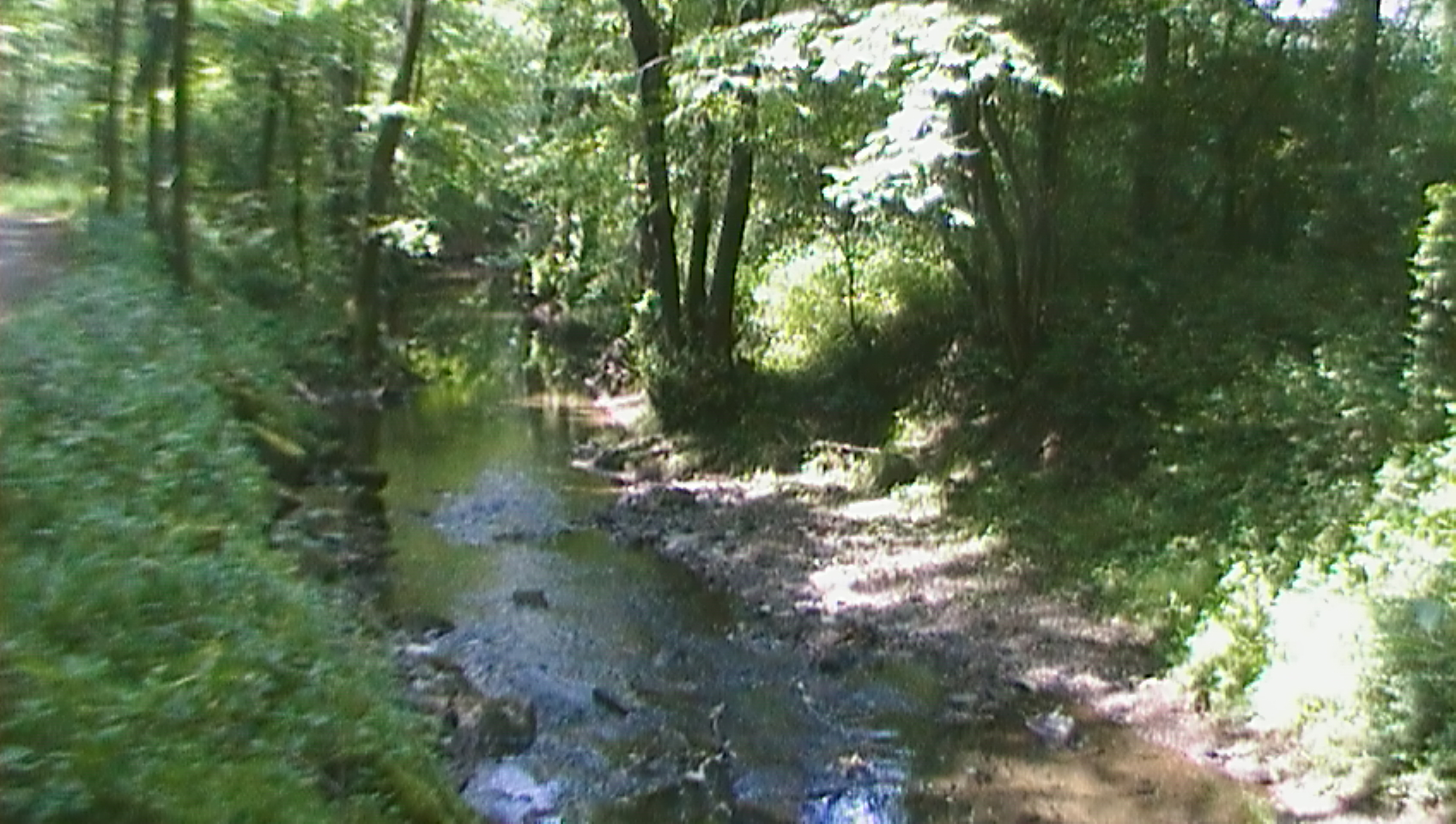
- Quisa in the Parco dei Colli di Bergamo

Location
- Country: Italy

Physical characteristics
- Source
  - location: Canto Alto
- Mouth: Brembo
  - coordinates: 45.6889°N 9.5882°E
- Length: 13 km (8.1 mi)

Basin features
- Progression: Brembo→ Adda→ Po→ Adriatic Sea

Quisa is a 13-kilometre (8 mi) river in the province of Bergamo, Lombardy, northern Italy. Its source is located at the foothill of Canto Alto in the municipality of Sorisole; The river subsequently crosses the municipality of Almè, Paladina, Mozzo and Ponte San Pietro where its waters enter the Brembo.
