= Giovanni Paolo Cavagna =

Italian painter

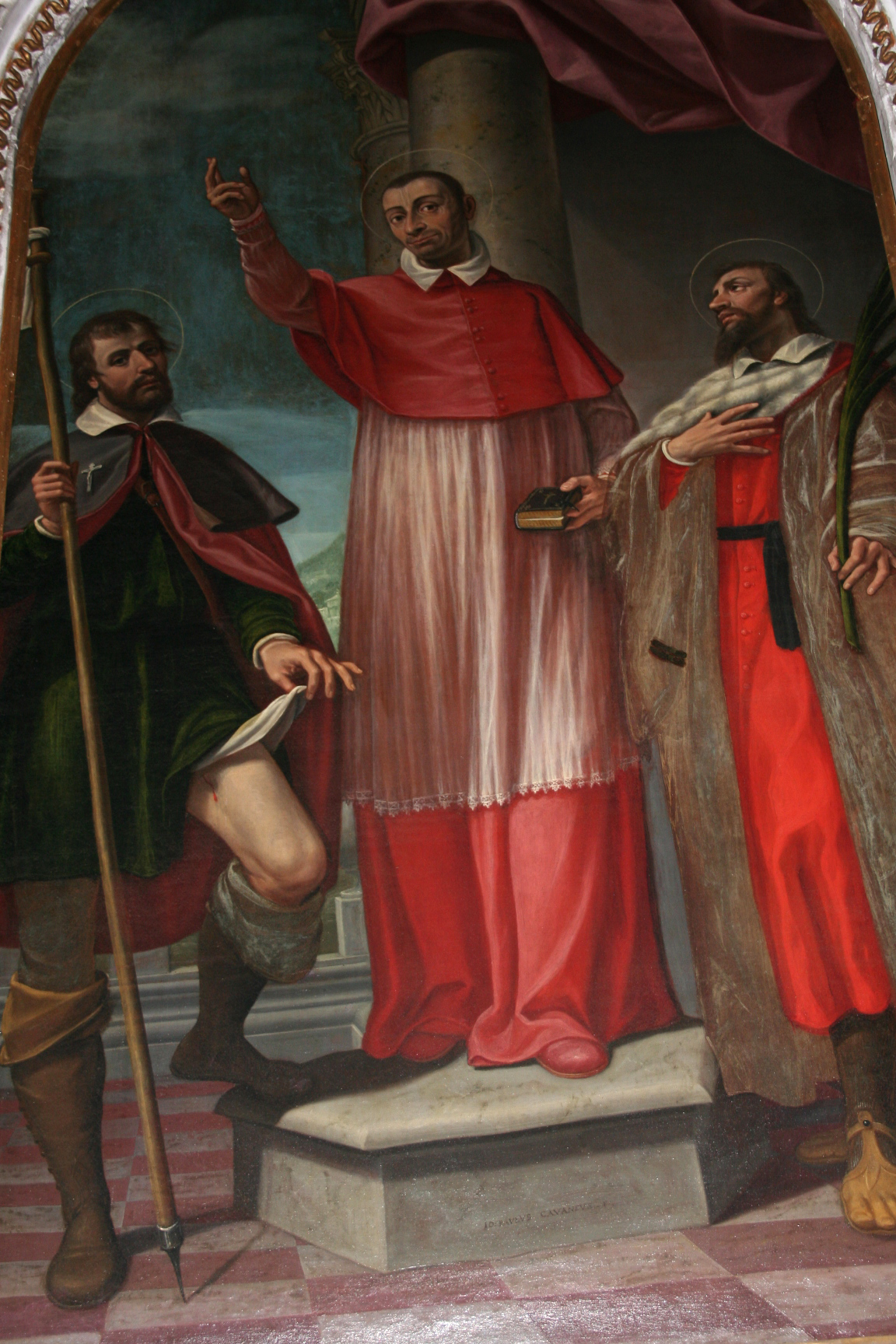
St. Charles Borromeo between St. Roch and St. Pantaleon, Almenno San Salvatore.

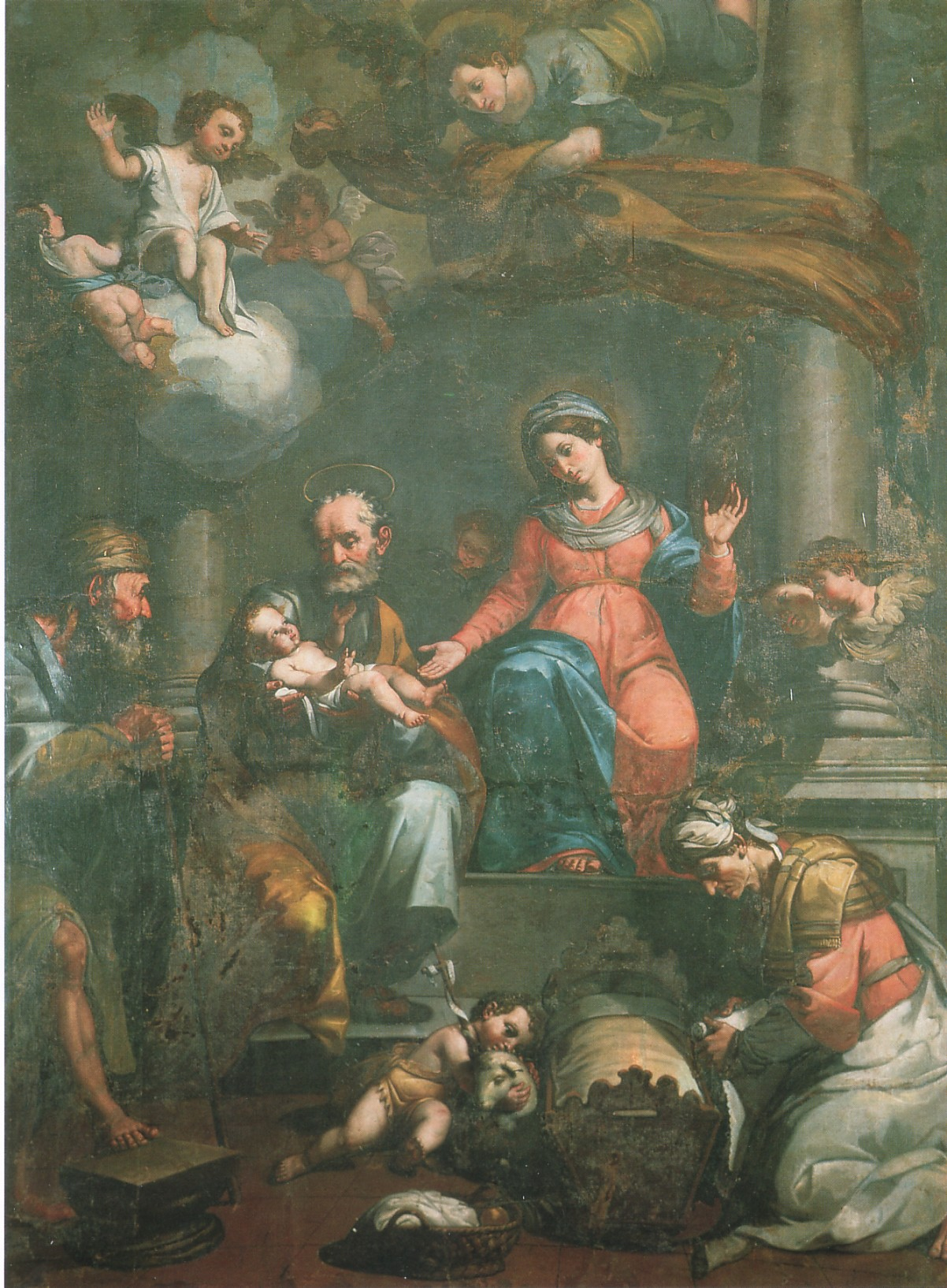
Holy Family.

Giovanni Paolo Cavagna (c. 1550 – May 20, 1627) was an Italian painter of the late-Renaissance period, active mainly in Bergamo and Brescia.

== Biography ==
He was born in Borgo di San Leonardo in Bergamo. He is said to have trained in Venice with the studio of an elder Titian, then became a pupil of Giovanni Battista Moroni in Bergamo. Other sources list Cristoforo Baschenis the elder as his tutor. He may have painted in the style of the master's above. His son Francesco, called Cavagnuola, was also a painter. He painted the Assumption of the Virgin, the Nativity, Esther and Ahasuerus for the church of Santa Maria Maggiore in Bergamo.

He also painted the Santa Lucia, the Crucifixion with Saints for the church of Santo Spirito. He painted a Coronation of the Virgin for San Giovanni Battista in Casnigo. He completed some paintings for the Sanctuary of the Madonna del Castello located in Almenno San Salvatore, in the province of Bergamo. He painted a Crucifixion for Santa Lucia in Venice.
