= Villa d'Almè =

- Comune
- Comune di Villa d'Almè
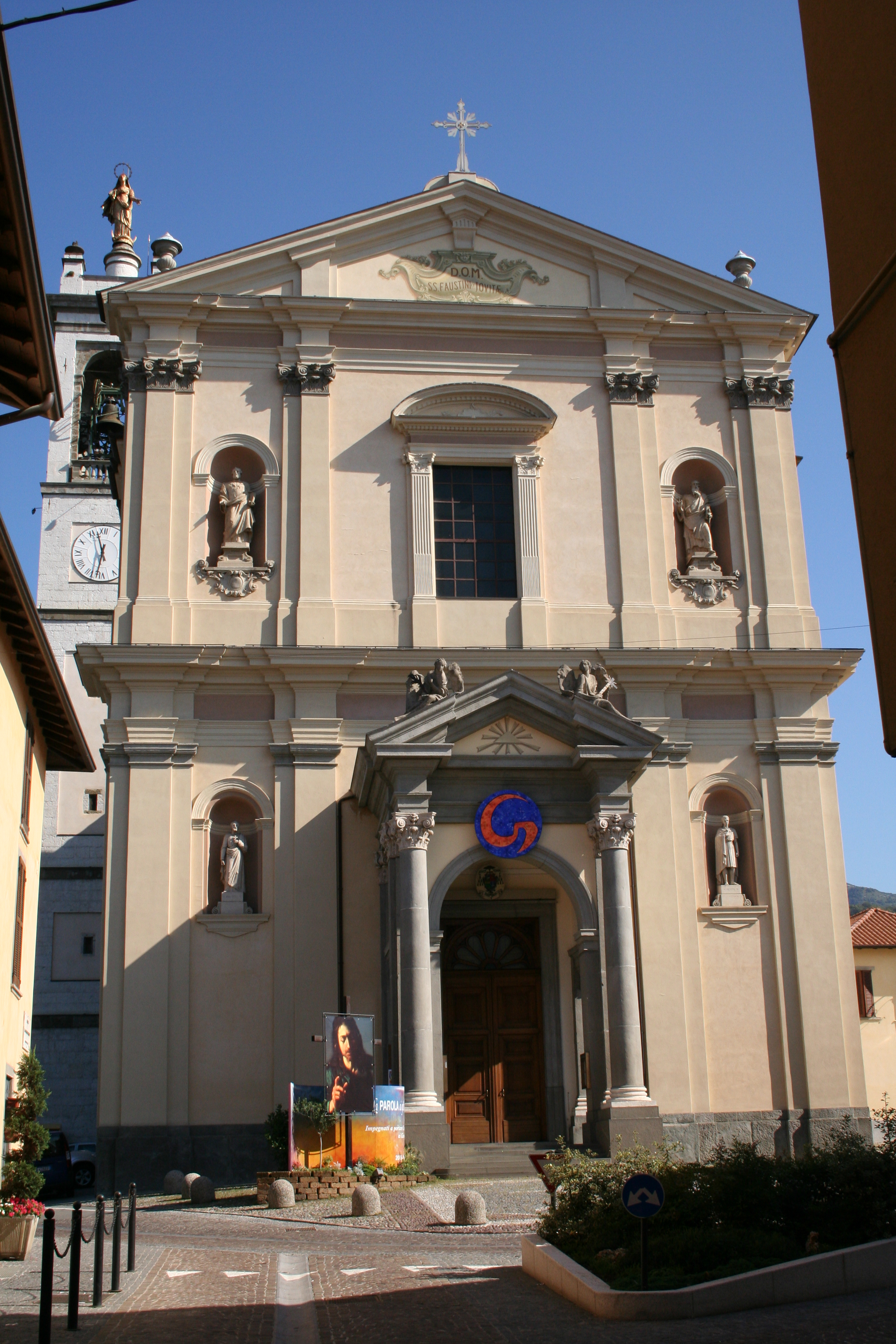
- Church

- Location within Italy Location within Lombardy
- Coordinates: 45°45′N 9°37′E
- Country: Italy
- Region: Lombardy
- Province: Bergamo (BG)
- Frazioni: Bruntino, Campana

Government
  - Mayor: Giuseppin Pigolotti

Area
  - Total: 6.4 km^{2} (2.5 sq mi)
- Elevation: 300 m (980 ft)

Population (31 December 2010)
  - Total: 6,844
  - Density: 1,100/km^{2} (2,800/sq mi)
- Demonym: Villesi
- Time zone: UTC+1 (CET)
  - Summer (DST): UTC+2 (CEST)
- Postal code: 24018
- Dialing code: 035
- Website: Official website

Villa d'Almè (Bergamasque: Éla d'Almè) is a comune (municipality) in the Province of Bergamo in the Italian region of Lombardy, located about 45 kilometres (28 mi) northeast of Milan and about 7 kilometres (4 mi) northwest of Bergamo.

Villa d'Almè borders the following municipalities: Almè, Almenno San Salvatore, Sedrina, Sorisole, Ubiale Clanezzo. Part of Villa d'Almè's territory is included in the Parco dei Colli di Bergamo.
