= Paladina =

- Comune
- Comune di Paladina
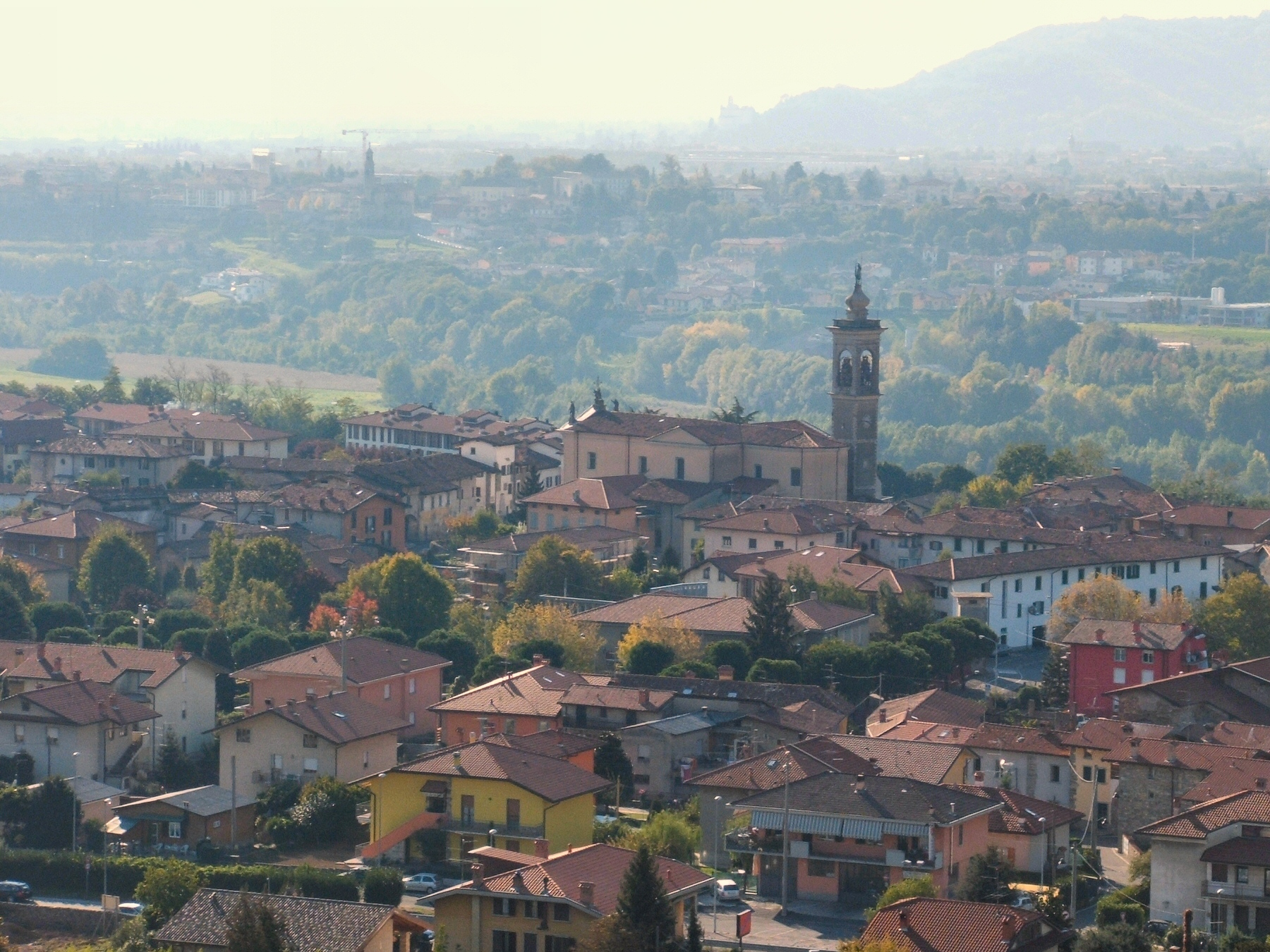
- Paladina

- Coat of arms

- Location within Italy Location within Lombardy
- Coordinates: 45°44′N 9°37′E
- Country: Italy
- Region: Lombardy
- Province: Bergamo (BG)
- Frazioni: Sombreno

Government
  - Mayor: Gianmaria Brignoli

Area
  - Total: 2.0 km^{2} (0.77 sq mi)
- Elevation: 272 m (892 ft)

Population (31 August 2021)
  - Total: 4,000
  - Density: 2,000/km^{2} (5,200/sq mi)
- Demonym: Paladinesi
- Time zone: UTC+1 (CET)
  - Summer (DST): UTC+2 (CEST)
- Postal code: 24030
- Dialing code: 035

Paladina is a comune (municipality) in the Province of Bergamo in the Italian region of Lombardy, located about 45 kilometres (28 mi) northeast of Milan and about 5 kilometres (3 mi) northwest of Bergamo.

Paladina borders the following municipalities: Almè, Almenno San Bartolomeo, Almenno San Salvatore, Bergamo, Sorisole, Valbrembo. Part of Paladina's territory is included in Parco dei Colli di Bergamo and is crossed by river Quisa.

== People ==
- Elena Cattaneo, 1962, Italian academic and life senator.
