= Stabina =

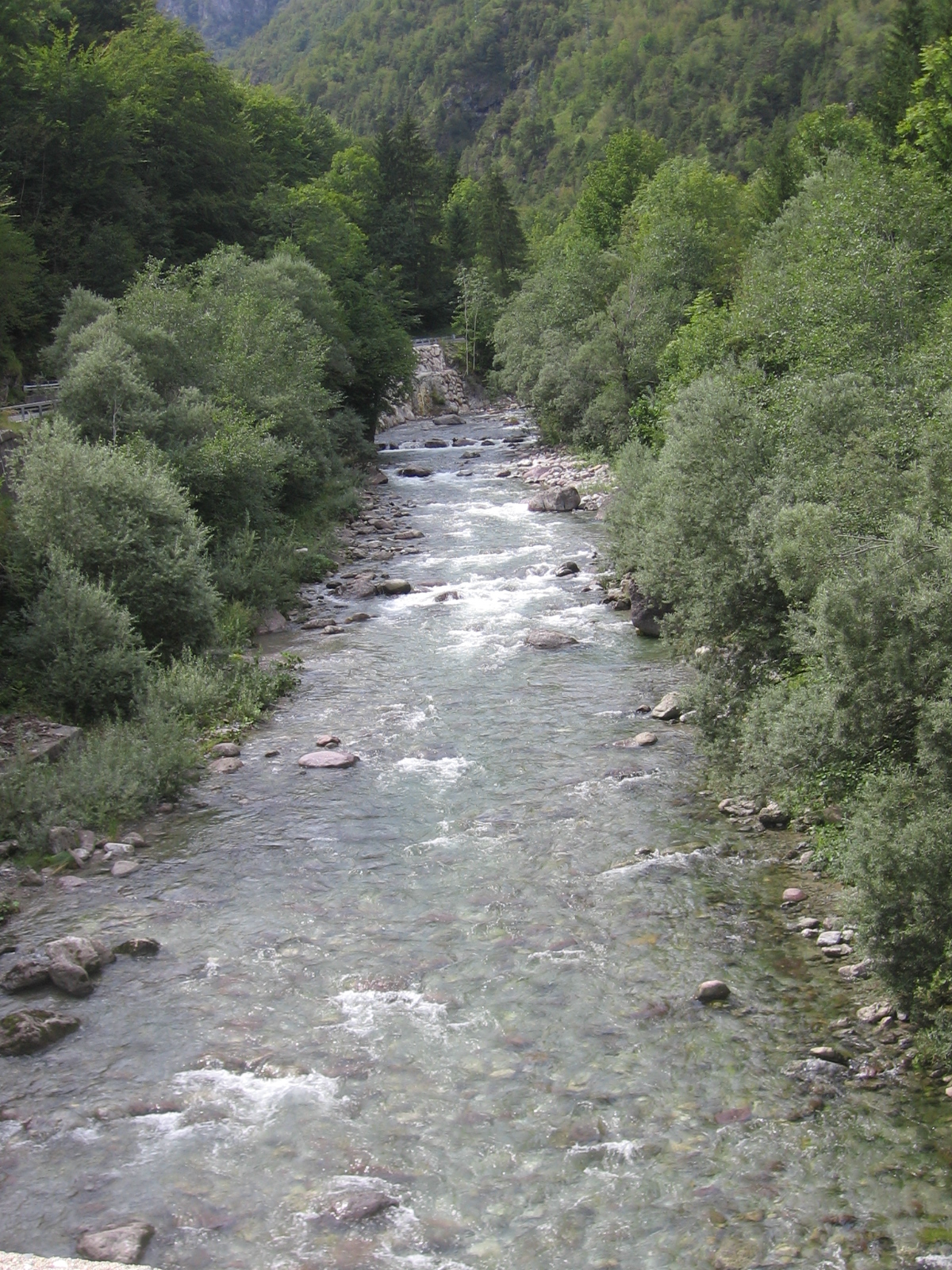

Location
- Country: Italy

Physical characteristics
- Mouth: Brembo
  - coordinates: 45.9660°N 9.6486°E

Basin features
- Progression: Brembo→ Adda→ Po→ Adriatic Sea

The Stabina is a stream in the Bergamo Alps of northern Italy. It begins at the Pizzo Tre Signori, and after 9 kilometres (6 mi), it flows into the river Brembo near the village of Olmo al Brembo.
