= Sedrina =

Comune in Lombardy, Italy

- Comune
- Comune di Sedrina
- Location within Italy Location within Lombardy
- Coordinates: 45°47′N 9°37′E
- Country: Italy
- Region: Lombardy
- Province: Province of Bergamo (BG)

Area
  - Total: 6.0 km^{2} (2.3 sq mi)
- Elevation: 328 m (1,076 ft)

Population (Dec. 2010)
  - Total: 2,559
  - Density: 430/km^{2} (1,100/sq mi)
- Demonym: Sedrinesi
- Time zone: UTC+1 (CET)
  - Summer (DST): UTC+2 (CEST)
- Postal code: 24010
- Dialing code: 0345

Sedrina is a comune (municipality) in the Province of Bergamo in the Italian region of Lombardy, located about 50 kilometres (31 mi) northeast of Milan and about 10 kilometres (6 mi) northwest of Bergamo. As of 31 December 2010, it had a population of 2,559 and an area of 6.0 square kilometres (2.3 mi^{2}).

Sedrina borders the following municipalities: Brembilla, Sorisole, Ubiale Clanezzo, Villa d'Almè, Zogno.

Sedrina is the birthplace of Felice Gimondi.

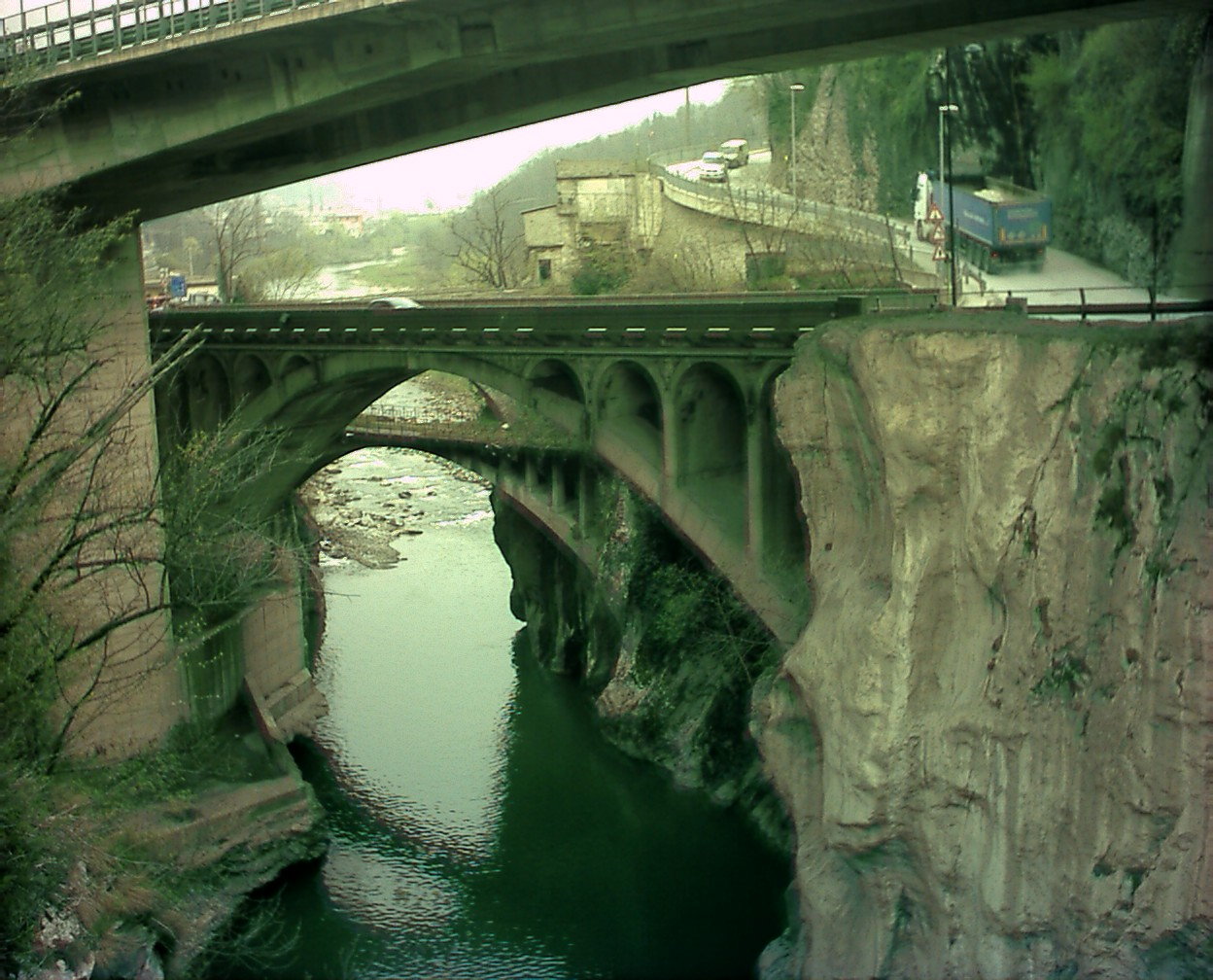
Sedrina bridges

== Demographic evolution ==
Historical population

Year	Pop.	±%
1861	994	—
1871	1,074	+8.0%
1881	1,171	+9.0%
1901	1,412	+20.6%
1911	1,693	+19.9%

Year	Pop.	±%
1921	1,926	+13.8%
1931	2,002	+3.9%
1936	1,799	−10.1%
1951	2,194	+22.0%
1961	2,168	−1.2%

Year	Pop.	±%
1971	2,214	+2.1%
1981	2,375	+7.3%
1991	2,410	+1.5%
2001	2,380	−1.2%
2011	2,507	+5.3%

Source: Data from ISTAT
