= Cima Valmora =

Mountain in Italy

Coordinates: 45°55′52″N 9°50′32″E

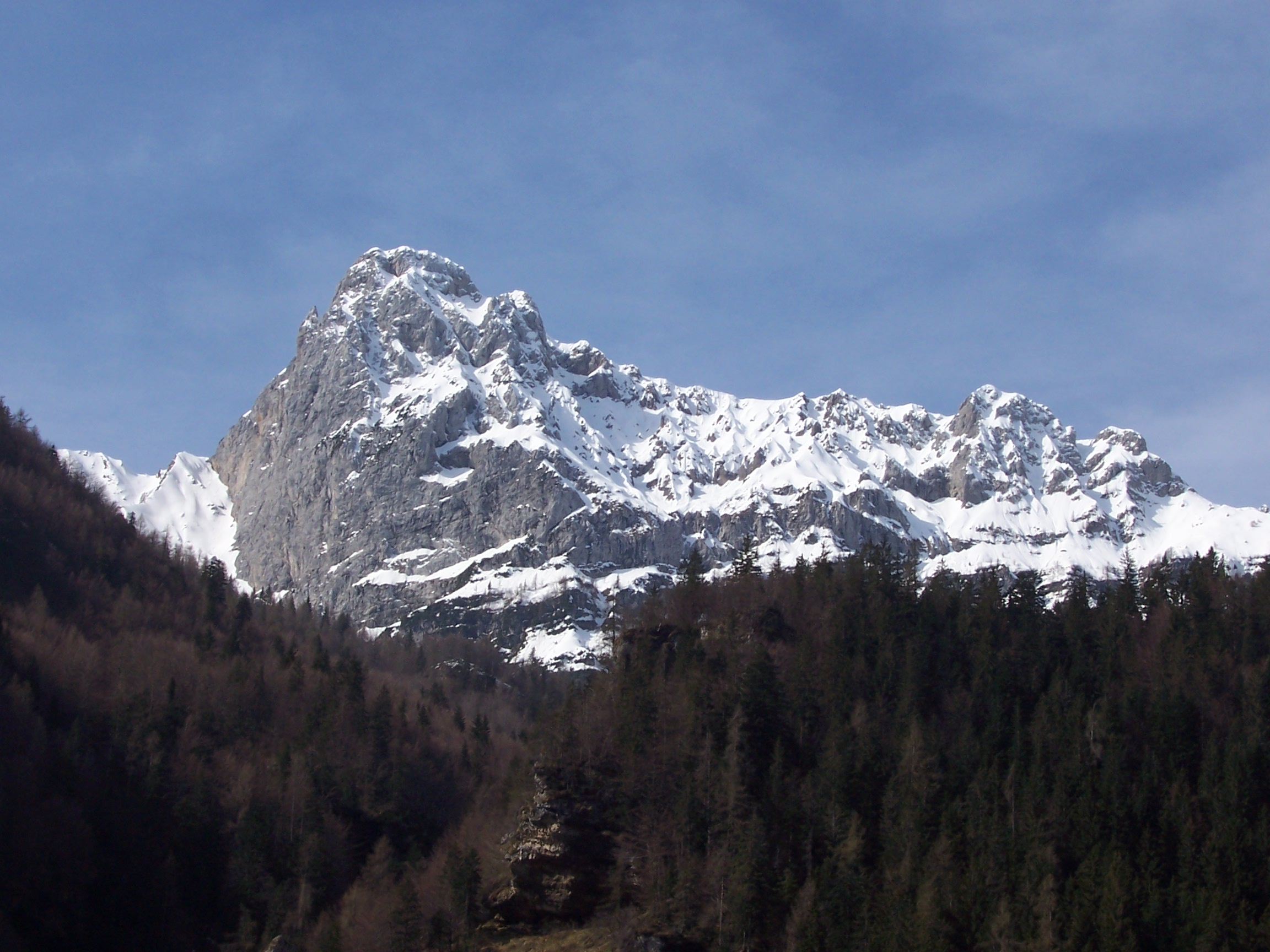
- Cima Valmora seen from Valcanale

Highest point
- Elevation: 2,198 m (7,211 ft)

Geography
- Location: Lombardy, Italy
- Parent range: Bergamo Alps

Cima Valmora is a mountain of Lombardy, Italy. It is located within the Bergamo Alps. The mountain has an elevation of 2,198 metres.
