= Almenno San Salvatore =

- Comune
- Comune di Almenno San Salvatore
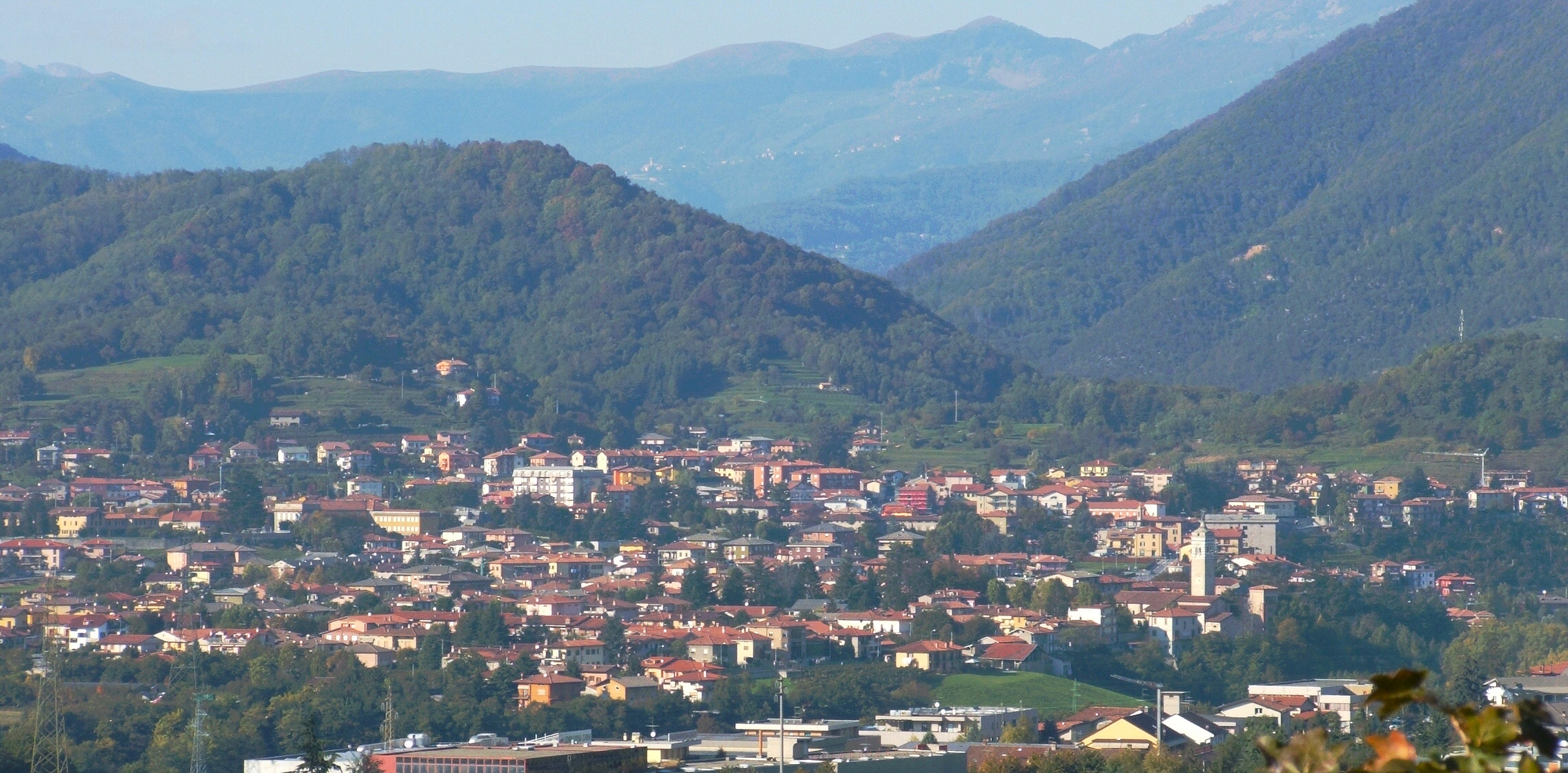
- View of Almenno San Salvatore

- Coat of arms

- Location of Almenno San Salvatore in Italy Almenno San Salvatore (Lombardy)
- Coordinates: 45°45′N 9°35′E
- Country: Italy
- Region: Lombardy
- Province: Bergamo (BG)

Government
  - Mayor: Michele Sarchielli (Lega Nord)

Area
  - Total: 4.73 km^{2} (1.83 sq mi)
- Elevation: 328 m (1,076 ft)

Population (31 May 2021)
  - Total: 5,573
  - Density: 1,180/km^{2} (3,050/sq mi)
- Demonym: Almennesi
- Time zone: UTC+1 (CET)
  - Summer (DST): UTC+2 (CEST)
- Postal code: 24031
- Dialing code: 035
- Website: Official website

Almenno San Salvatore (Bergamasque: Almèn San Salvadùr or simply Almèn) is a comune (municipality) in the Province of Bergamo in the Italian region Lombardy, located about 45 kilometres (28 mi) northeast of Milan and about 9 kilometres (6 mi) northwest of Bergamo.

Almenno San Salvatore borders the following municipalities: Almè, Almenno San Bartolomeo, Paladina, Strozza, Ubiale Clanezzo, Villa d'Almè.

Sights include the Santuario della Madonna del Castello, with paintings by Andrea Previtali and Gian Paolo Cavagna, the annexed the Pieve di Lemine, with 10th-century frescoes, and the Romanesque church of San Giorgio. The Rotonda di San Tomè is also located nearby.
