= Canto Alto =

Mountain in Italy

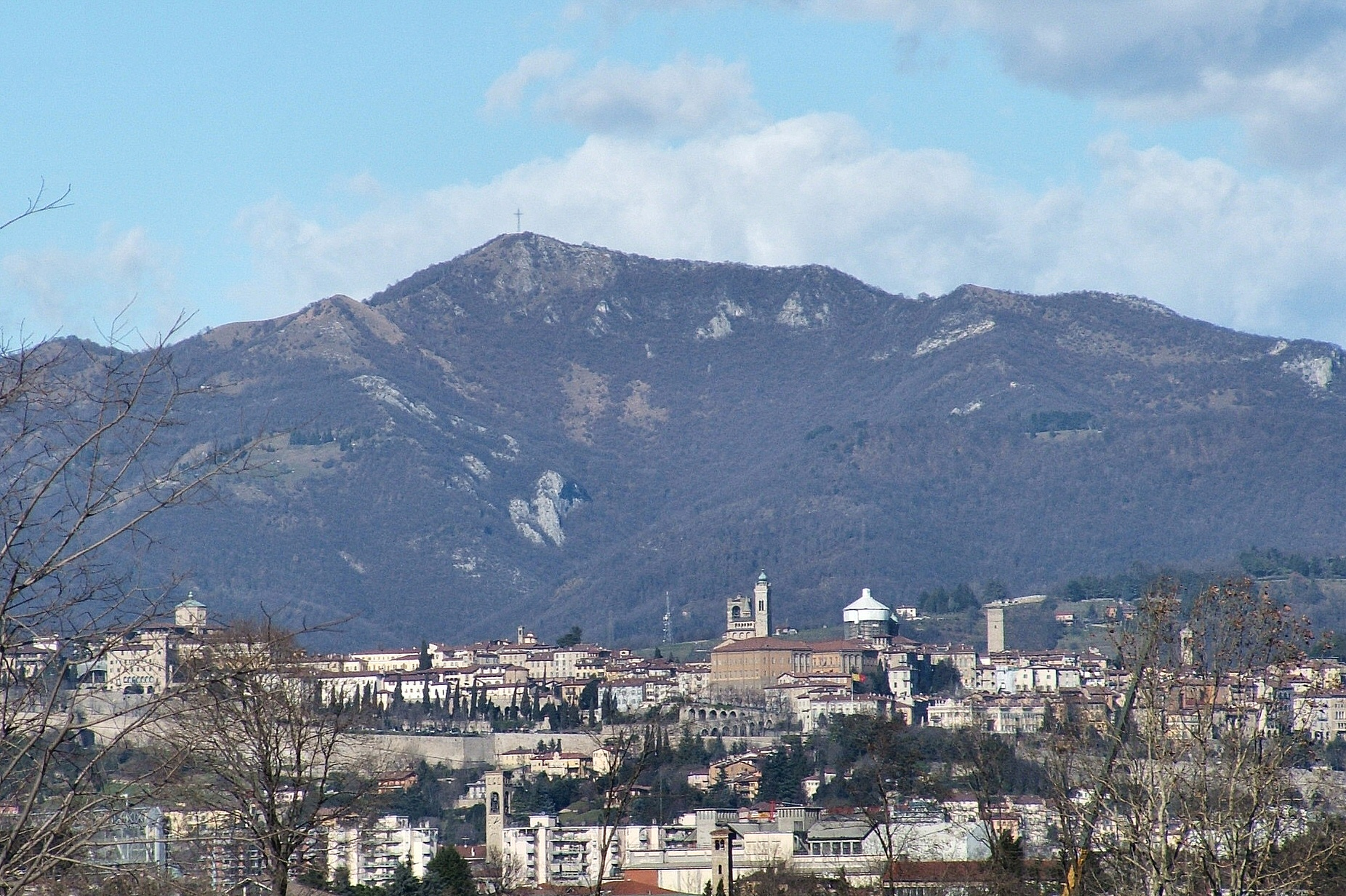
- The Canto Alto in the background of Bergamo

Highest point
- Elevation: 1,146 m (3,760 ft)
- Coordinates: 45°46′N 9°40′E

Geography
- Location: Lombardy, Italy
- Parent range: Bergamo Alps

Canto Alto is a mountain of Lombardy, Italy. It is located within the Bergamo Alps.
