= Sanctuary of Madonna del Castello, Almenno San Salvatore =

Church in Almenno San Salvatore, Italy

Sanctuary of Madonna del Castello
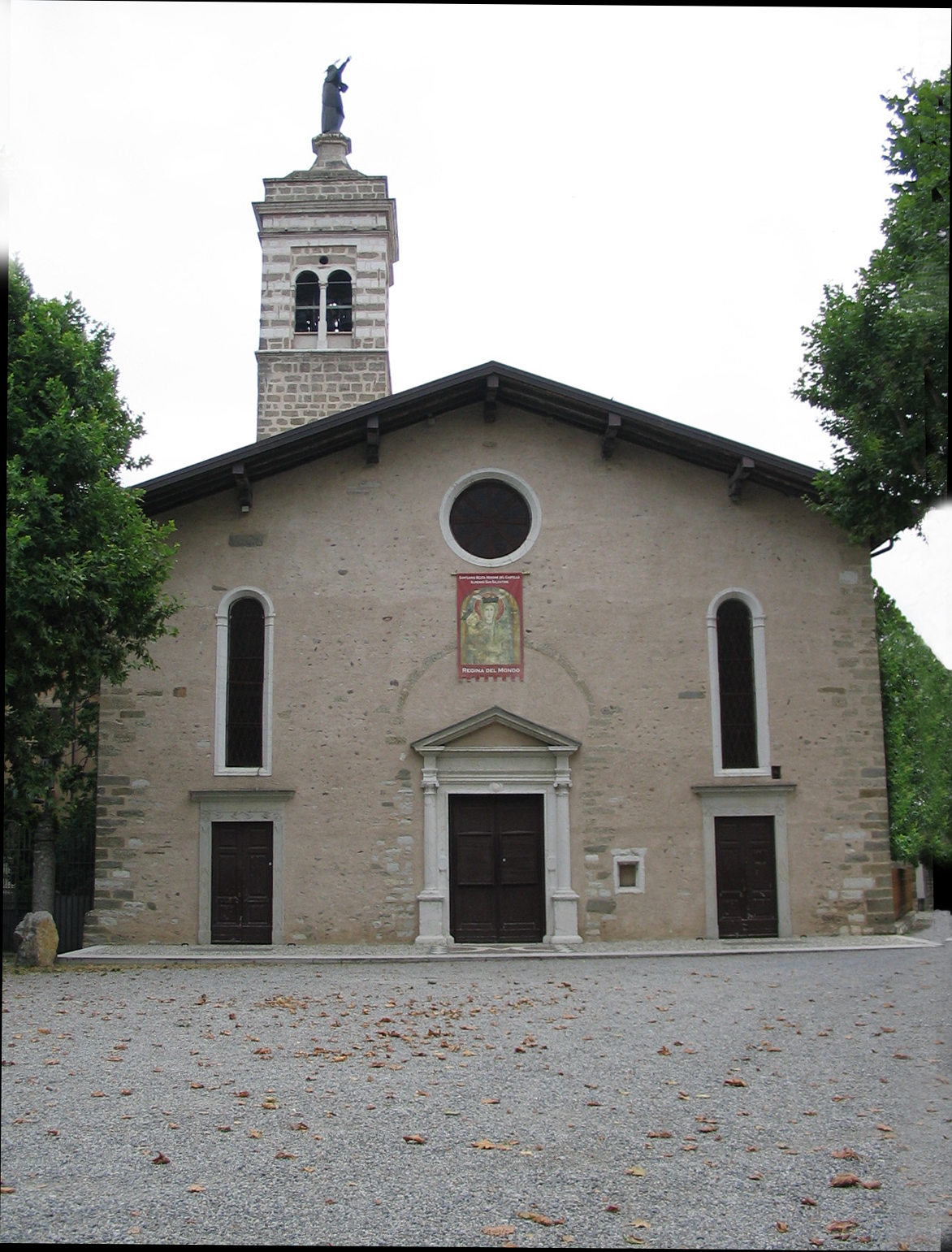
- Façade of the church.

Religion
- Affiliation: Roman Catholic
- Province: Bergamo
- Ecclesiastical or organisational status: National monument
- Status: Active

Location
- Location: Almenno San Salvatore, Italy
- Interactive map of Sanctuary of Madonna del Castello
- Coordinates: 45.746475°N 9.603514°E

Architecture
- Type: Church
- Style: Romanesque

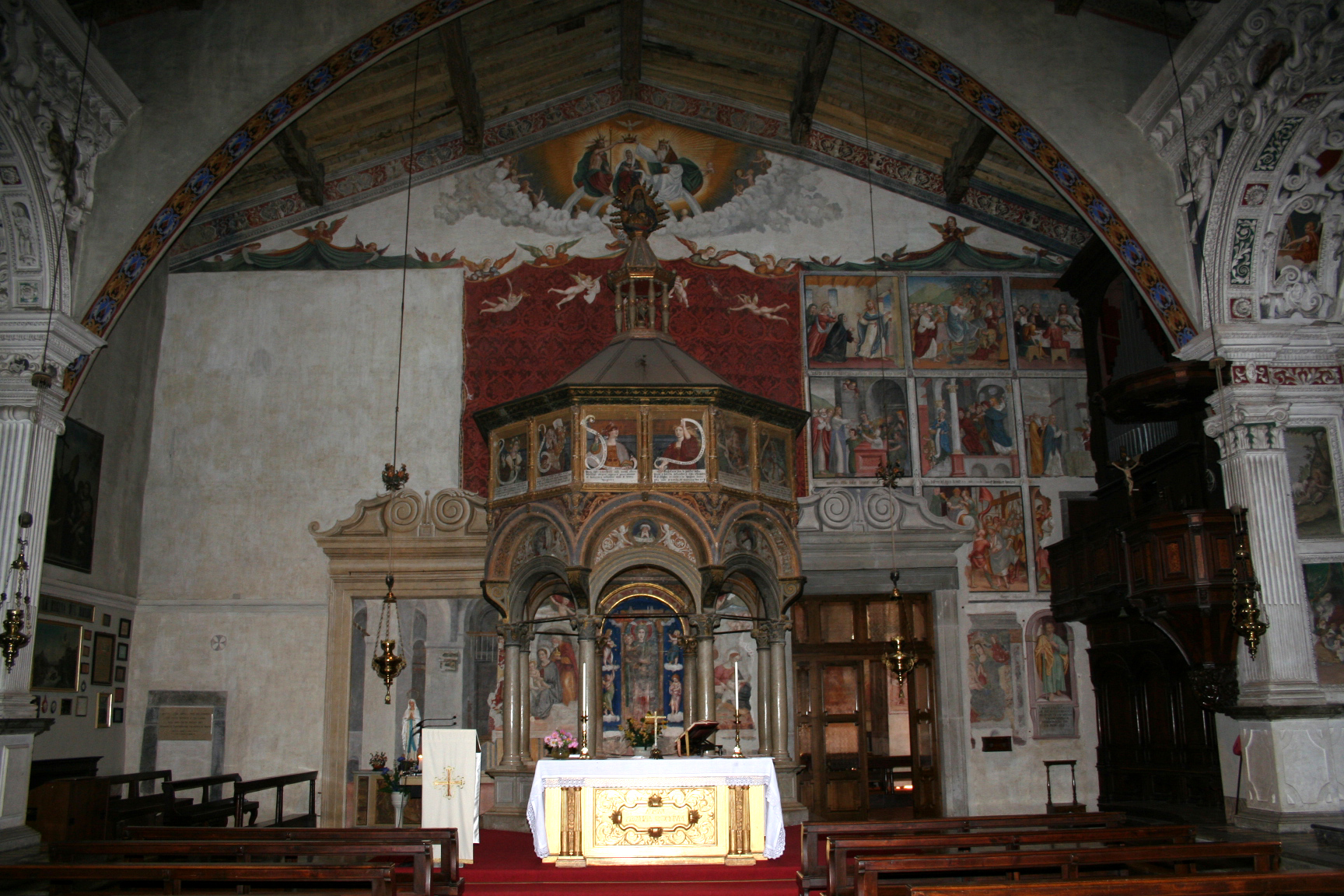
The interior of the church.

Sanctuary of Madonna del Castello is a Roman Catholic church in the town of Almenno San Salvatore, in the province of Bergamo, Lombardy, northern Italy.

The church does not have a clearstory. The style of the building indicates that it was built no later than the beginning of the 11th century.
