= Brembo (river) =

River in Italy

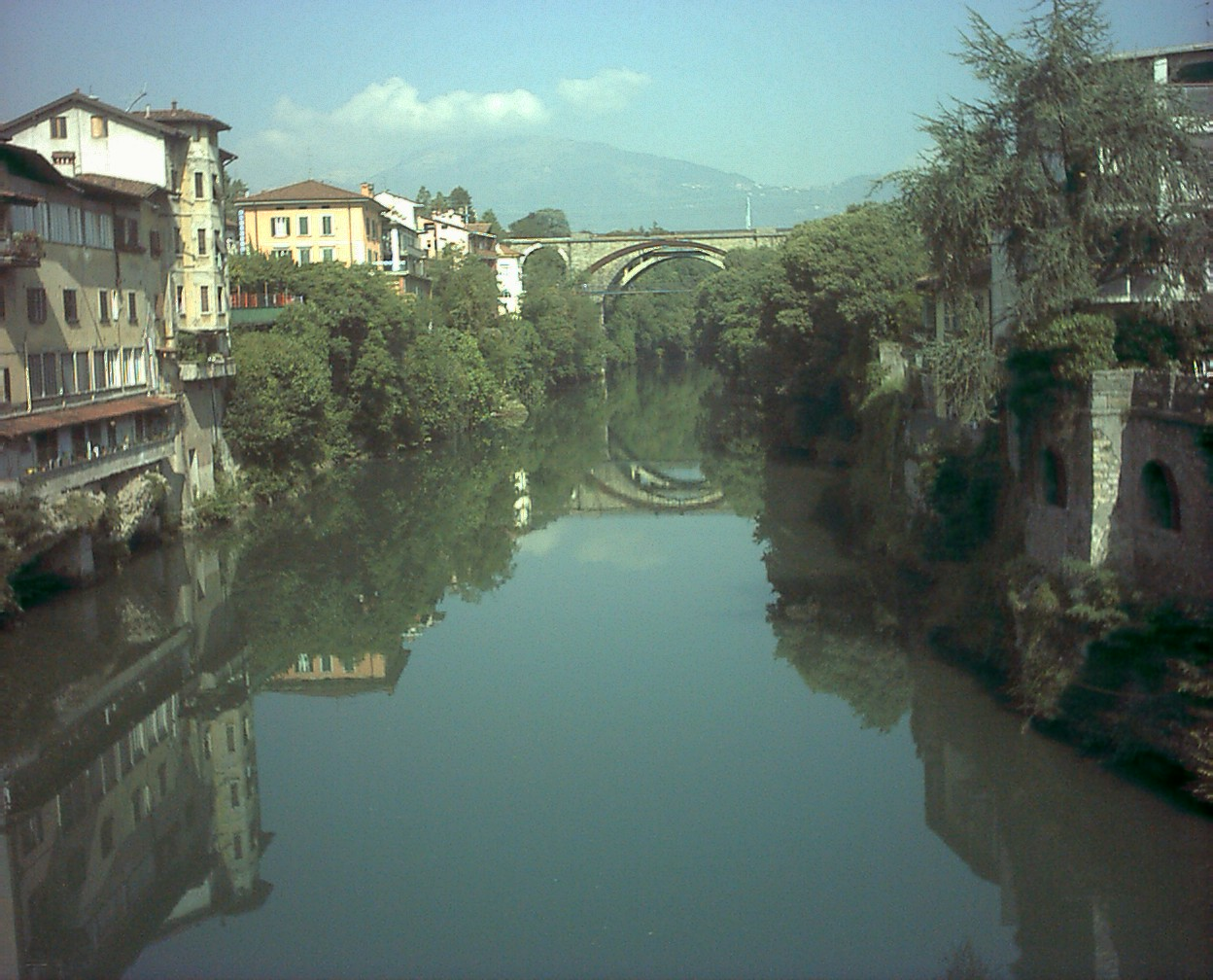
- The Brembo at Ponte San Pietro.

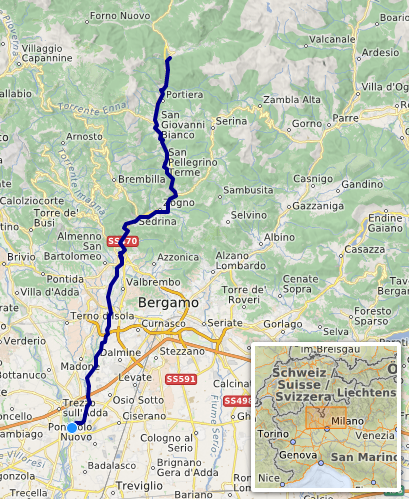

Location
- Country: Italy

Physical characteristics
- Source
  - location: Pizzo del Diavolo, Pizzo Tre Signori
- Mouth: Adda
  - coordinates: 45.5845°N 9.5381°E
- Length: 74 km (46 mi)
- Basin size: 935 km^{2} (361 mi^{2})
- Discharge
  - average: 30 m^{3}/s (1,100 cu ft/s)

Basin features
- Progression: Adda→ Po→ Adriatic Sea
- Tributaries
  - left: Parina, Quisa
  - right: Stabina, Enna

The Brembo (Lombard: Brèmb or Brèmp) is a 74-kilometer (46 mi) Italian river, a left tributary of the Adda, which runs entirely within the Province of Bergamo in the Lombardy Region.

== River ==
The Brembo springs from the Bergamo Alps at the foot of Pizzo del Diavolo; on reaching Lenna it is united with a second branch which flows from the mountains of Mezzoldo. During its course it is fed by numerous water courses; those with the greatest flows are the Stabina, from Valtorta, the Parina, the Enna, a torrente of the Val Taleggio which joins the Brembo in the small town of San Giovanni Bianco, the Ambria, a torrente of the Valle Serina and the Dordo, a stream of Isola di Bergamo.

The Brembo flows into the Adda near Crespi d'Adda, between the communes of Capriate San Gervasio, Canonica d'Adda and Vaprio d'Adda, at the border between the provinces of Bergamo and Milan.

In the course of the centuries the river has seen many floods, often on a disastrous scale as was the case on 18 July 1987 when immense damage was done to the environs of the Val Brembana.

== See also ==
- Val Brembana
