= Parco dei Colli di Bergamo =

Coordinates: 45.75°N 9.68°E

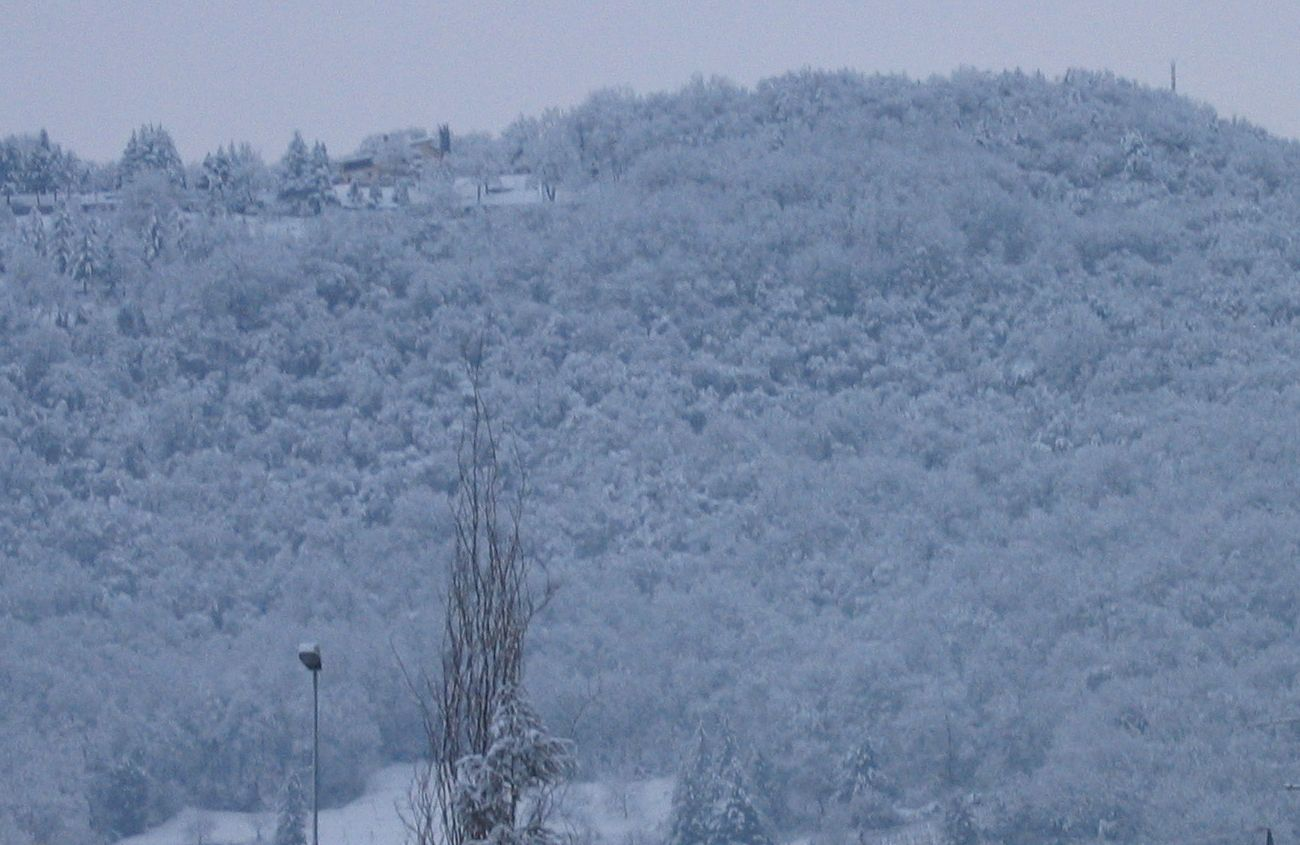
A view of Maresana in the territory of Parco dei Colli

Parco dei Colli di Bergamo is a natural park in the province of Bergamo, Lombardy, northern Italy.

== Geography ==
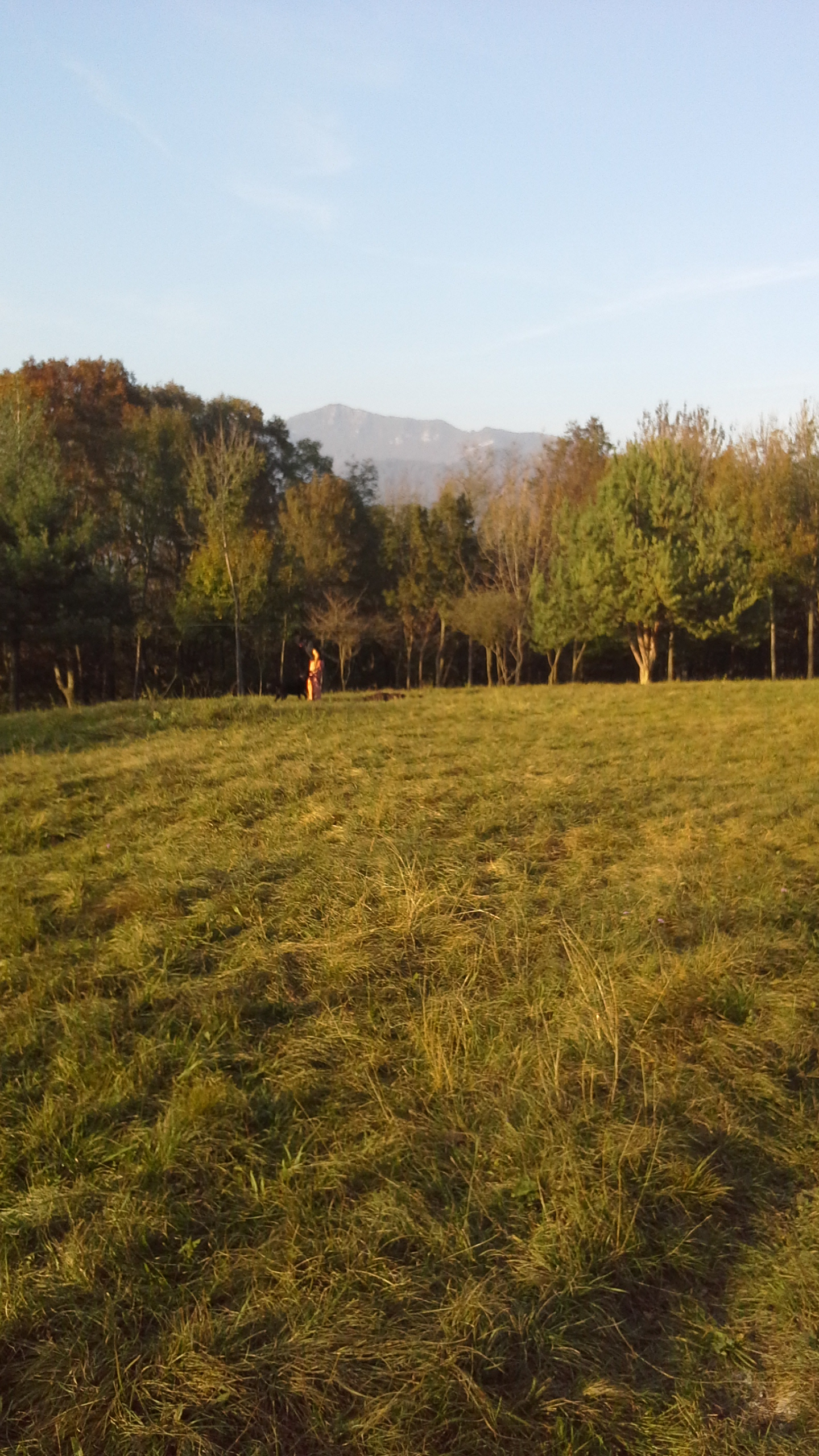
A view of Maresana in the territory of Parco dei Colli

The park has a surface of 47 square kilometres (18 mi^{2}) and covers part of the city of Bergamo and of the surrounding municipalities. The largest part of the surface of the park is covered by woods. The fauna of the park includes foxes, European badgers and others mammals, while the European robin is the most widespread bird. The highest point of the park is Canto Alto at 1,144 metres (3,753 ft) above sea level; the lowest point is at 244 metres (801 ft).

The park is crossed by the Morla and Quisa rivers.
