= Adoration of the Shepherds with Saint Roch =

Painting by Palma Vecchio

Adoration of the Shepherds with Saint Roch is a 1514-1515 oil on canvas painting by Palma Vecchio, now in the main side chapel of the church of San Lorenzo in Zogno, Italy.

== History ==
It was commissioned for the altar dedicated to Saint Joseph in Santa Maria, the church of the Franciscan monastery in Zogno. It was recorded on that altar during the pastoral visit by Carlo Borromeo in 1575. The first art historical work to mention it being in Zogno was Carlo Ridolfi's 1648 Le Maraviglie dell'arte: overo le vite de gl'illustri pittori, though that misattributed it to Giovanni Cariani, a Bergamo-born artist of the Venetian school very active in 16th century Bergamo. David Teniers the Younger disagreed with that theory, attributing it to Palma Vecchio in 1660. The artist may have made some copies that are now in private collections.

When the monastery was suppressed and closed and its property sold to the Furietti family, the artworks inside were taken on by the town council, which in turn ceded them to the convent of tertiary sisters of the church of Maria Santissima Annuciata in Zogno, which had been established there on 5 January 1731. Only in 1816, after this too had moved to the Montello district, the work was given to the Confraternity of Saint Joseph, which looked after the altar of the Nativity in the parish church of San Lorenzo. It was restored by the painter Crotta before being exhibited as altarpiece in the first side-chapel on the south side of the nave. Unfortunately this restoration turned out to be heavy-handed, though in the mid 20th century Mauro Pelliccioli managed to remove the heavy colour it had added and restoring the original ones. Around this time it was valued by the art historians Adolfo Venturi and Bernard Berenson, who confirmed its attribution to Palma, though not all critics agreed.

== Bibliography ==
- Giulio Gabanelli, La parrocchia di Zogno nei secoli, Clusone, Edizioni Ferrari.
