= Vincenzo Angelo Orelli =

Swiss-Italian painter

Vincenzo Angelo Orelli (1751–1813) was a Swiss-Italian painter, mainly of sacred subjects, active in a late baroque style.

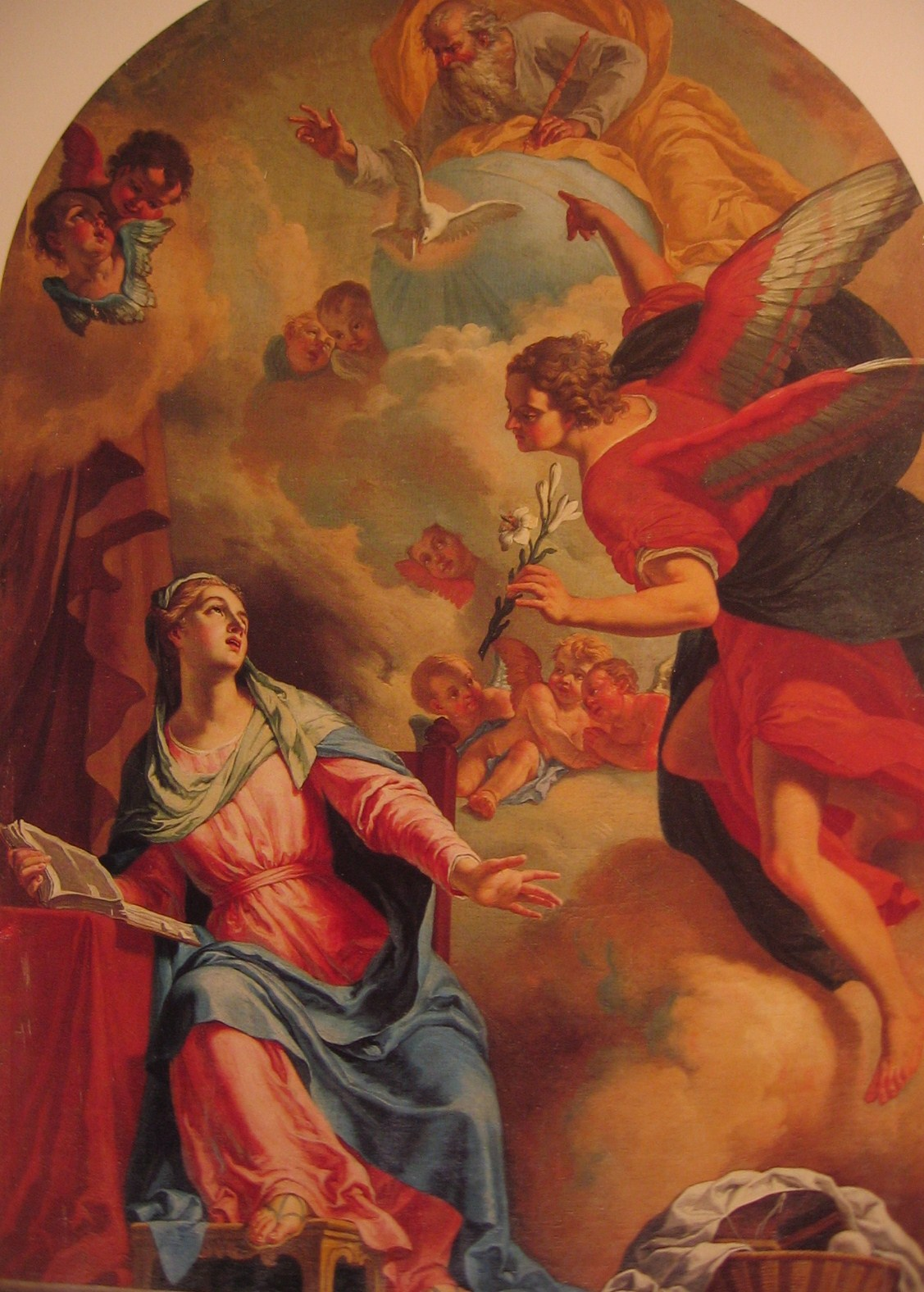
Annunciation in the Monastery of Santa Maria delle Terziarie francescane, Zogno, Bergamo

He was born in Locarno in the Ticino, but active also in Milan and Bergamo. He is the son of the painter Giuseppe Antonio Orelli. He painted the dome of the church of Serina, Lombardy. He painted an altarpiece now in the church of San Lorenzo Martire, Zogno. He also had the name of Francesco Saverio Angelico Orelli. He trained in Milan and travelled in 1773–1775 to Rome. He was a friend of Paolo Vincenzo Bonomini.
