= Algua =

- Comune
- Comune di Algua
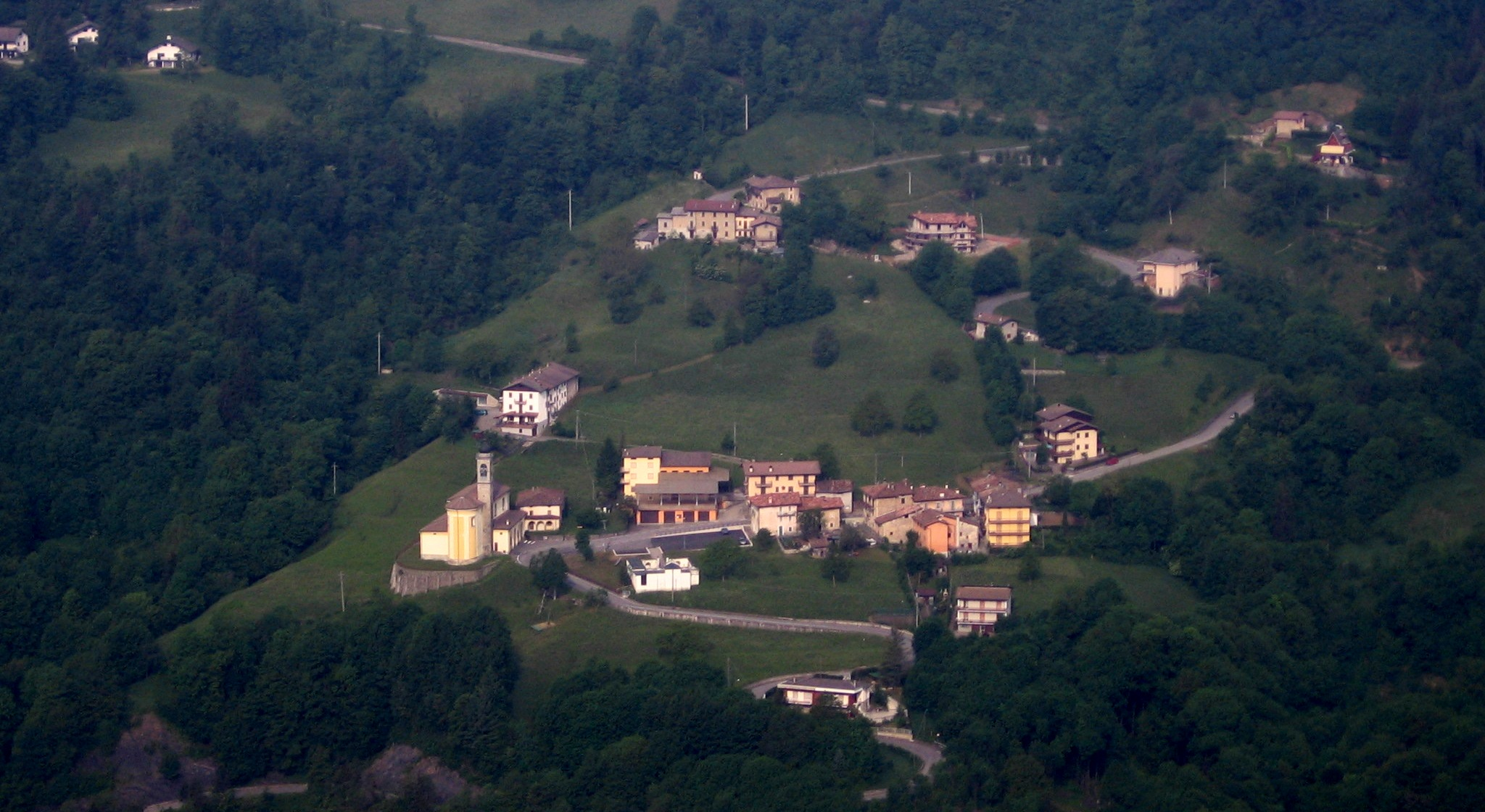
- frazione Sambusita

- Coat of arms

- Location of Algua in Italy Algua (Lombardy)
- Coordinates: 45°50′N 9°43′E
- Country: Italy
- Region: Lombardy
- Province: Province of Bergamo (BG)
- Frazioni: Frerola, Pagliaro, Rigosa, Sambusita

Government
  - Mayor: Luigi Marconi

Area
  - Total: 8.1 km^{2} (3.1 sq mi)
- Elevation: 432 m (1,417 ft)

Population (28 February 2017)
  - Total: 670
  - Density: 83/km^{2} (210/sq mi)
- Demonym: Alguesi
- Time zone: UTC+1 (CET)
  - Summer (DST): UTC+2 (CEST)
- Postal code: 24010
- Dialing code: 0345
- Website: Official website

Algua is a comune (municipality) in the Province of Bergamo in the Italian region Lombardy, located about 60 kilometres (37 mi) northeast of Milan and about 15 kilometres (9 mi) north of Bergamo.

The municipality of Algua contains the frazioni (subdivisions, mainly villages and hamlets) Frerola, Pagliaro, Sambusita and Rigosa.

Algua borders the following municipalities: Aviatico, Bracca, Costa di Serina, Nembro, San Pellegrino Terme, Selvino, Serina, and Zogno.
