= Dossena =

- Comune
- Comune di Dossena
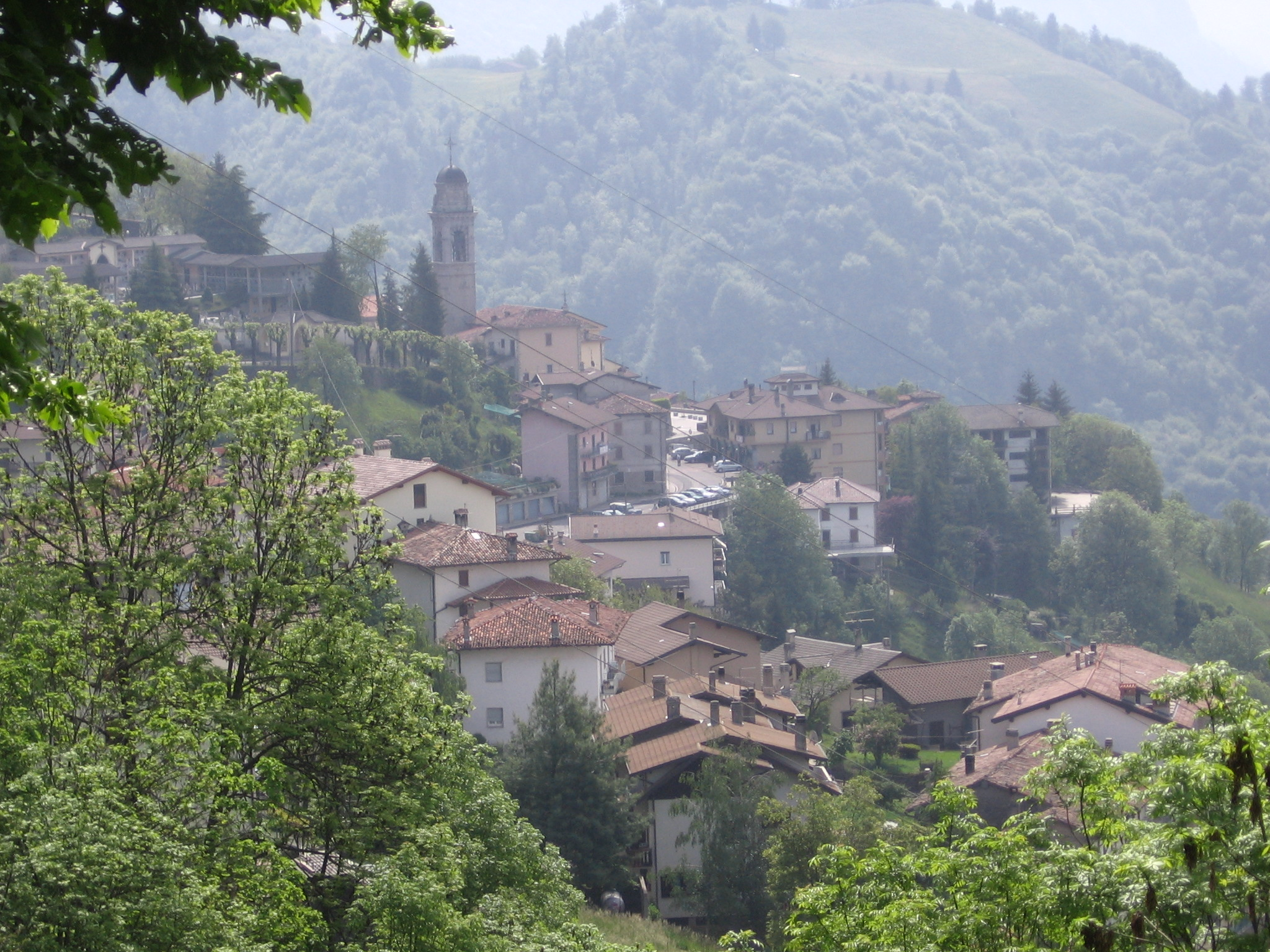
- Panorama of Dossena.

- Coat of arms

- Location within Italy Location within Lombardy
- Coordinates: 45°53′N 9°42′E
- Country: Italy
- Region: Lombardy
- Province: Bergamo (BG)

Government
  - Mayor: Anselmo Micheli

Area
  - Total: 19.6 km^{2} (7.6 sq mi)
- Elevation: 986 m (3,235 ft)

Population (31 December 2010)
  - Total: 966
  - Density: 49.3/km^{2} (128/sq mi)
- Demonym: Dossenesi
- Time zone: UTC+1 (CET)
  - Summer (DST): UTC+2 (CEST)
- Postal code: 24010
- Dialing code: 0345

Dossena (Bergamasque: Doséna; Latin: Dorsum) is a comune (municipality) in the Province of Bergamo in the Italian region of Lombardy, located about 60 kilometres (37 mi) northeast of Milan and about 20 kilometres (12 mi) north of Bergamo.

Dossena borders the following municipalities: Lenna, Roncobello, San Giovanni Bianco, San Pellegrino Terme, Serina. The parish church (15th century) has paintings by Paolo Veronese.
