= Bracca =

- Comune
- Comune di Bracca
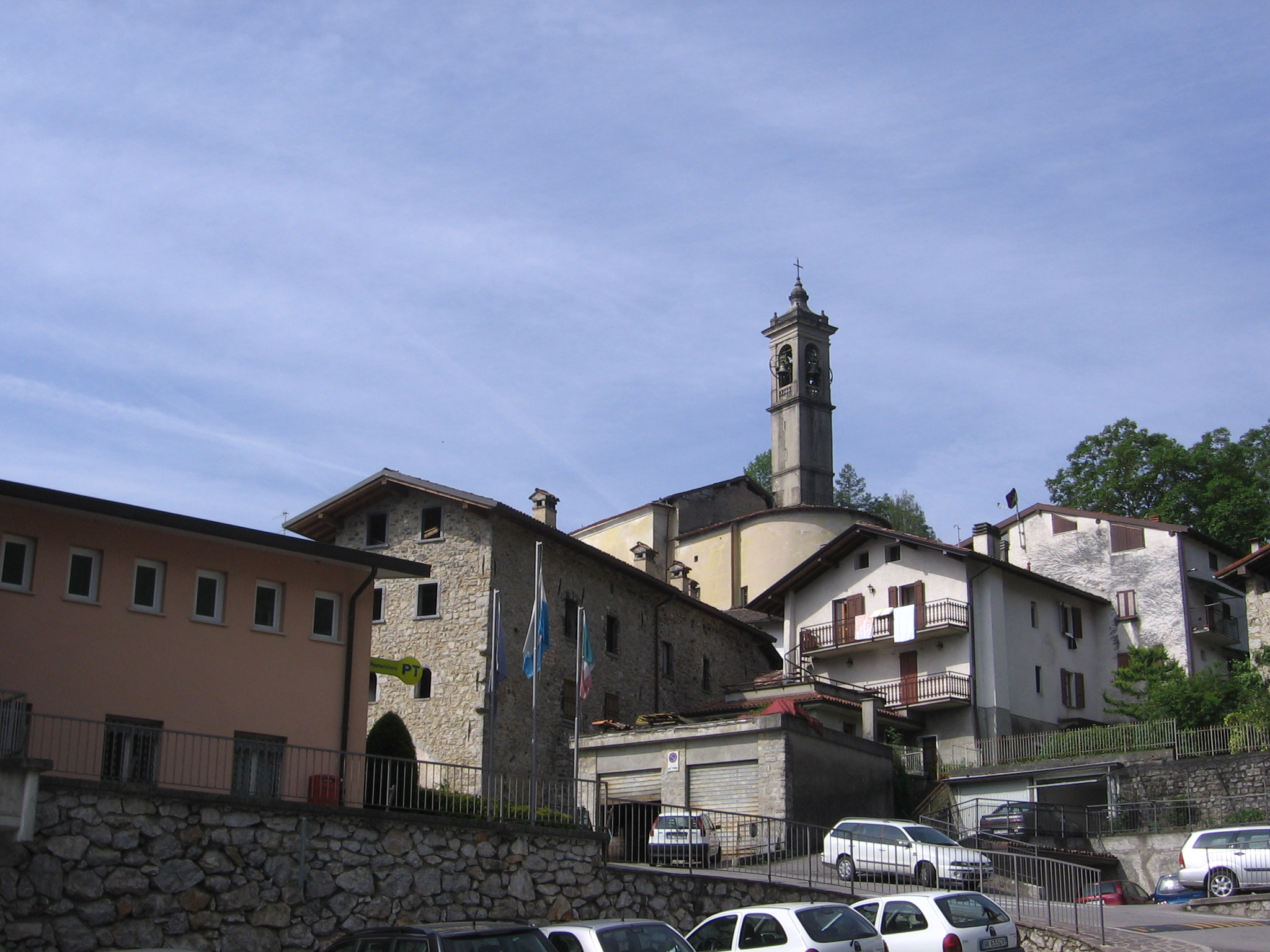
- Centre of the village

- Coat of arms

- Location within Italy Location within Lombardy
- Coordinates: 45°49′N 9°43′E
- Country: Italy
- Region: Lombardy
- Province: Province of Bergamo (BG)

Area
  - Total: 5.5 km^{2} (2.1 sq mi)
- Elevation: 400 m (1,300 ft)

Population (Dec. 2004)
  - Total: 827
  - Density: 150/km^{2} (390/sq mi)
- Demonym: Bracchesi
- Time zone: UTC+1 (CET)
  - Summer (DST): UTC+2 (CEST)
- Postal code: 24010
- Dialing code: 0345

Bracca (Bergamasque: Braca) is a comune (municipality) in the Province of Bergamo in the Italian region of Lombardy, located about 60 kilometres (37 mi) northeast of Milan and about 14 kilometres (9 mi) northeast of Bergamo. As of 31 December 2004, it had a population of 827 and an area of 5.5 square kilometres (2.1 mi^{2}).

Bracca borders the following municipalities: Algua, Costa di Serina, San Pellegrino Terme, Zogno.

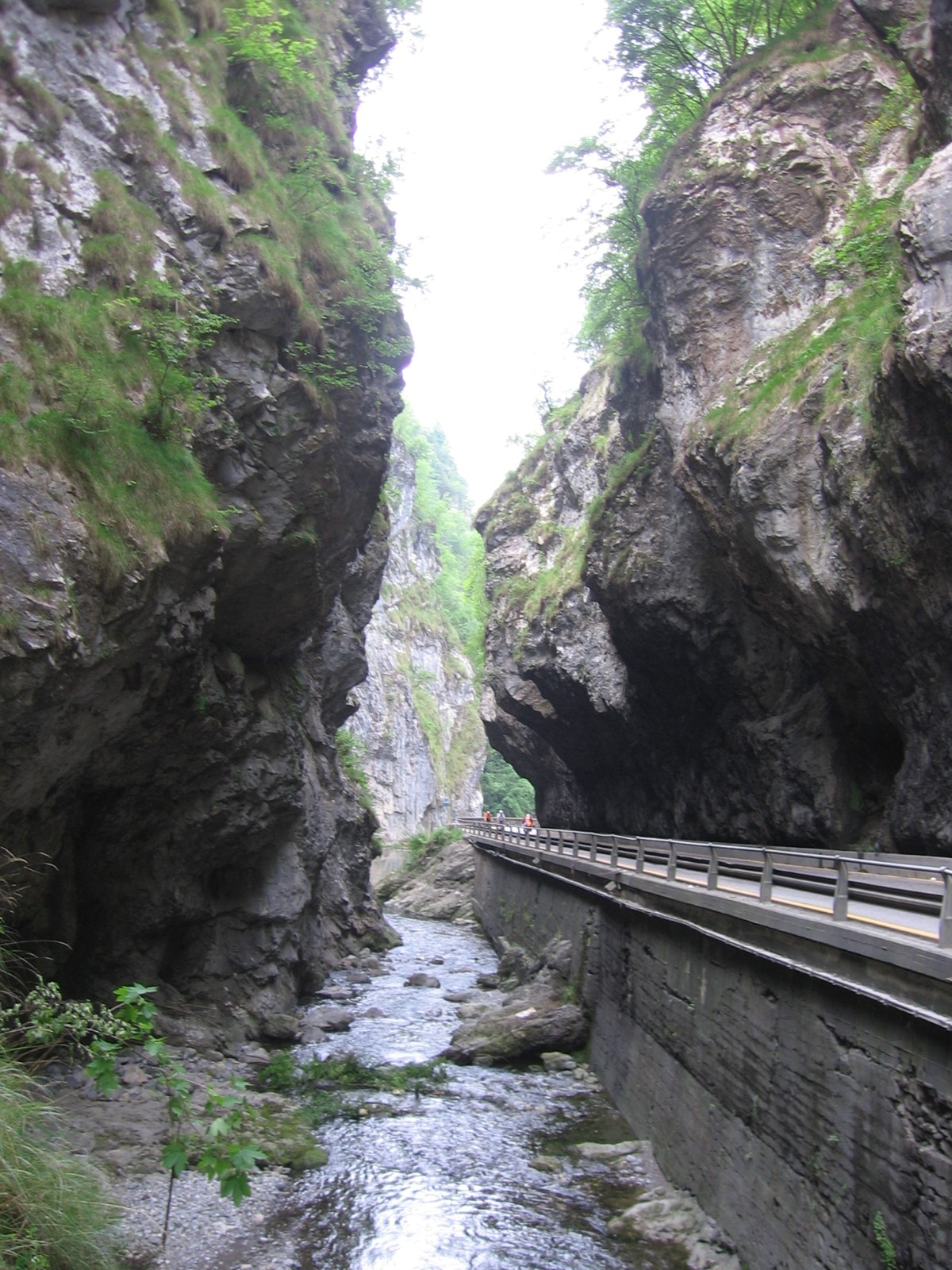
Bracca quarries

== Demographic evolution ==
Historical population

Year	Pop.	±%
1861	487	—
1871	582	+19.5%
1881	712	+22.3%
1901	792	+11.2%
1911	891	+12.5%

Year	Pop.	±%
1921	910	+2.1%
1931	840	−7.7%
1936	740	−11.9%
1951	767	+3.6%
1961	759	−1.0%

Year	Pop.	±%
1971	693	−8.7%
1981	674	−2.7%
1991	620	−8.0%
2001	755	+21.8%

Source: Data from ISTAT
