= San Lorenzo Martire, Zogno =

Church in Zogno, Italy

Coordinates: 45.794000°N 9.663289°E

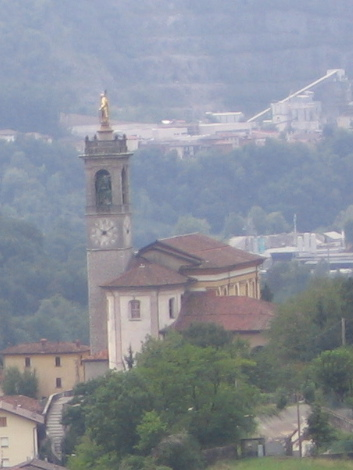
The church in Zogno

San Lorenzo Martire is a Roman Catholic church located in Zogno, region of Lombardy, Italy.

== History ==
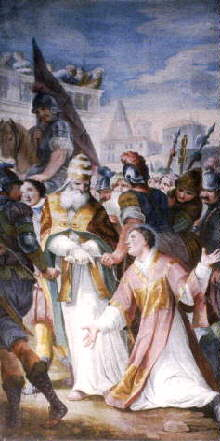
Albrici fresco depicting St Lawrence with Pope Sixtus II.

A church on the site was begun in 1431 just outside the castle in the town. By 1458, it was within the town walls, but incomplete. Construction of the bell-tower, the long staircase leading the church, the adjacent cemetery, and interior decoration occurred afterwards. In 1472, the church was consecrated.

The statue of St Lawrence, atop the bell-tower, was made by Francesco Albera of Milan, who also sculpted the 12 apostles depicted in the interior. The decoration has paintings by Vincenzo Angelo Orelli, Palma il Vecchio, Enrico Albricci, Giovanni Paolo Cavagna, and Rillosi. The 15 mysteries of the Rosary are by Francesco Zucco. The bronze baptismal font was completed in the 20th century by Alberto Meli. The choir was painted by Giuseppe Lazzaroni.
