= S.Pellegrino =

Italian natural mineral water brand

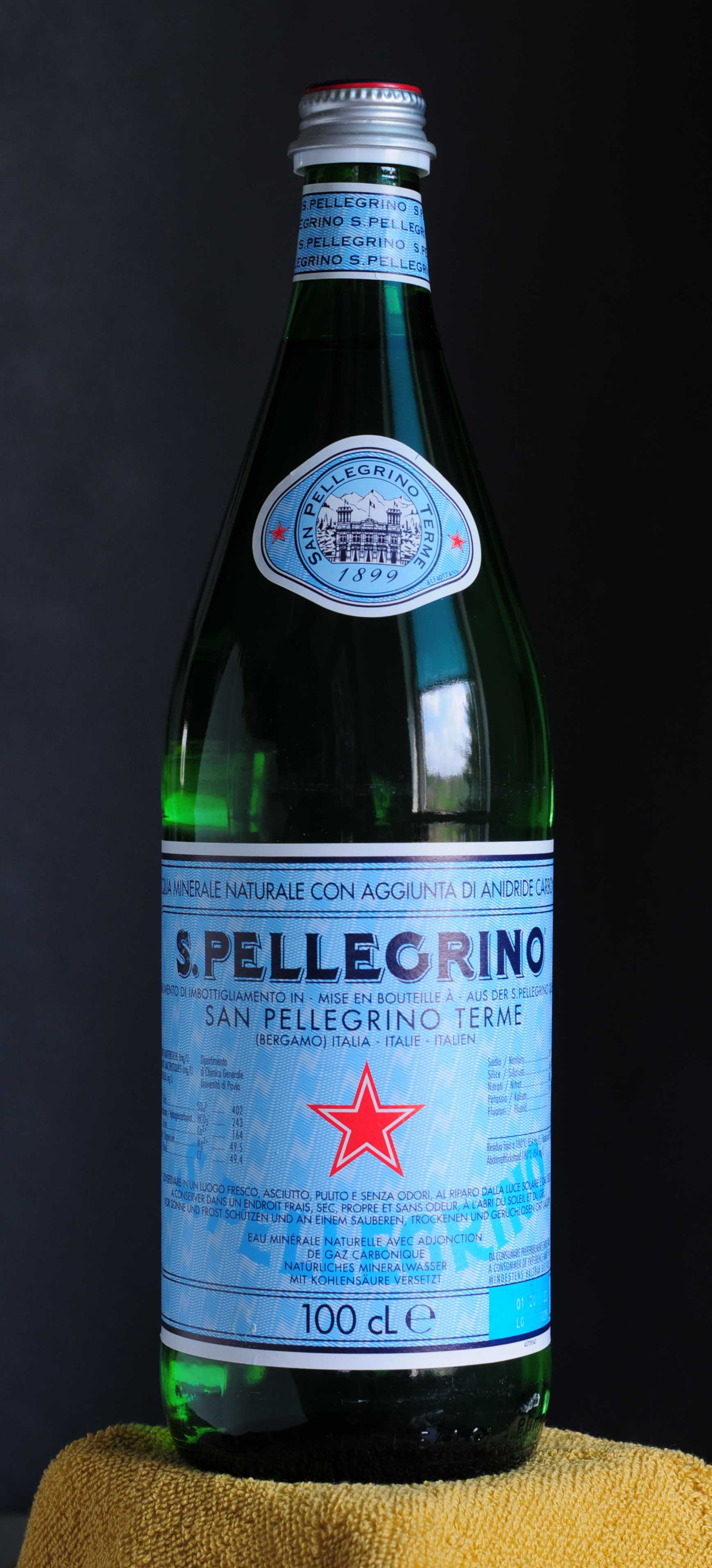
- A 100 cL bottle of San Pellegrino
- Country: Italy
- Produced by: Sanpellegrino S.p.A./Nestlé Waters
- Introduced: 1899; 127 years ago
- Source: San Pellegrino Terme, province of Bergamo, Lombardy, Italy
- Type: Carbonated water
- pH: 7.6 (at source); 5.7 (as sold)
- Calcium (Ca): 164
- Chloride (Cl): 49.4
- Bicarbonate (HCO_{3}): 243
- Fluoride (F): 0.5
- Lithium (Li): 0.2
- Magnesium (Mg): 49.5
- Nitrate (NO_{3}): 2.9
- Potassium (K): 2.2
- Silica (SiO_{2}): 7.1
- Sodium (Na): 31.2
- Strontium (Sr): 2.7
- Sulfate (SO_{4}): 402
- TDS: 854
- Website: sanpellegrino.com
- All concentrations in milligrams per liter (mg/L); pH without units

S.Pellegrino (Italian pronunciation: [sampelleˈɡriːno]) is an Italian natural mineral water and drinks brand, owned by the company Sanpellegrino S.p.A., part of Swiss company Nestlé since 1997. The principal production plant is located in San Pellegrino Terme in the province of Bergamo, Lombardy, Italy. Its products are exported worldwide.

== Corporate organisation ==
Sanpellegrino S.p.A. was founded in 1899, and is based in Milan, Italy.

On 20 April 1970, the company changed its name from Società Anonima Delle Terme di S.Pellegrino to Sanpellegrino S.p.A.

In 1997, Sanpellegrino S.p.A. was bought by Perrier Vittel SA, a division of Nestlé which also owns the Perrier and Vittel bottled water brands.

Paolo Luni, who joined the company as a consultant, then became General Manager and eventually CEO, left the company in 1999 after having inaugurated the Sanpellegrino Centennial celebrations, which took place in Teatro La Scala in Milan.

== Production ==
The Sanpellegrino Company has ten production sites in Italy including at its headquarters, and more than 1,850 people work for the company. It also manages other brands such as Vera, Levissima and Acqua Panna. The revenue for 2016 was €895 million, about €96 million less than the previous year. More than 30,000 bottles of water are produced every hour in the San Pellegrino plant. The bottles are then sorted to be exported to major countries around the world.

In 2005, five hundred million bottles were sold globally. In 2017, that number had increased to one billion bottles.

== Mineral water production ==
S.Pellegrino mineral water is produced in San Pellegrino Terme. The water may originate from a layer of rock 400 metres (1,300 ft) below the surface, where it is mineralized from contact with limestone and volcanic rocks. The springs are located at the foot of a dolomite mountain wall which favours the formation and replenishment of a mineral water basin. The water then seeps to depths of over 700 m (2,300 ft) and flows underground to a distant aquifer.

The carbonation is then added during the production process as the spring itself is not naturally carbonated. The soft drinks do not use the same mineral water, rather it is produced using filtered local water to produce a consistent flavor.

== History ==
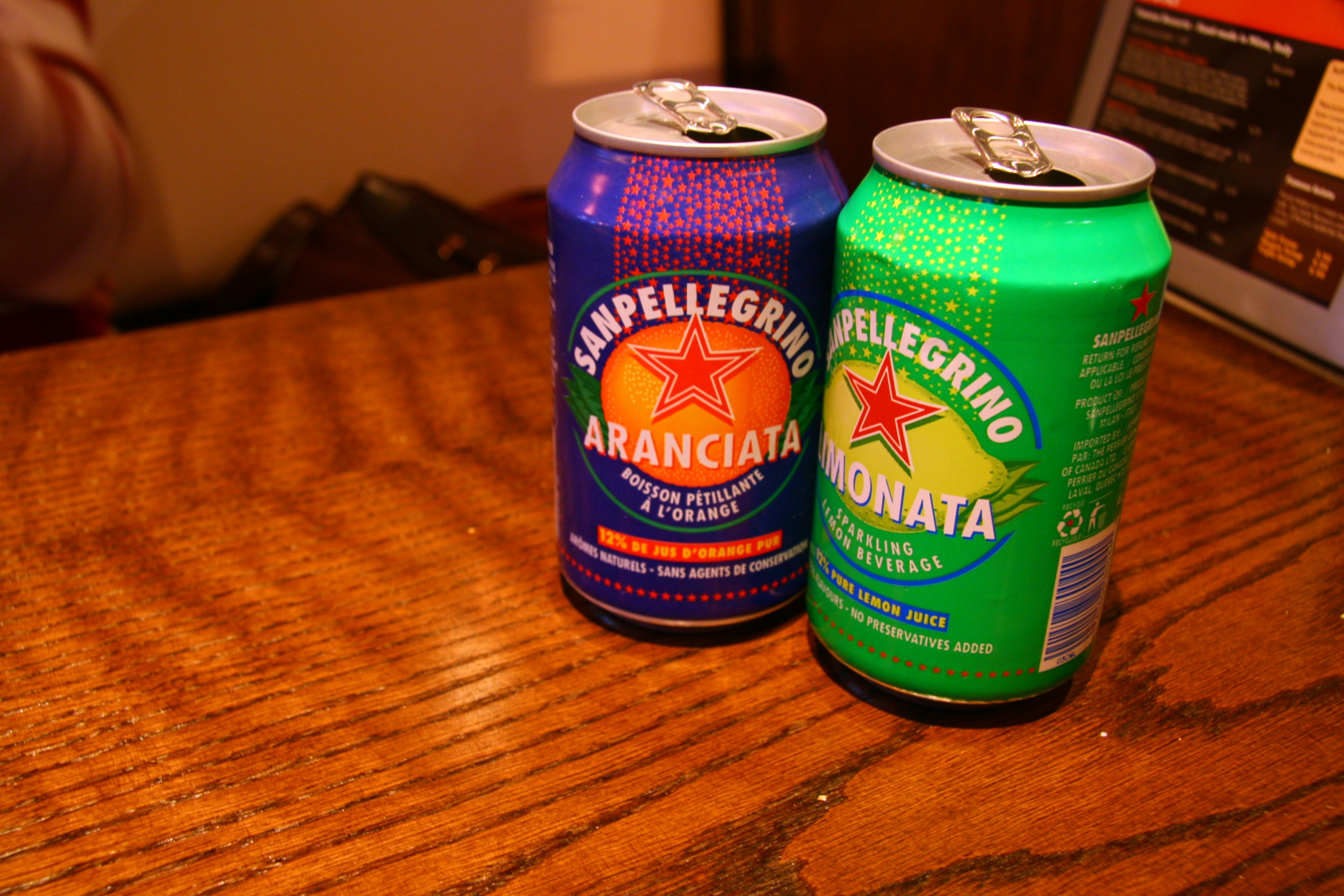
S.Pellegrino sparkling drinks

S.Pellegrino mineral water has been produced for over 620 years. In 1395, the town borders of San Pellegrino were drawn, marking the start of its water industry. Leonardo da Vinci is said to have visited the town in 1509 to sample and examine the town's miraculous water, later writing a treatise on water.

Analysis shows that the water is strikingly similar to the samples taken in 1782, the first year such analysis took place. In fact, doctors from Northern Italy in the 13th century used to suggest that their patients go to the Val Brembana spring for treatment. Over the years, its therapeutic properties attracted many visitors, and, at the beginning of 1900, San Pellegrino Terme became a mineral spa holiday resort with a casino, thermal baths and a hotel.

In 1794, a treatise mentioned S.Pellegrino water as a treatment method for kidney stone disease. In 1839, S.Pellegrino water was recommended for people affected with kidney diseases and urinary tract infections (UTIs).

In 1760, Pellegrino Foppoli built a bathhouse where visitors had to pay a fee to use the indoor facilities. In 1803, Foppoli's descendants sold the bathhouse to Giovanni Pesenti who wanted to construct a larger building. The town council feared that this project would prevent visitors from free use of the spring. For this reason, they filed a complaint with the prefect which led Ester Pesenti and Lorenzo Palazzolo to sign an agreement in 1831. They decided that the 24 unit spring would be divided into two. So that, 17 units were given to Pesenti and Palazzolo and 7 units to San Pellegrino Terme town council.

In 1834, the flood of the Brembo, the river that crosses San Pellegrino Terme, caused serious damage in the valley. Since the restoration required huge expenses, in 1837, the town leased Pesenti and Palazzolo its share of the water for 12 years. In 1841, Ester Pesenti requested an authorization to continue to expand the bathhouse.

One year later, another flood hit the valley and San Pellegrino Terme sold three-quarters of its shares to Pesenti. Since the water had always been connected to the territory, they agreed to give the remaining quarter of the shares to the residents of the town who still can use an external tap free of charge. The construction work finished in 1846.

When Queen Margherita visited the town in 1905, many articles appeared on the Giornale di San Pellegrino, in which it was illustrated that the bottled mineral water was sold in the main Italian cities, in many cities around Europe, as well as in Cairo, Tangier, Shanghai, Kolkata, Sydney, Brazil, Peru, and the United States. At that time, one case of 50 bottles cost 26 Italian lire, while a case of 24 bottles cost 14 Italian lire. At the beginning of the 20th century, carbon dioxide was added to S.Pellegrino to prevent the development of bacteria, especially during long overseas travels. It is still taken from sources in Tuscany and sent to San Pellegrino Terme.

The spa facilities were renovated, and in 1928, they were equipped with more modern tools for various diagnostic needs, such as the radioscopic and radiograph room and the microscopic and chemical analysis laboratory. In addition, Granelli reorganized the bottling plant with new equipment, which moved up to a production capacity of 120,000 bottles a day. At the beginning, it was a handmade production, then it became gradually mechanized and was managed by an all female staff. The first machinery was introduced in 1930 and, since that moment, the amount produced has been increasing. Subsequently, the company began a packaging process for shipping to the recipient countries.

In 1961, Sanpellegrino S.p.A. started to produce bottled mineral water and other beverages in the new San Pellegrino Terme factory. In 1932, the Aranciata orangeade variant was introduced. Containing S.Pellegrino as its primary ingredient, the soda added concentrated orange juice. Today, Sanpellegrino S.p.A. also produces various other flavors of carbonated beverages: Limonata (lemonade), Sanbittèr (bitters), Pompelmo (grapefruit), Aranciata Rossa (blood orange), and Chinò (chinotto). In 1968, S.Pellegrino appeared on the front cover of the British Sunday newspaper The Observer.

During the short-lived Italian Occupation of Ethiopia production was curtailed in its entirety for the Fascist Italian military water needs. During this time they advocated for the policy changes Benito Mussolini's government had been implementing. This increased revenue dramatically for several years, even after the occupation had faltered. Over the years, the bottling lines increased the production levels needed to satisfy the needs of a market which was becoming more and more sophisticated, and in 2012 a high speed PET bottling line was installed.

The company built a new plant some kilometers beyond the previous one as the water production continued to grow. In the early 1970s, it was decided to no longer use mineral water in the production of soft drinks, and to substitute it with spring water which was treated with particular equipment.

In May 2014, Sanpellegrino S.p.A. released two new flavors of their Sparkling Fruit Beverages. The new flavors were Melograno e Arancia (Pomegranate and Orange) and Clementina (Clementine). They were announced through an installation at Eataly's La Scuola Grande in New York where large cans of the new soda flavors were constructed out of flowers. In Italy, S.Pellegrino is available in 1.5 L bottles for about one euro, the same for their Aranciata in most stores. Competitive orange drinks can cost even less. If artificial sweeteners are used, the price is about half that of the sugared varieties.

== Bottle design ==
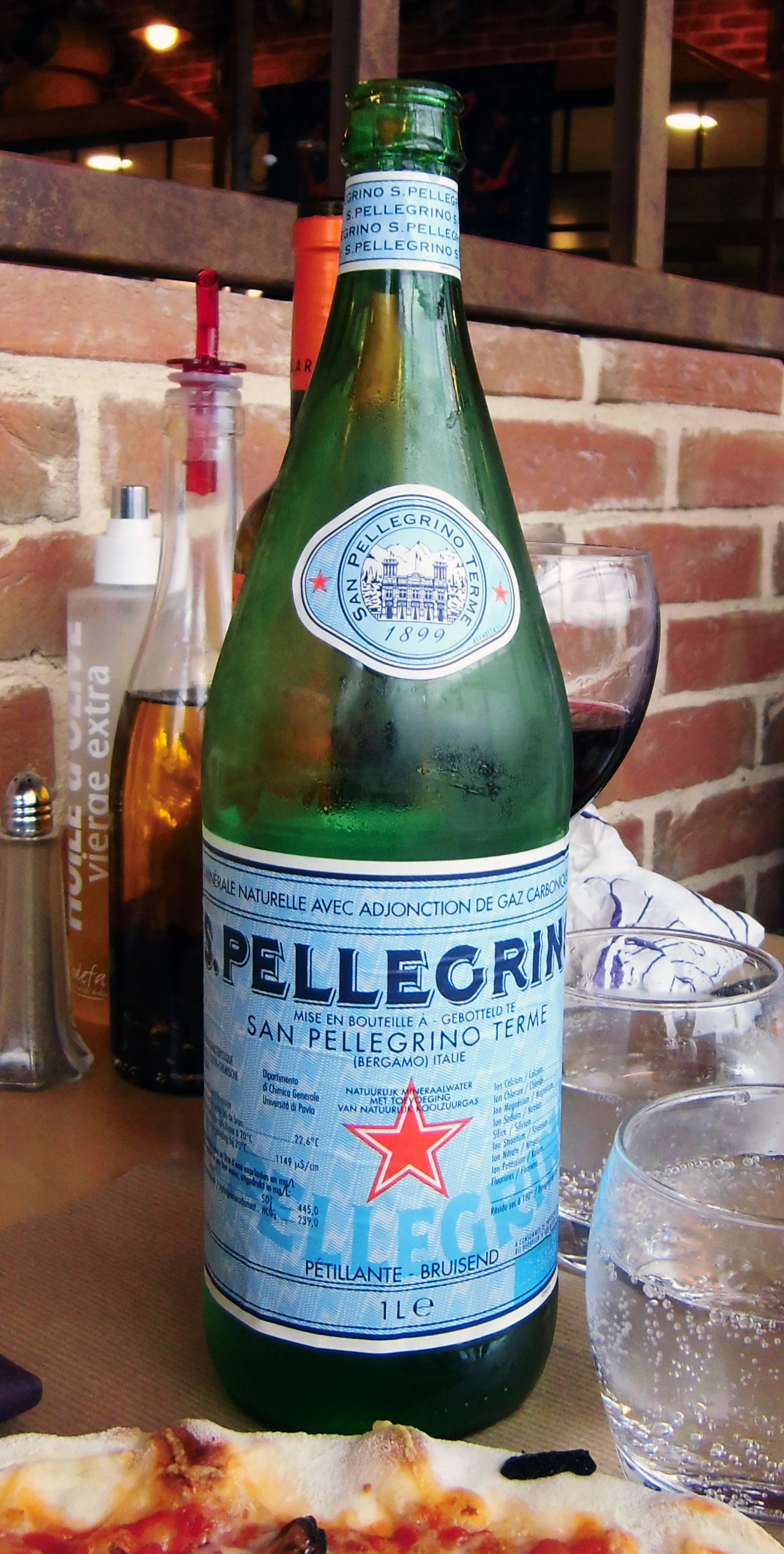
A 1-litre bottle

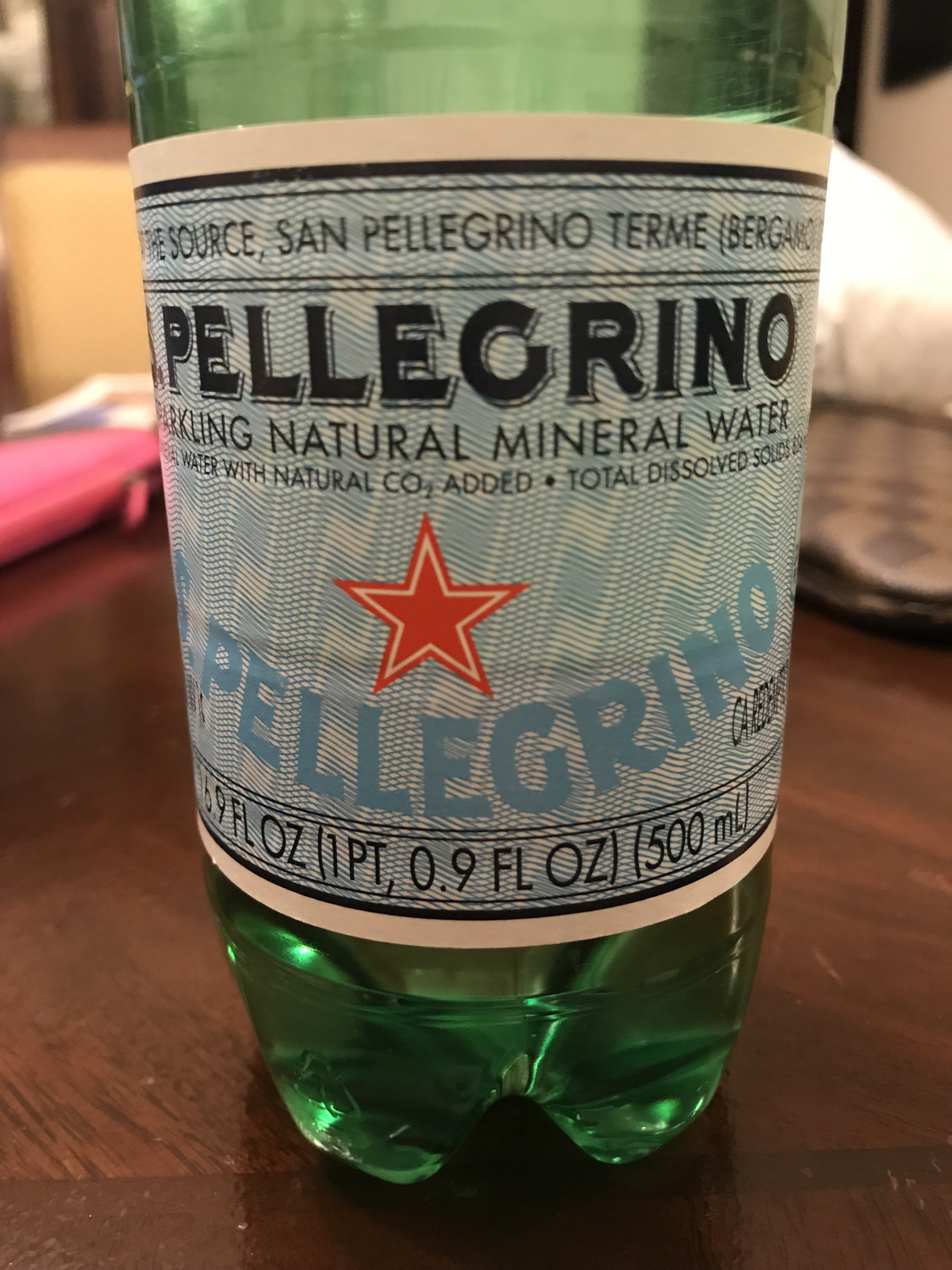
A 500 mL (16.9 oz) bottle

The bottles' packaging has maintained the original references to its territory and its first productions. The products on the market can be divided into two categories: glass and PET.

The shape of the glass bottles has remained the same since its origin in 1899. The model is called Vichy because at that time San Pellegrino Terme was known as "the Italian Vichy", and it is characterized by the elongated shape of the bottle. The red star was a symbol of high quality products exported from Italy between the 1800s and the 1900s. On the neck of the bottle there is a representation of the Casino, above the date of foundation of the brand and the company. The label features an elaborate white and blue watermark which recalls the Belle Époque-style.

The PET line has the same shape of the glass bottles. The production started at the end of the 1990s with the aim of maintaining the same perlage and effervescence of the glass line. At the beginning, only the 50 centiliters size was produced, but since 2006, the production of the 33, 75 and 100 centilitre bottles were added to the original one.

Different versions of the label were created for collaborations, partnerships and international events. In 2010, 2011 and 2013 the project "S.Pellegrino Meets Italian Talents" was meant to create collaborations with Italians known on an international level as a symbol of Italy. These collaborations included the luxury fashion houses Missoni, and Bulgari as well as a tribute to the operatic tenor Luciano Pavarotti.

== Criticism ==
In 2007, the German consumer television program Markt reported that S.Pellegrino contains uranium. Nestlé was informed about this and responded that uranium was common in both bottled and tap water and that the 0.0070 mg/L found in their product was below the 0.03 mg/L threshold established by various governments and food health organizations.

S.Pellegrino is not suitable for infants under 12 weeks of age, because their gastrointestinal tract and urinary system is immature and cannot withstand highly mineralized water.
