= Serina, Lombardy =

Serina
- Comune
- Comune di Serina
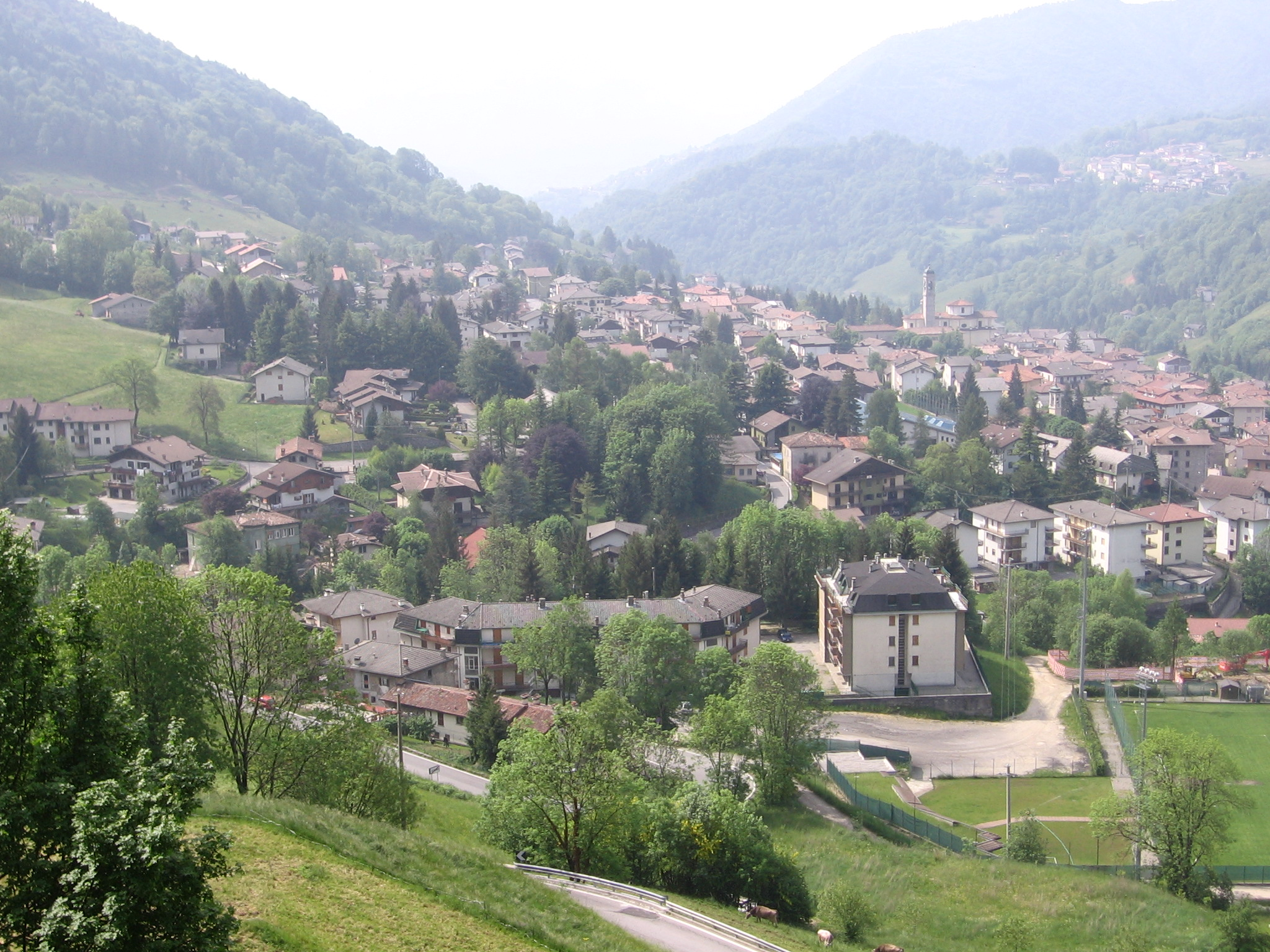
- Serina

- Location within Italy Location within Lombardy
- Coordinates: 45°52′N 9°44′E
- Country: Italy
- Region: Lombardy
- Province: Province of Bergamo (BG)
- Frazioni: Corone, Lepreno, Bagnella, Valpiana

Area
  - Total: 27.6 km^{2} (10.7 sq mi)
- Elevation: 720 m (2,360 ft)

Population (Dec. 2004)
  - Total: 2,214
  - Density: 80.2/km^{2} (208/sq mi)
- Demonym: Serinesi
- Time zone: UTC+1 (CET)
  - Summer (DST): UTC+2 (CEST)
- Postal code: 24017
- Dialing code: 0345
- Website: Official website

Serina is a comune (municipality) in the Province of Bergamo in the Italian region of Lombardy, located about 60 kilometres (37 mi) northeast of Milan and about 31 kilometres (19 mi) northeast of Bergamo. As of 31 December 2004, it had a population of 2,214 and an area of 27.6 square kilometres (10.7 mi^{2}).

The municipality of Serina contains the frazioni (subdivisions, mainly villages and hamlets) Corone, Lepreno, Bagnella, and Valpiana.

Serina borders the following municipalities: Algua, Cornalba, Costa di Serina, Dossena, Oltre il Colle, Roncobello, San Pellegrino Terme.

== Demographic evolution ==
Historical population

Year	Pop.	±%
1861	1,459	—
1871	1,745	+19.6%
1881	1,754	+0.5%
1901	2,023	+15.3%
1911	2,572	+27.1%

Year	Pop.	±%
1921	2,713	+5.5%
1931	2,338	−13.8%
1936	2,116	−9.5%
1951	2,129	+0.6%
1961	2,173	+2.1%

Year	Pop.	±%
1971	2,095	−3.6%
1981	2,030	−3.1%
1991	2,129	+4.9%
2001	2,193	+3.0%

Source: Data from ISTAT

== Notable people ==
- Palma Vecchio (ca.1480 – 1528), a Venetian painter of the Italian High Renaissance.
