= Zogno =

- Comune
- Comune di Zogno
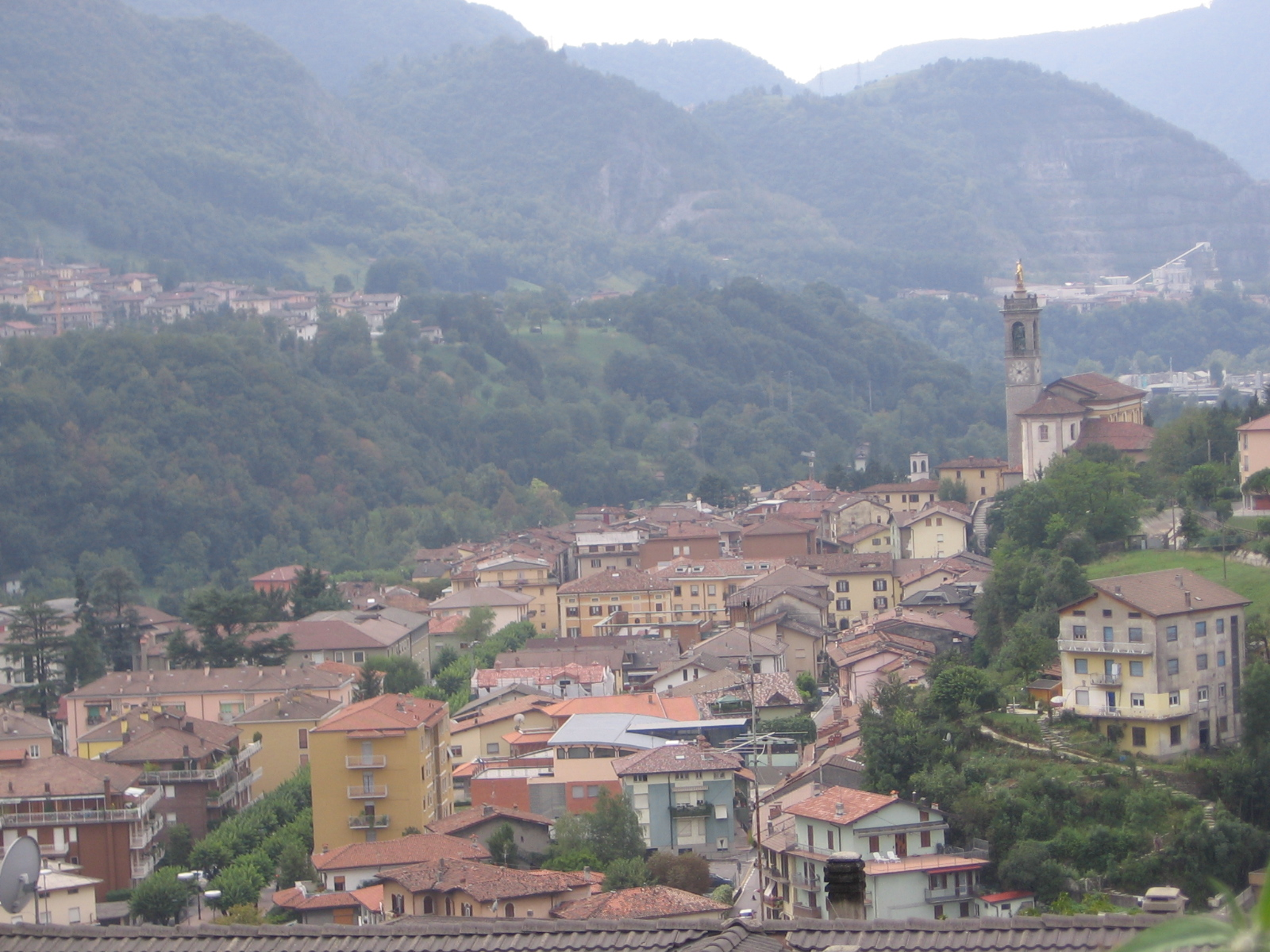
- Zogno

- Coat of arms

- Location within Italy Location within Lombardy
- Coordinates: 45°48′N 9°40′E
- Country: Italy
- Region: Lombardy
- Province: Bergamo (BG)
- Frazioni: Endenna, Somendenna, Grumello de' Zanchi, Poscante, Stabello, Ambria, Miragolo San Marco, Miragolo San Salvatore

Government
  - Mayor: Giuliano Gianpietro Ghisalberti

Area
  - Total: 35.21 km^{2} (13.59 sq mi)
- Elevation: 334 m (1,096 ft)

Population (30 November 2017)
  - Total: 8,930
  - Density: 254/km^{2} (657/sq mi)
- Demonym: Zognesi
- Time zone: UTC+1 (CET)
  - Summer (DST): UTC+2 (CEST)
- Postal code: 24019
- Dialing code: 0345
- Website: Official website

Zogno (Bergamasque: Dógn) is a comune (municipality) in the Province of Bergamo in the Italian region of Lombardy, located about 50 kilometres (31 mi) northeast of Milan and about 11 kilometres (7 mi) north of Bergamo.

Zogno borders the following municipalities: Algua, Alzano Lombardo, Bracca, Brembilla, Costa di Serina, Nembro, Ponteranica, San Pellegrino Terme, Sedrina, Sorisole.

Among the sites in the church are the 17th century church of San Lorenzo Martire and the modern-style church of the Santuario di Maria Santissima Regina.

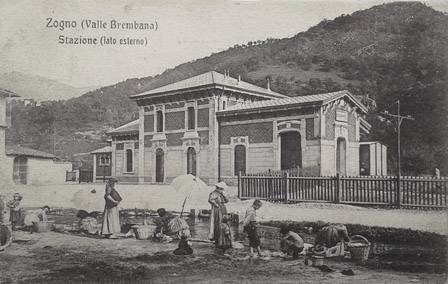
an old image of the railway Station
