= Costa Serina =

- Comune
- Comune di Costa Serina
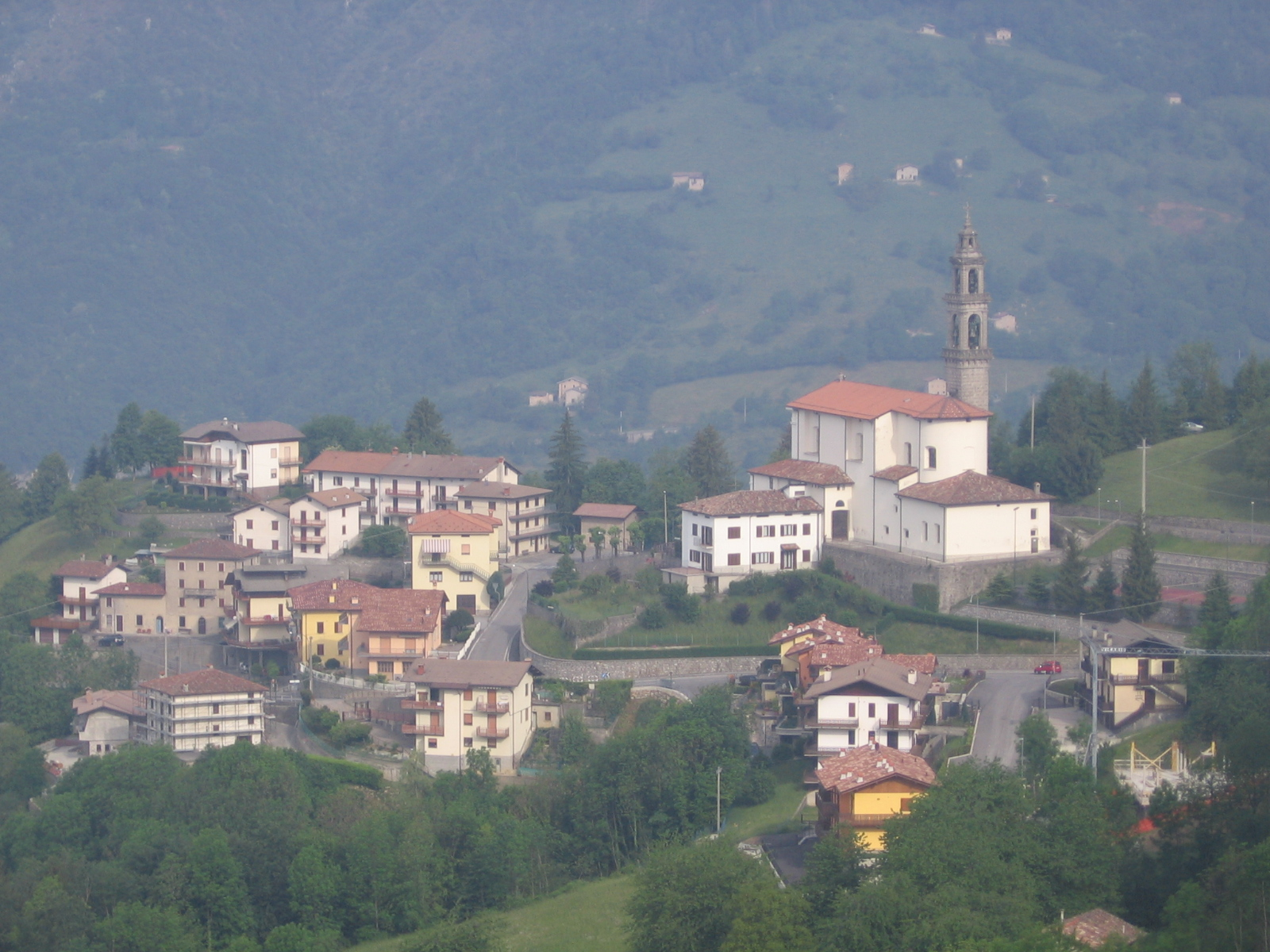
- Costa Serina

- Location within Italy Location within Lombardy
- Coordinates: 45°49′N 9°44′E
- Country: Italy
- Region: Lombardy
- Province: Province of Bergamo (BG)
- Frazioni: Ascensione, Trafficanti, Ambriola

Government
  - Mayor: Fausto Dolci

Area
  - Total: 12 km^{2} (4.6 sq mi)
- Elevation: 868 m (2,848 ft)

Population (30 June 2017)
  - Total: 898
  - Density: 75/km^{2} (190/sq mi)
- Demonym: Costaserinesi
- Time zone: UTC+1 (CET)
  - Summer (DST): UTC+2 (CEST)
- Postal code: 24010
- Dialing code: 0345
- Patron saint: St. Lawrence
- Saint day: 10 August
- Website: Official website

Costa Serina (Bergamasque: Còsta) is a comune in the province of Bergamo, in Lombardy, northern Italy. Neighbouring communes are Algua, Aviatico, Bracca, Cornalba, Gazzaniga, Serina, Vertova and Zogno.

== Notable people ==
- Antonio Pietro Cortinovis (1885–1984), Italian Roman Catholic professed religious
