= Selvino =

- Comune
- Comune di Selvino
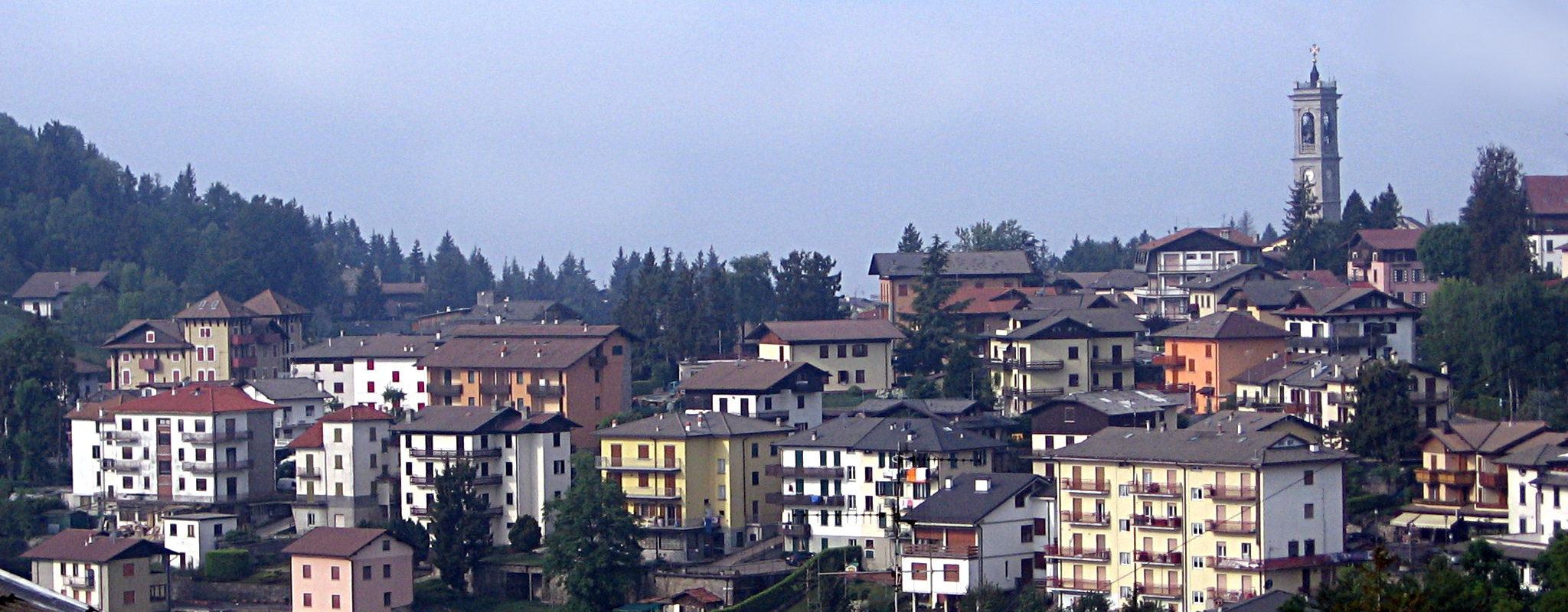
- Selvino

- Location within Italy Location within Lombardy
- Coordinates: 45°47′N 9°45′E
- Country: Italy
- Region: Lombardy
- Province: Province of Bergamo (BG)

Area
  - Total: 6.4 km^{2} (2.5 sq mi)
- Elevation: 960 m (3,150 ft)

Population (Dec. 2004)
  - Total: 2,045
  - Density: 320/km^{2} (830/sq mi)
- Demonym: Selvinesi
- Time zone: UTC+1 (CET)
  - Summer (DST): UTC+2 (CEST)
- Postal code: 24020
- Dialing code: 035
- Website: Official website

Selvino (Bergamasque: Selvì) is a comune (municipality) in the Province of Bergamo in the Italian region of Lombardy, located about 60 kilometres (37 mi) northeast of Milan and about 11 kilometres (7 mi) northeast of Bergamo. As of 31 December 2004, it had a population of 2,045 and an area of 6.4 square kilometres (2.5 mi^{2}).

Selvino borders the following municipalities: Albino, Algua, Aviatico, Nembro.

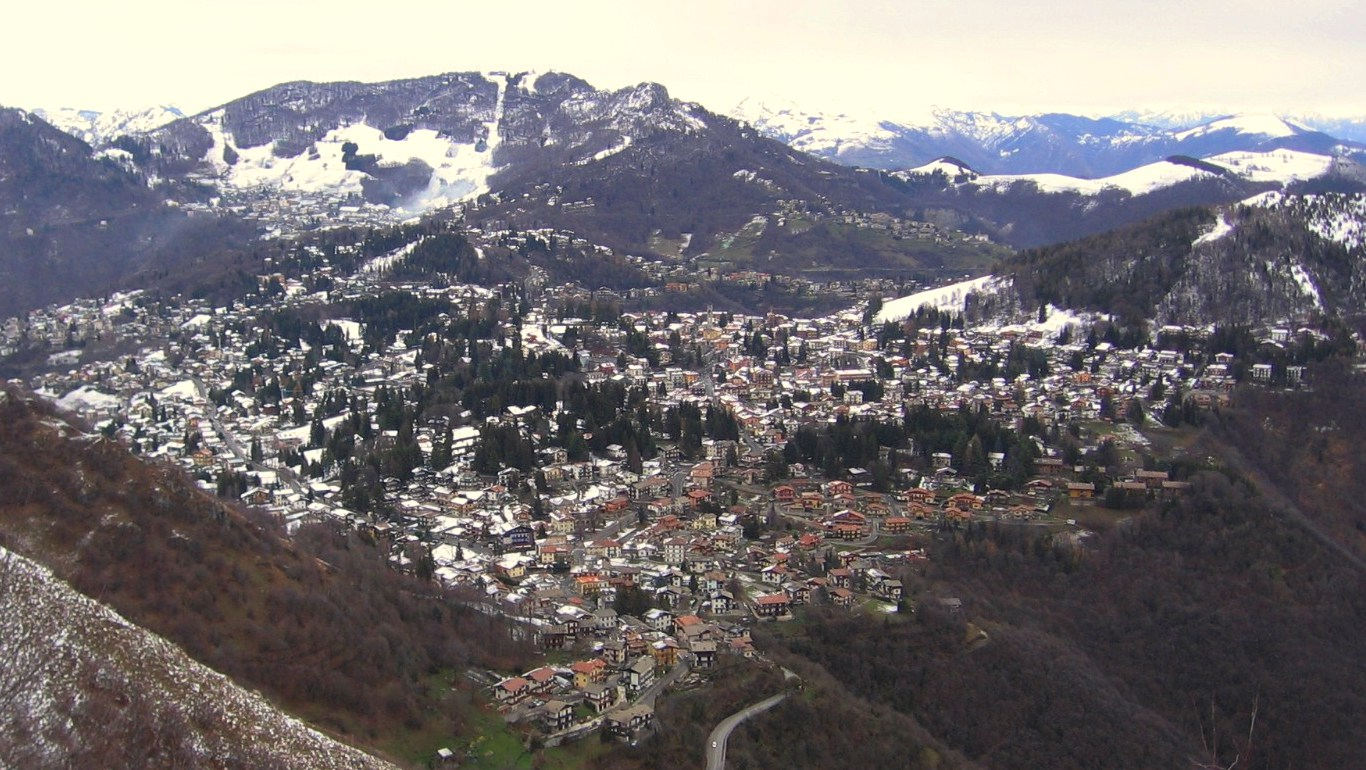
Selvino plateau seen from Mount Podona

== Demographic evolution ==
Historical population

Year	Pop.	±%
1861	469	—
1871	484	+3.2%
1881	583	+20.5%
1901	700	+20.1%
1911	853	+21.9%

Year	Pop.	±%
1921	858	+0.6%
1931	1,025	+19.5%
1936	1,101	+7.4%
1951	1,327	+20.5%
1961	1,476	+11.2%

Year	Pop.	±%
1971	1,684	+14.1%
1981	1,837	+9.1%
1991	1,837	+0.0%
2001	2,011	+9.5%

Source: Data from ISTAT

== See also ==
- Selvino children
