= Giuseppe Antonio Orelli =

Swiss-Italian painter

Giuseppe Antonio Felice Orelli, also referred to as Giovanni Antonio, (13 February 1700 or 1706- died after 1776 ), was a Swiss-Italian painter, mainly of sacred subjects, active in a late Baroque style.

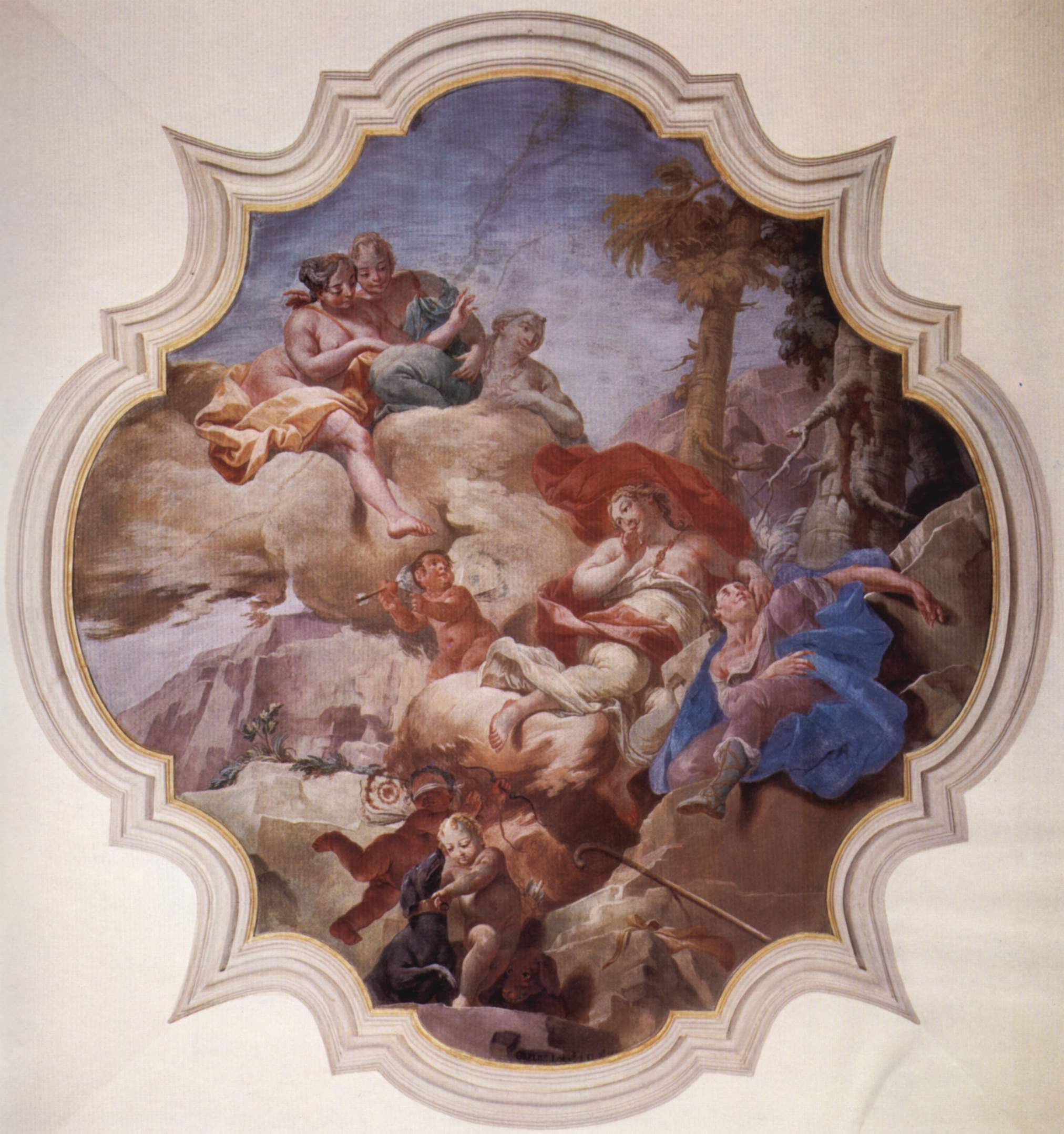
Mythologic Fresco

== Biography ==
He was born in Locarno in the Ticino, but active also in Milan and Bergamo. He studied in Milan under Giovanni Battista Sassi, a pupil of Francesco Solimena. He painted for the church of San Bartolomeo in Bergamo. He is the son of the painter Baldassare Orelli. He is the father of Vicenzo Angelo, who was also a painter in Bergamo.
