= Sanctuary of Maria Santissima Regina, Zogno =

Catholic church in Bergamo province, Italy

Coordinates: 45°47′31.8″N 9°38′46.7″E

The Santuario di Maria Santissima Regina or Sanctuary of Mary Holiest Queen is a late-20th-century Roman Catholic church located on Via Antonio Locatelli just outside the center of the town of Zogno, province of Bergamo, region of Lombardy, Italy.

== History ==
The church, dedicated to the Virgin Mary, was designed in 1958–1962, and construction was carried out using iron-reinforced concrete from 1962 to 1966. The project was designed by Enzo Lauletta, and construction completed by the architect Vito Sonzogni. The construction was patronized by the local Monsignor Giuseppe Speranza. The asymmetric rhomboid structure with a diagonal roof has a tapering bell-tower standing alongside.

The interior have mosaic windows by Francesco Taragni and a wooden tabernacle by Claudio Nani.
