= Antonio Pietro Cortinovis =

Venerable Antonio Pietro Cortinovis OFMCap
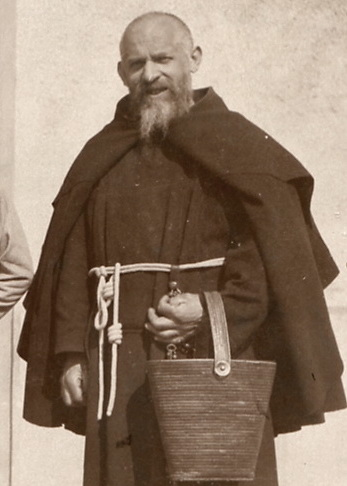
- Cortinovis in 1938
- Born: 7 November 1885; Costa Serina, Bergamo, Kingdom of Italy
- Died: 10 April 1984 (aged 98); Bergamo, Italy

Antonio Pietro Cortinovis (7 November 1885 – 10 April 1984), religious name Cecilio Maria da Costa Serina, was a Lombard from the Capuchin friar. He had set his heart on entering the religious life despite his initial reluctance due to him pondering on his unworthiness. This belief manifested in his childhood which motivated him to decide against entering the priesthood. But his religious formation in the order was pushed back due to World War I and he was unable to make his perpetual vows until the war had concluded.

Cortinovis served as a porter and beggar for the order in their convent in Milan and remained there until his death. He established the Opera San Francesco in 1959 in order to work with the poor and was a foundation that earned the support of the Archbishop of Milan (and future pope) Giovanni Battista Montini. The beatification process opened in Milan in 1993. Pope Francis confirmed his heroic virtue and named him as Venerable on 6 March 2018.

== Life ==
Antonio Pietro Cortinovis was born on 7 November 1885 in Costa Serina in Bergamo as the seventh of nine children to the peasants Lorenzo Cortinovis and Angela Gherardi (who was born to Giacomo in Trafficanti). His parents were married in 1870. The preceding sibling Margherita died just after her birth. Father Pietro Rota baptized him on 8 November in the church of Santi Lorenzo martire e Ambrogio.

From his childhood he had a strong love and devotion to both the Eucharist and the Passion. He had often described his father as being rather reserved and sensitive and received his religious formation from his mother. From age six he began attending confession and he received the sacrament of Confirmation on 10 August 1892 before receiving his First Communion on 7 April 1896.

Cortonovis never desired being an altar server in his childhood and perceived great unworthiness on his part in becoming a priest. This became the reason that he was never to become a priest. But after he did his schooling the idea to enter the religious life as a friar came to him and grew over time. In 1899 he entered the Third Order of Saint Francis and later in 1901 confessed to the friar Teodosio da Samarate (who came to the town to preach) of his desire to enter the religious life. Teodosio encouraged him and invited him to become a friar.

Before he turned 23 he worked as both a shepherd and as a lumberjack. Cortinovis entered the Order of Friars Minor Capuchin on 21 April 1908 after his father (who died not long after in January 1909) accompanied him to the convent in Bergamo. His mother and siblings wept upon his departure. He moved to the Sovere convent on 22 April 1908 before commencing his novitiate under the guidance of Gianfrancesco da Cascina Ferrara. Cortinovis was vested in the religious habit for the first time on 29 July 1908 and assumed the religious name Cecilio Maria.

Cortonovis began to fast and scourge himself after this and he later made his first vows on 2 August 1909. He spent time at the convent in Albino (from 10 August 1909 after his novitiate ended) before he was moved to the convent in Cremona on 17 February 1910. Cortinovis was later relocated to the order's convent in Milan on 29 April 1910.

In Milan he lived in the convent of Viale Piave and tended to the poor of the area and acted as the sacristan from November 1914 until 1921. In 1914 he contracted meningitis which almost killed him. But he was healed on 18 April 1914 (when it seemed he was about to die) after his confrere Girolamo da Lomazzo turned to the intercession of Innocenzo da Berzo for a miracle.

In July 1916 he was sent to the 5th Alpini Regiment in Tirano to reinforce the Stelvio Battalion on Mount Nero and regretted the fact that he was not allowed to wear his religious habit. But heart issues prompted a doctor's examination in November 1916 and he was discharged. Cortinovis made his solemn vows on 2 February 1918 and on 16 September 1921 was appointed as the porter for the convent.

Cortonovis dreamed of working in the missions in either Brazil or Africa and he wanted to spend his life helping Daniele da Samarate with the lepers in Brazil. At dawn on 5 July 1922 he was in his cell when Cortonovis saw a bright light and experienced a vision.

Cortinovis later established the Opera San Francesco in order to tend and minister to poor people. This project and its work received support from the Archbishop of Milan (and future pope) Giovanni Battista Montini. Cortinovis was also a close friend to the Bishop of Cesena Lino Esterino Garavaglia. In 1969 the Milanese authorities awarded him a silver medal for his work with the poor while the Lombard province granted him a gold medal for the same reason in 1970. His awards both made it into the press due to his reputation.

From August 1979 he began suffering from cardiac pains and often had a series of breathing difficulties due to respiratory tract complications. His superiors decided his work with the Opera San Francesco had to end so as for him to recover. Cortinovis did not wish to do this but relented with obedience. From 1981 he kept moving from Milan to the convent's hospital in Bergamo for treatment.

He died at 9:15 pm on 10 April 1984 in Bergamo with a smile on his face. The requiem was celebrated at the Bergamo convent before the solemn funeral Mass was celebrated at the Milanese convent where he had lived for most of his life. His remains were buried at Musocco but were later exhumed and relocated to the church of the Sacred Heart on 31 January 1989. His remains lie in the chapel of that church close to the porter's lodge.

== Beatfication process ==
The beatification process opened under Pope John Paul II on 1 July 1993 after the Congregation for the Causes of Saints titled Cortinovis as a Servant of God and issued the nihil obstat ("no objections") edict that initiated the cause. Cardinal Carlo Maria Martini oversaw the diocesan investigation into the late friar's life and virtues from 27 September 1993 until 10 April 1995. The Congregation validated the diocesan process in Rome on 22 March 1996 and later received the Positio dossier two decades later for assessment. Theologians assessed and approved the contents of the Positio in their meeting held on 6 February 2018. Pope Francis confirmed his heroic virtue and named him as venerable on 6 March 2018. The postulator for the cause is the Carlo Calloni OFMCap.
