= Nembro =

- Comune
- Comune di Nembro
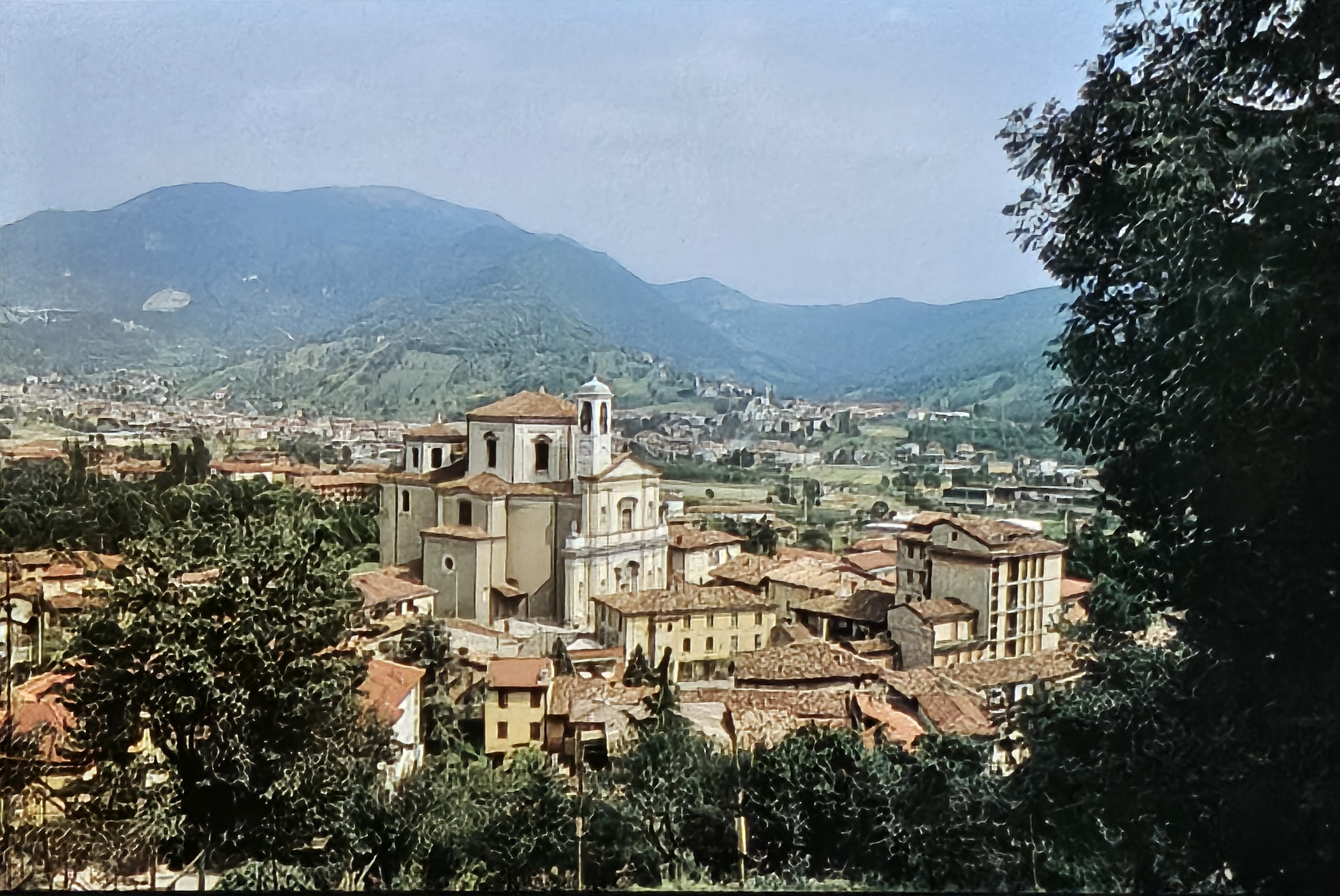
- Nembro

- Location within Italy Location within Lombardy
- Coordinates: 45°45′N 9°46′E
- Country: Italy
- Region: Lombardy
- Province: Bergamo (BG)
- Frazioni: Gavarno, Lonno, Salmezza, Trevasco Santissima Trinità, Viana, Trevasco San Vito

Government
  - Mayor: Gianfranco Ravasio

Area
  - Total: 15.24 km^{2} (5.88 sq mi)
- Elevation: 309 m (1,014 ft)

Population (30 February 2026)
  - Total: 11,281
  - Density: 740.2/km^{2} (1,917/sq mi)
- Demonym: Nembresi
- Time zone: UTC+1 (CET)
  - Summer (DST): UTC+2 (CEST)
- Postal code: 24027
- Dialing code: 035
- Patron saint: Saint Martin
- Saint day: November 11
- Website: Official website

Nembro (Bergamasque: Nèmber) is a comune (municipality) in the Province of Bergamo in the Italian region of Lombardy, located about 60 kilometres (37 mi) northeast of Milan and about 10 kilometres (6 mi) northeast of Bergamo, on the right bank of the Serio River. Nembro borders the following municipalities: Albino, Algua, Alzano Lombardo, Pradalunga, Scanzorosciate, Selvino, Villa di Serio, Zogno.

== Place of religious interest ==
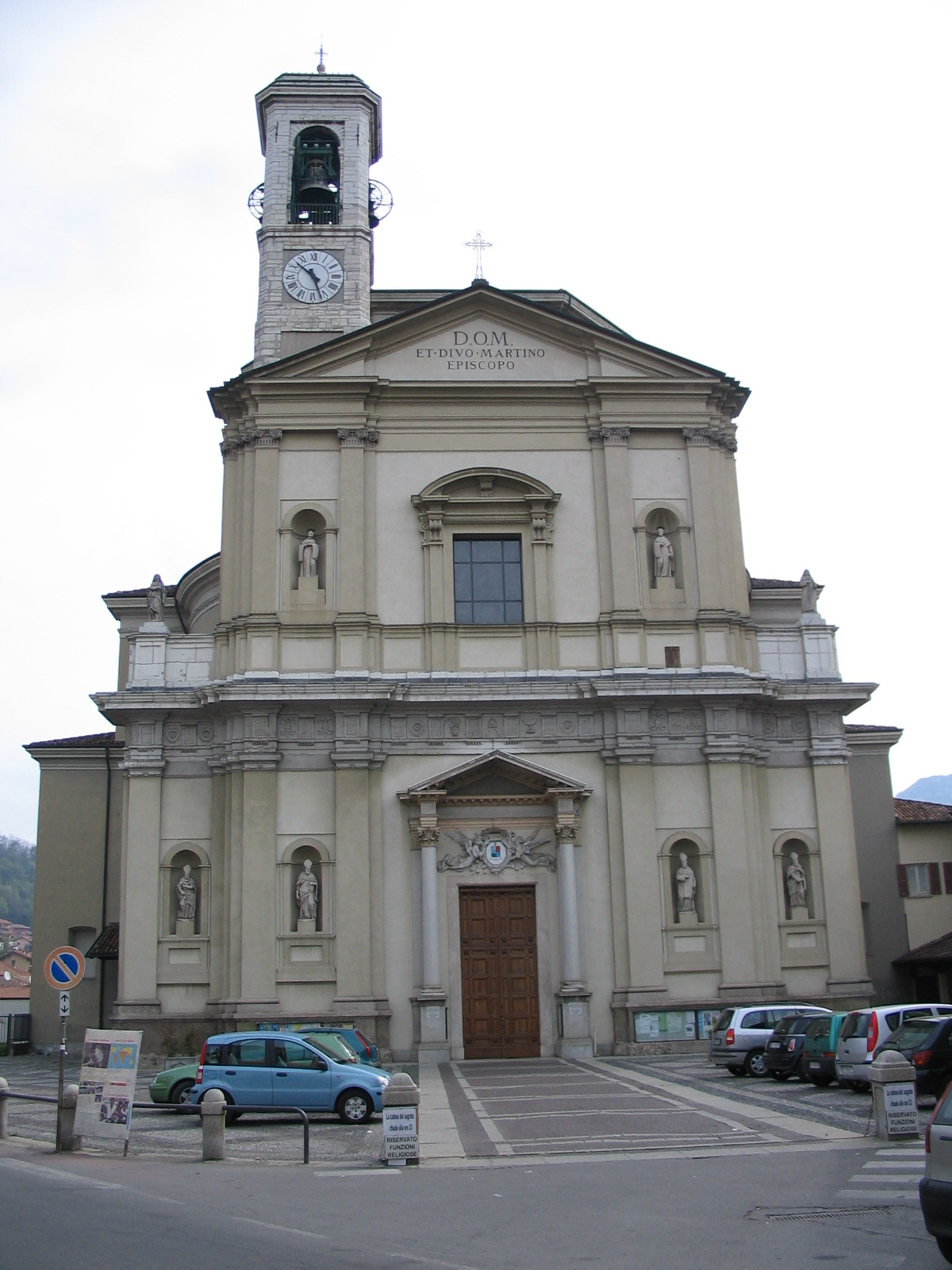
Pleban Archpresbyterial church dedicated to San Martino bishop

Nembro has covered since the V century a considerable religious importance. The Pleban Archpresbyterial church dedicated to San Martino bishop of Tours is proof of this. Built in 1424—but completely modified between 1752 and 1777 by the architect Luca Lucchini of Certenago—it houses 27 works by Enea Salmeggia. Among the other churches, are to be mentioned: the church of San Nicola da Tolentino (1512), with the annexed convent of the Augustinians, and the Sanctuary "Zuccarello", built on the site of a 15th-century fortress, housing frescoes from the 15th through 17th centuries.

== Into the nature ==
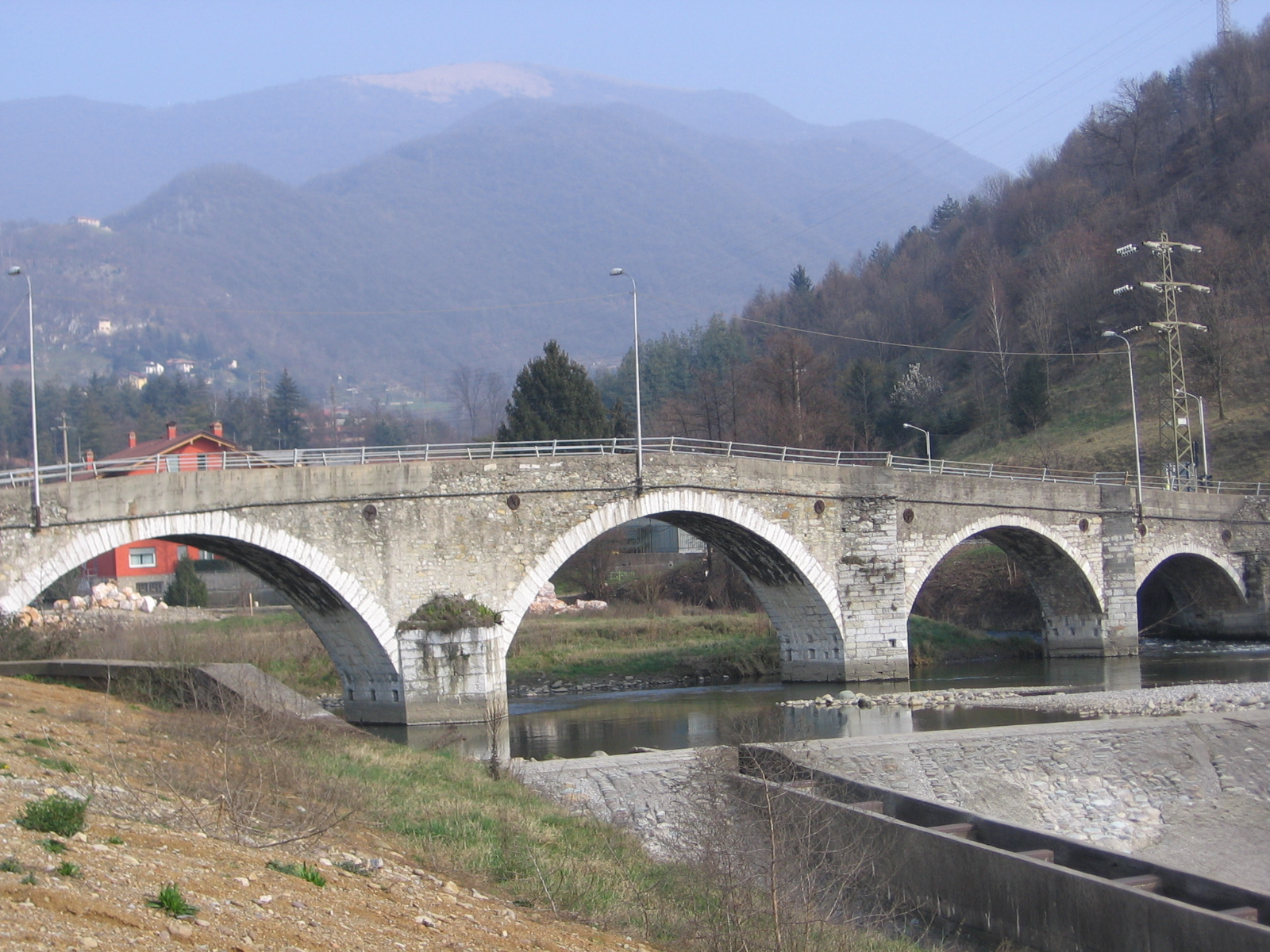
Bridge on the Serio River (1591), in Romanesque style

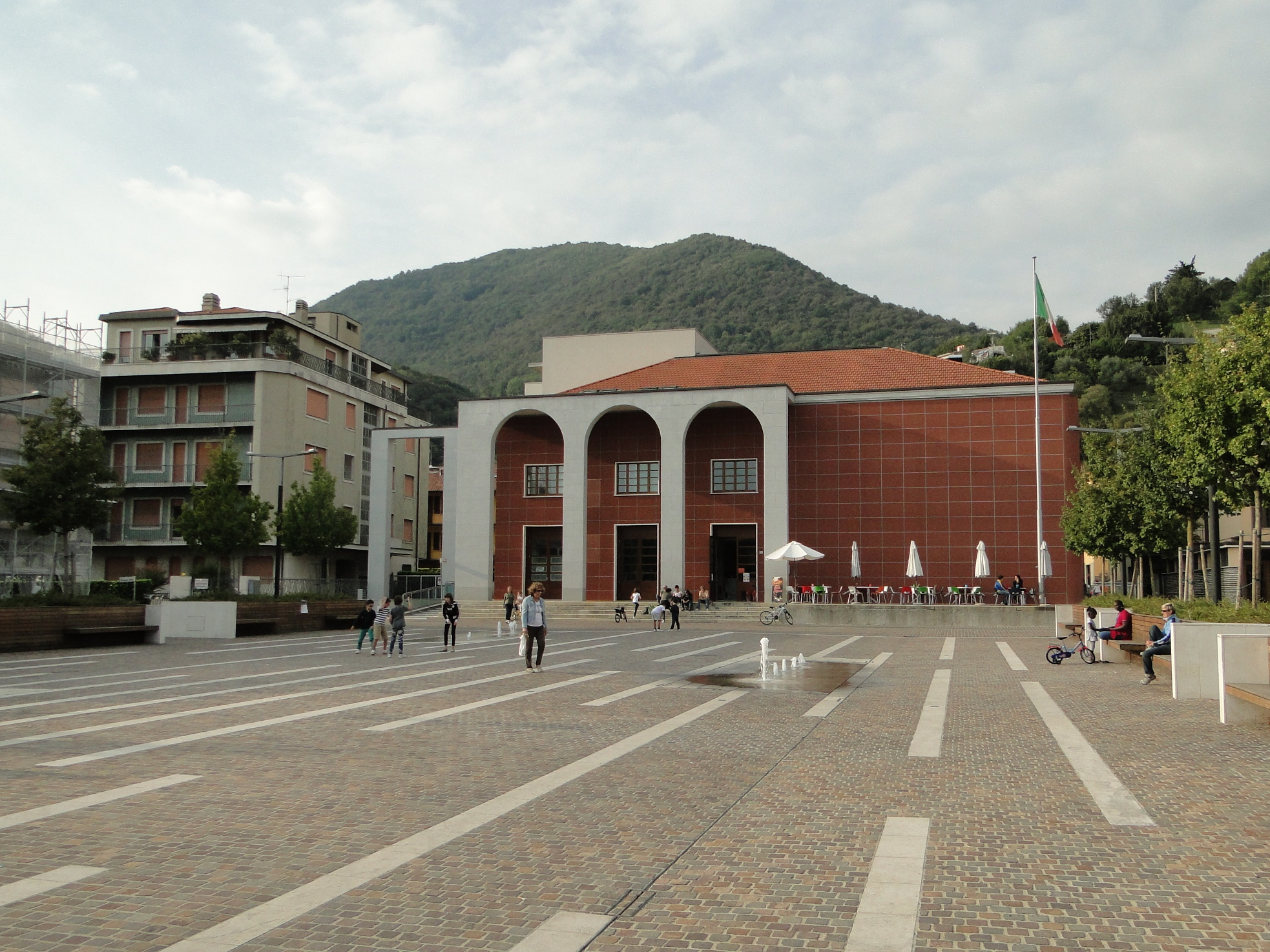
Piazza della Libertà, in front of the municipe

Concerning the naturalistic environment Nembro is full of paths on its municipal territory. Among these it is worth mentioning the paths that reache the Sanctuary of "Zuccarello", the Lonno hamlet and the surrounding mountains—included Cereto, Valtrosa, Podona and the villages of Selvino and Salmezza.

== Covid-19 pandemic ==
In 2020, Nembro—with Alzano Lombardo—was one of the main places at international level where the COVID-19 pandemic originated and spread, also favoured by the lack of adequate political containment resolutions to deal with an extremely serious health situation.

== Culture ==
=== Museums ===
Nembro has two museums:

- Museo Pietre Coti Valle Seriana (MUPIC), located in the former Bonorandi house, which collects documents related to the history of coti stones and reconstructing the living conditions of the workers in the past.
- Museo della Miniera, focused on the living conditions of miners and emigrants.

=== Foundations ===
These foundations are located in the town:

- The R.S.A. Casa di Riposo di Nembro Onlus and the Opera Pia Zilioli (kindergarten).
- The "Maria Antonietta Savoldi" Foundation created in 1957 by Renato Savoldi, which awards scholarships to university students.

==== Other charities ====
- Scholarships in memory of Cristina Birolini, a municipal convention also active for students from Albino, wanted by the husband of the deceased, Luigi, and her son Matteo Bergamelli.
