= Aviatico =

- Comune
- Comune di Aviatico
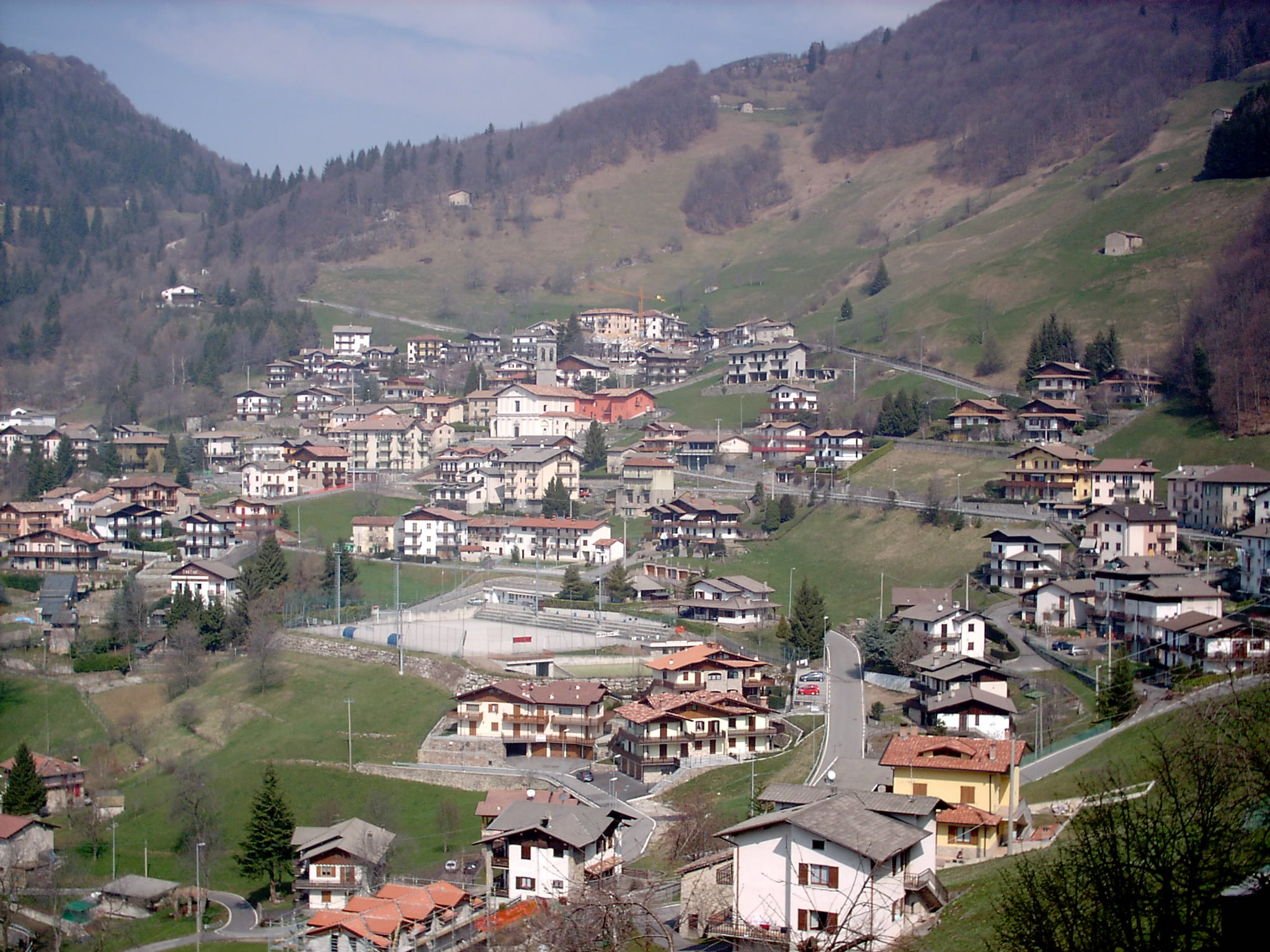
- View of Aviatico

- Coat of arms

- Location within Italy Location within Lombardy
- Coordinates: 45°47′N 9°46′E
- Country: Italy
- Region: Lombardy
- Province: Province of Bergamo (BG)
- Frazioni: Ama, Amora, Ganda

Area
  - Total: 8.4 km^{2} (3.2 sq mi)
- Elevation: 1,022 m (3,353 ft)

Population (Dec. 2004)
  - Total: 496
  - Density: 59/km^{2} (150/sq mi)
- Demonym: Aviatichesi
- Time zone: UTC+1 (CET)
  - Summer (DST): UTC+2 (CEST)
- Postal code: 24020
- Dialing code: 035

Aviatico (Bergamasque: Aviàdech) is a comune (municipality) in the Province of Bergamo in the Italian region of Lombardy, located about 60 kilometres (37 mi) northeast of Milan and about 12 kilometres (7 mi) northeast of Bergamo. As of 31 December 2007, it had a population of 515 and an area of 8.4 square kilometres (3.2 mi^{2}).

The municipality of Aviatico contains the frazioni (subdivisions, mainly villages and hamlets) Ama, Amora, and Ganda.

Aviatico borders the following municipalities: Albino, Algua, Costa di Serina, Gazzaniga, Selvino.

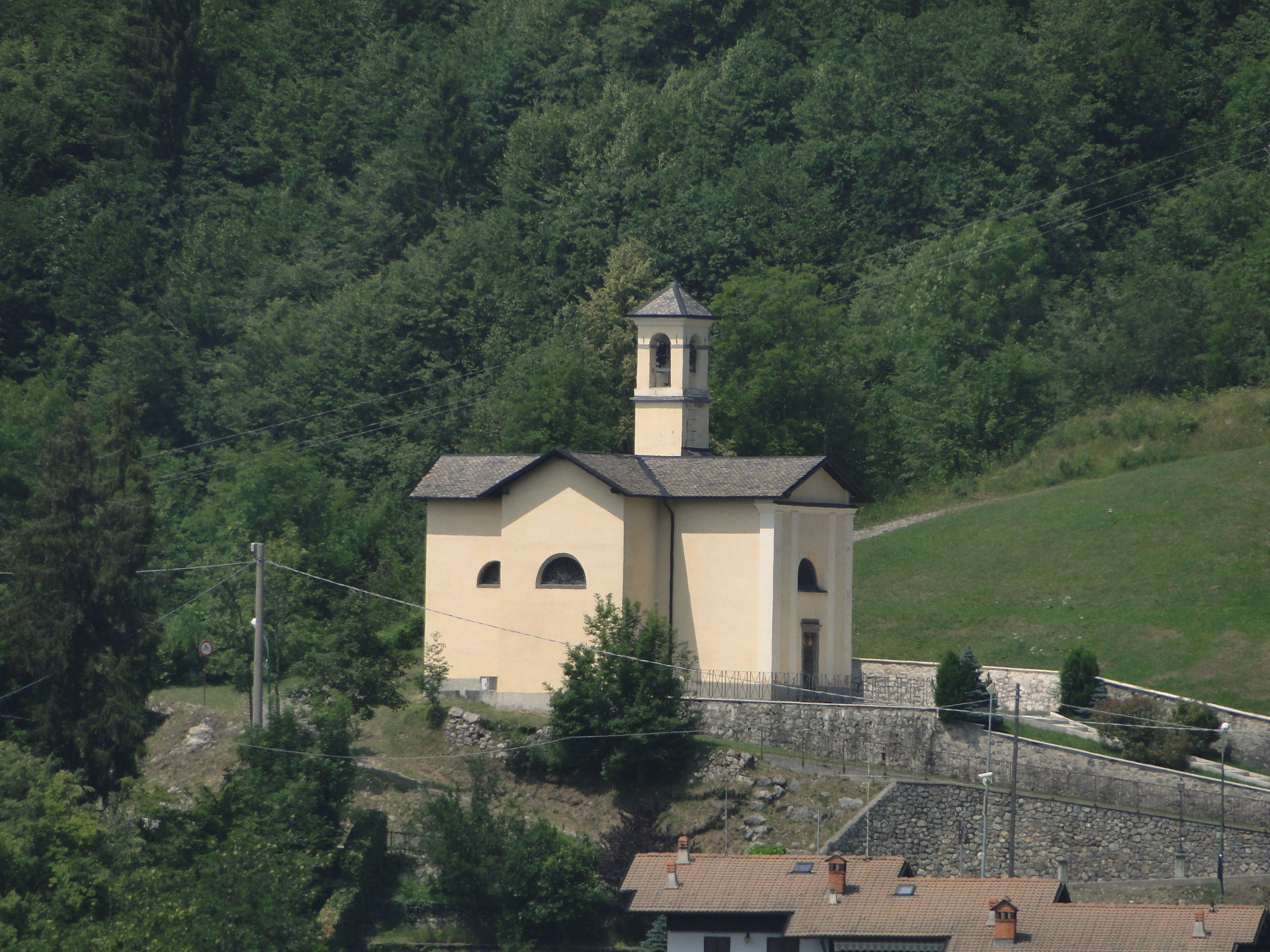
San Rocco sanctuary

== Demographic evolution ==
Historical population

Year	Pop.	±%
1861	589	—
1871	618	+4.9%
1881	611	−1.1%
1901	741	+21.3%
1911	798	+7.7%

Year	Pop.	±%
1921	877	+9.9%
1931	843	−3.9%
1936	800	−5.1%
1951	784	−2.0%
1961	662	−15.6%

Year	Pop.	±%
1971	514	−22.4%
1981	490	−4.7%
1991	506	+3.3%
2001	488	−3.6%

Source: Data from ISTAT
