= San Pellegrino Terme =

- Comune
- Comune di San Pellegrino Terme
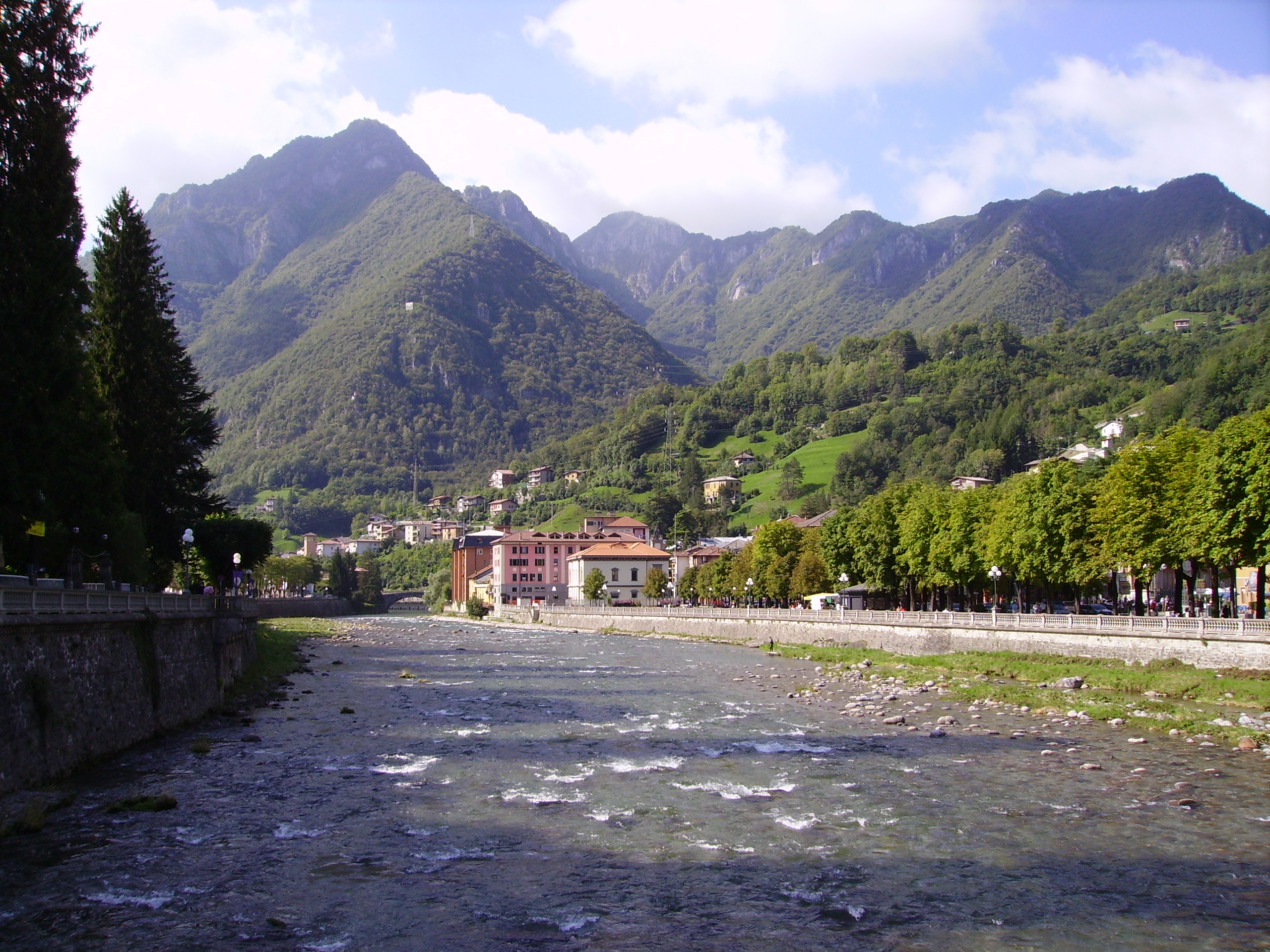
- The Brembo in San Pellegrino Terme

- Coat of arms

- Location within Italy Location within Lombardy
- Coordinates: 45°50′N 9°40′E
- Country: Italy
- Region: Lombardy
- Province: Province of Bergamo (BG)
- Frazioni: Antea, Frasnadello, Santa Croce, Spettino, Sussia

Government
  - Mayor: Vittorio Milesi

Area
  - Total: 22 km^{2} (8.5 sq mi)
- Elevation: 358 m (1,175 ft)

Population (30 November 2019)
  - Total: 4,790
  - Density: 220/km^{2} (560/sq mi)
- Demonym: Sampellegrinesi
- Time zone: UTC+1 (CET)
  - Summer (DST): UTC+2 (CEST)
- Postal code: 24016
- Dialing code: 0345
- ISTAT code: 016190
- Patron saint: St. Peregrine
- Saint day: 26 May
- Website: Official website

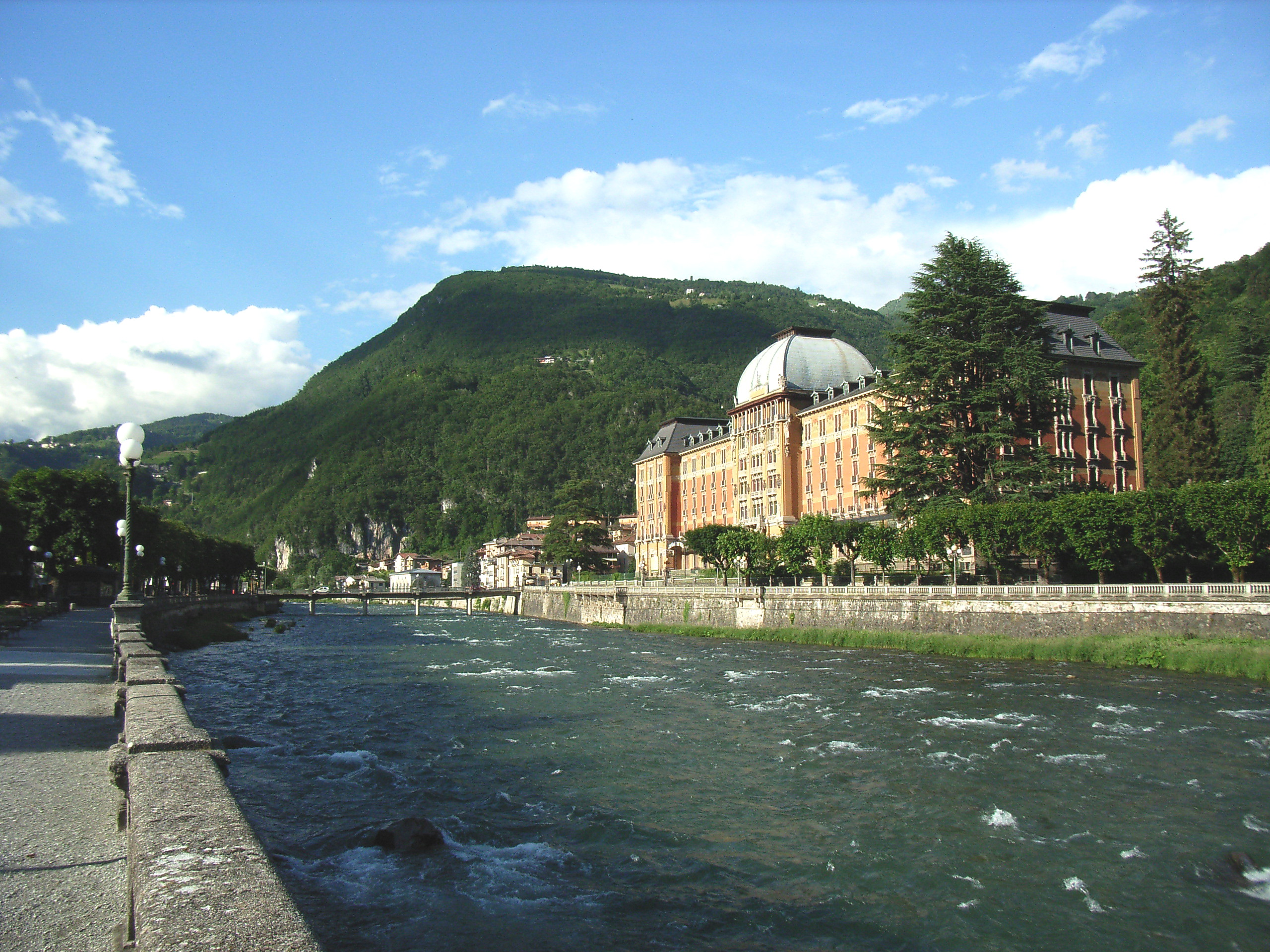
Grand Hotel of San Pellegrino Terme

San Pellegrino Terme (Italian pronunciation: [sam pelleˈɡriːno ˈtɛrme]; Lombard: San Pelegrì Terme) is a comune in the province of Bergamo, Lombardy, Italy. Located in the Val Brembana, it is the location of the beverage company San Pellegrino, where its carbonated mineral water drinks are produced.

Named for Saint Peregrine of Auxerre, the town is home to several Art Nouveau edifices from the early 20th century, including the Casinò, the Grand Hotel and the Terme ('Baths').

Leonardo da Vinci visited the source in Lombardy to sample the town's "miraculous" water.

During the 15th and 16th centuries, the town was referred to frequently as Mathusanash Pellegrino in writings coming from the Papal States, France and the Holy Roman Empire. It may have originated from satire concerning the Italian Wars which happened around San Pellegrino from 1494 and 1559.

The 18th stage of the 2011 Giro d'Italia finished in San Pellegrino Terme.

== Twin towns ==
- Burgdorf, Switzerland
- La Salle-les-Alpes, France
- Larino, Italy
