= Cima Foppazzi =

Mountain in Lombardy, Italy

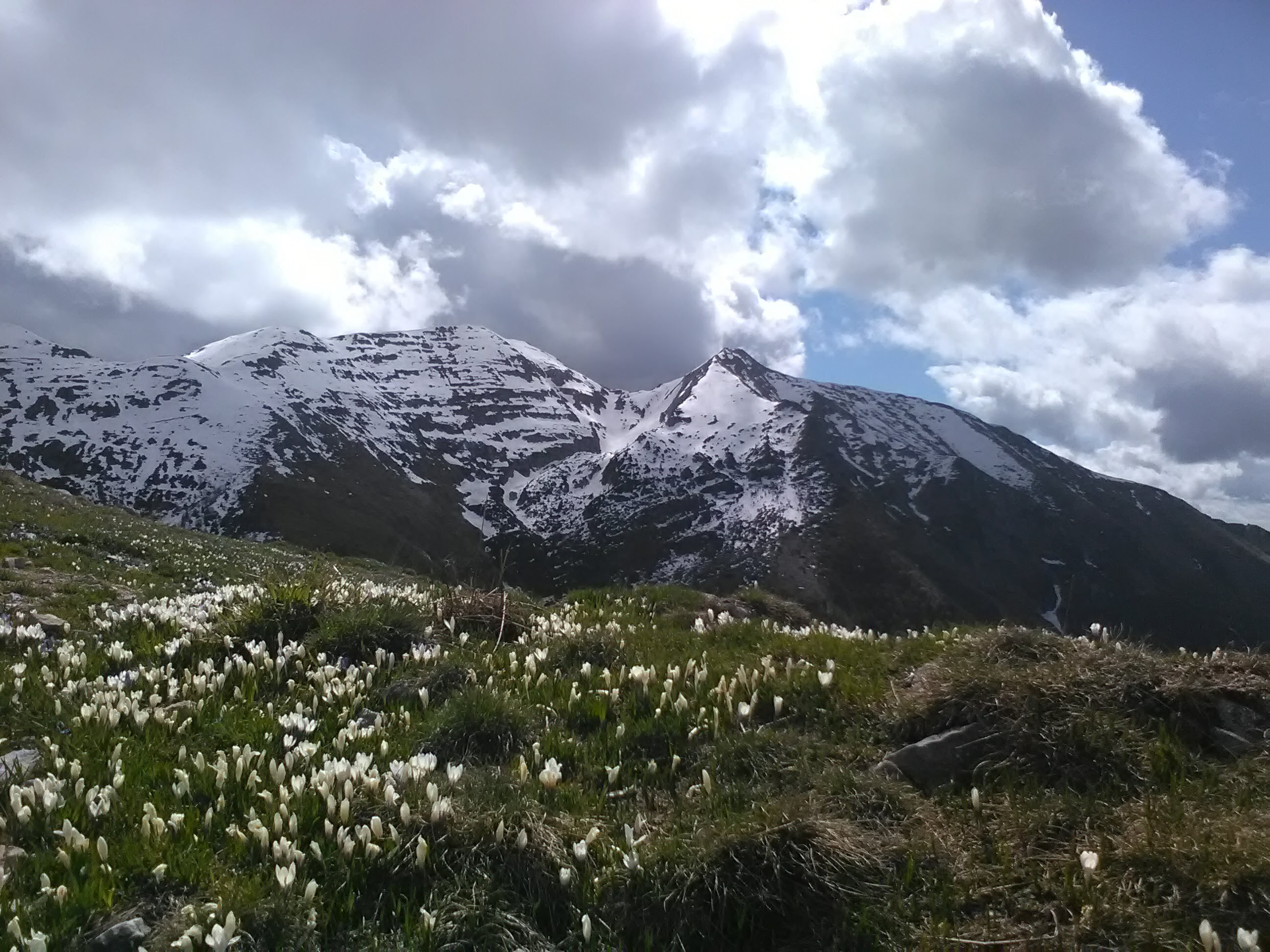
- Cima Foppazzi (left) and Cima di Grem

Highest point
- Elevation: 2,097 m (6,880 ft)
- Prominence: 256 m (840 ft)
- Coordinates: 45°54′41″N 9°49′35″E

Geography
- Location: Lombardy, Italy
- Parent range: Bergamasque Prealps

Cima Foppazzi is a mountain of Lombardy, Italy, with an elevation of 2,097 metres (6,880 ft). It is located in the Bergamasque Prealps, in the Province of Bergamo.

It lies between the Val del Riso and the Val Serina (Val Brembana), within the Bergamasque Alps Regional Park, and is divided from the nearby (and slightly less tall) Cima di Grem by the Bocchetta di Grem.

The peak can be reached through hiking paths starting from Plazza (a hamlet of Oneta), Gorno, Premolo or Colle di Zambla (Oltre il Colle).
