= Cima di Grem =

Mountain in Lombardy, Italy

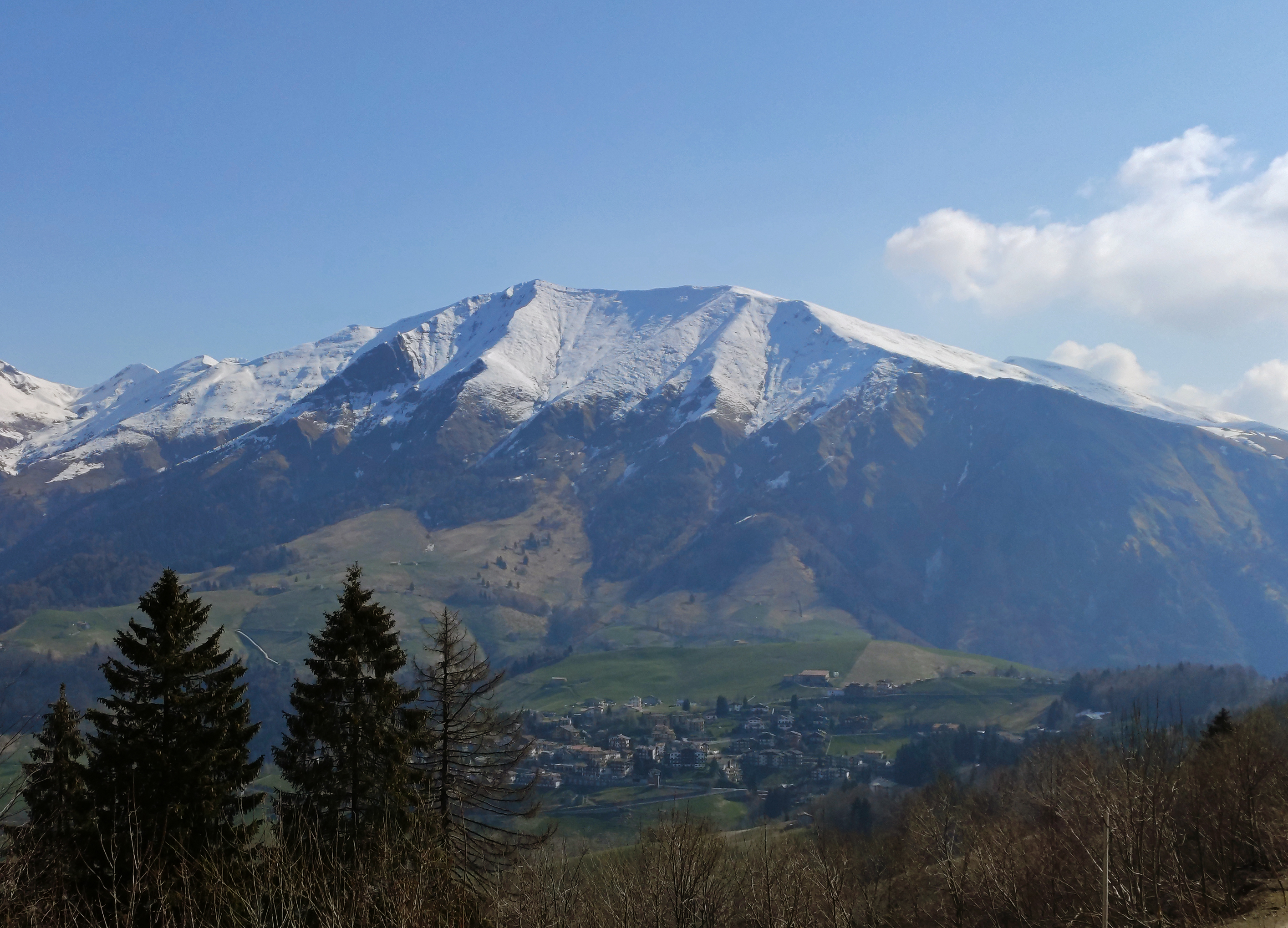

Highest point
- Elevation: 2,049 m (6,722 ft)
- Coordinates: 45°54′28″N 9°49′20″E

Geography
- Location: Lombardy, Italy
- Parent range: Bergamasque Prealps

Cima di Grem, also known as Monte Grem, is a mountain of Lombardy, Italy, with an elevation of 2,049 metres (6,722 ft). It is located in the Bergamasque Prealps, in the Province of Bergamo, between the Val del Riso and the Val Serina (a side valley of the Val Brembana).

== Details ==
The mountain is located within the municipalities of Oltre il Colle, Oneta, Premolo and Gorno, and is divided from the nearby Cima Foppazzi by the Bocchetta di Grem. From the Roman age to the second half of the 20th century, it was mined for calamine, sphalerite and lead.

Today, Cima di Grem is a hiking destination which can be reached from Plazza (a hamlet of Oneta), Gorno, or Colle di Zambla. Several mountain huts are located on its slopes, such as Baita Alpe Grem (1,098 m), Baita Mistri (1,790 m), and Bivacco Tellini (1,647 m).

Most of the mountain lies within the Bergamasque Alps Regional Park.
