= Gorno (disambiguation) =

Gorno may refer to:

- Gorno, a comune (municipality) in the Province of Bergamo in the Italian region Lombardy
- "Gorno", a combination of the words "gore" and "porn" used to describe a type of splatter film
