= Giubiana =

Traditional festival celebrated in the north of Italy

The Giubiana is a traditional celebration having great popularity in the northern Italian region of Lombardy, and particularly in Brianza, as well as in the region of Piedmont. During the last Thursday in January, bonfires are lit, on which the Giubiana (i.e. a puppet of an old witch) is burnt.

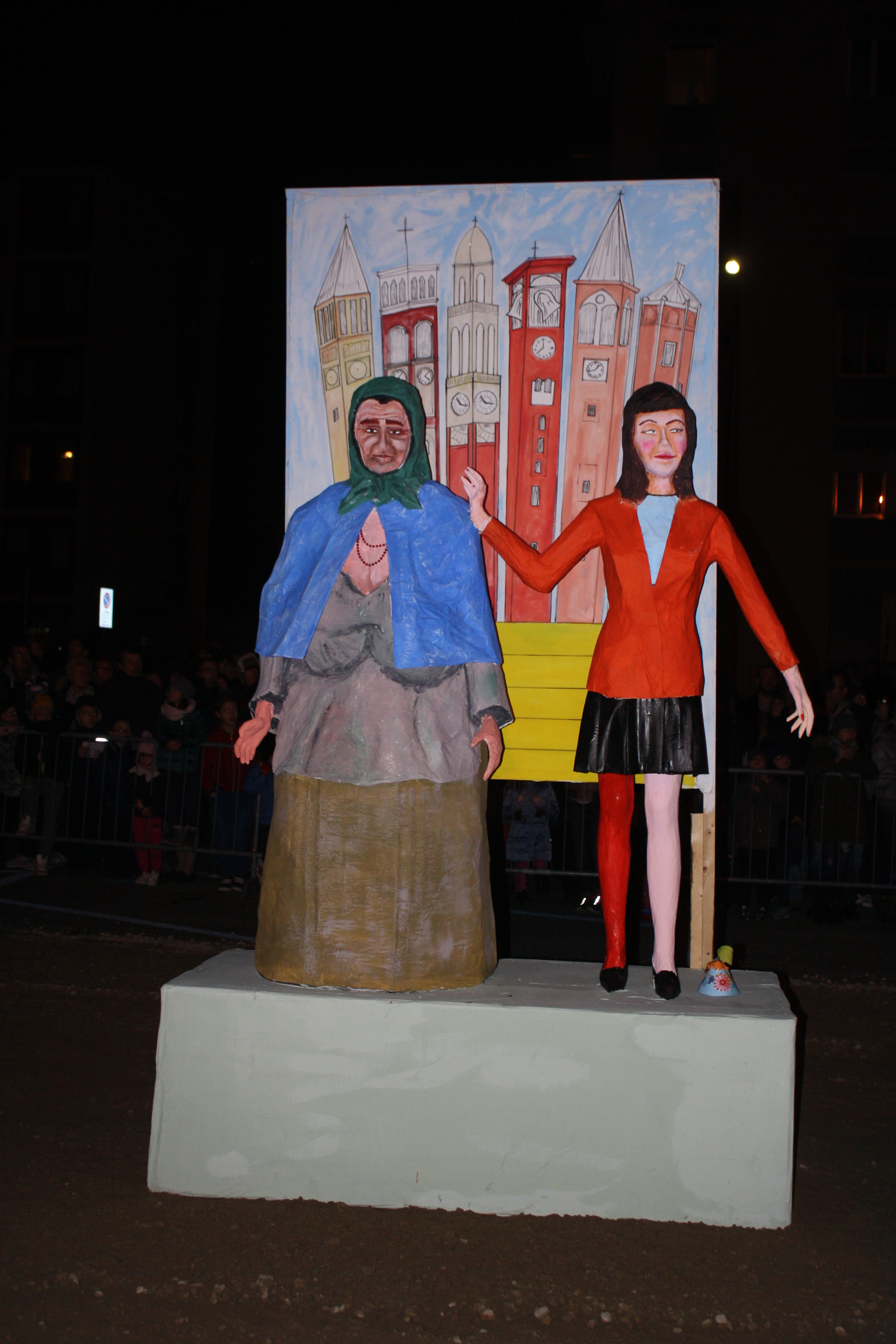
Example of Giöbia in Busto Arsizio

== The name ==
The name of this witch, and of the festival, changes according to the different languages spoken in these regions:

- Giubiana in northern Brianza
- Gibiana in southern Brianza
- Giöbia/Gioeubia in the province of Varese
- Giòbia e Giobiassa in Piedmont

According to some, she is named after the ancient Roman God Jupiter, and this is why celebrations are held on Thursdays (in Anglo-Saxon tradition the day of Thor, but in the Latin tradition the day of Jupiter). Furthermore, according to popular traditions, on Thursday nights (or Saturday nights) witches assembled for Sabbath.

== The festivity ==
In the days before the festival the villagers collect all that's combustible (wood, hay, paper etc.), and put a pyre together. After a procession through the village street, the Giubiana is placed on the pyre and set on fire. The rite is both symbolic and propitiatory. The Giubiana is burnt to ashes to terminate the winter, so that the pyre flame is believed to predict an abundant harvest in the upcoming year.

In some parts of eastern Brianza, the Giubiana is accompanied by a masculine character, the Ginée, her husband and the personification of January.

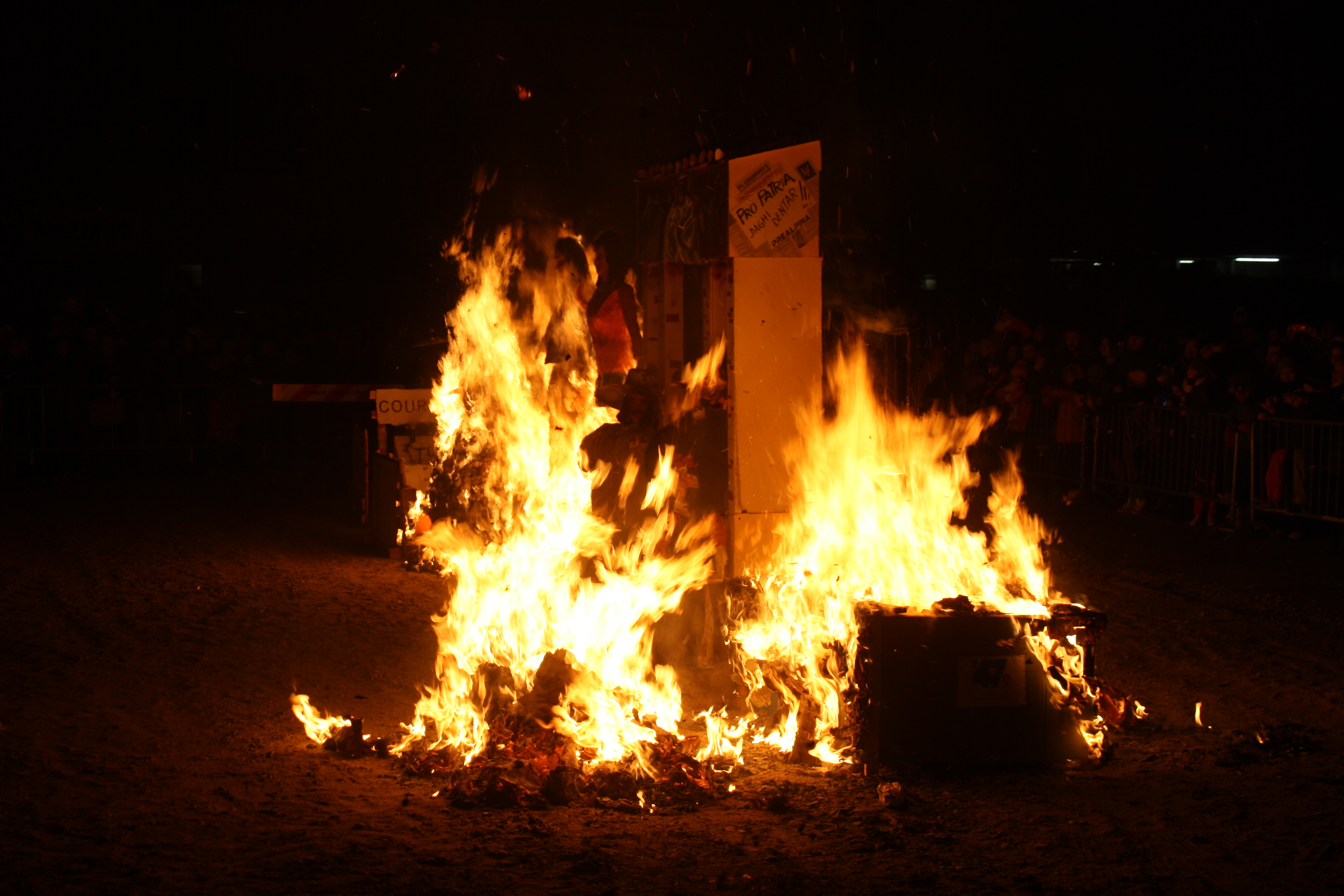
A Giöbia burning

In Canzo the celebration is particularly well-constructed; other symbolic and traditional characters are seen during the procession along historic centre, for example Anguana (a Celtic water fairy), the Òmm selvadech (the Wild Man), the Bear and the Hunter, the Executioner, the Candelabrum-bearers, the 'Bun e Gramm' (good boys and bad boys, that are pro and contra the burning), the so-called Lawyer of the Lost Causes (from Milan forum), the soothsayer, the Scarenna men, the Woman of the Street, the historical Firemen, the Shepherd, the Woodsman, the Carriage of the Peasants, the Sledge, and others. The "Cumpagnia di Nost" organizes the festivity, in which the town is adorned with black and red hangings (for mourning and bonfire); the symbol of the festivity is the red leg of the Giubiana; also the music of the drums and of the baghèt (lombard bagpipe) is mournful, but after burning it becomes cheerful because the evil has been eliminated; traditional costumes are worn. The atmosphere is sacral and joyful, thanks to the Celtic and Christian symbolism.

In Busto Arsizio the tradition is similar but different in only one point; the characters are prepared months before the festivity, the main reason is to create perfectly the exact face and body of all the characters, the Giubiana is the most important festivity in Busto Arsizio due to its historical meaning, or as many people say, the ceremony takes place in the center of the city just to hunt the bad luck and then celebrate the moment of good luck.
Since a few years, one of the groups who prepare their own Giubiana, the "Giovani padani" group, a political movement related to the right-wing party Lega Nord, have started creating politicised characters containing propaganda messages and offences to other parties and politicians, which have nothing to do with the traditional celebration of the end of the winter.

== Sources ==
- Montorfano, Giancarlo; Ariel Macchi (2000). Una storia della Giubiana. La Vita Felice. ISBN 88-7799-090-2.
