= Cornalba =

- Comune
- Comune di Cornalba
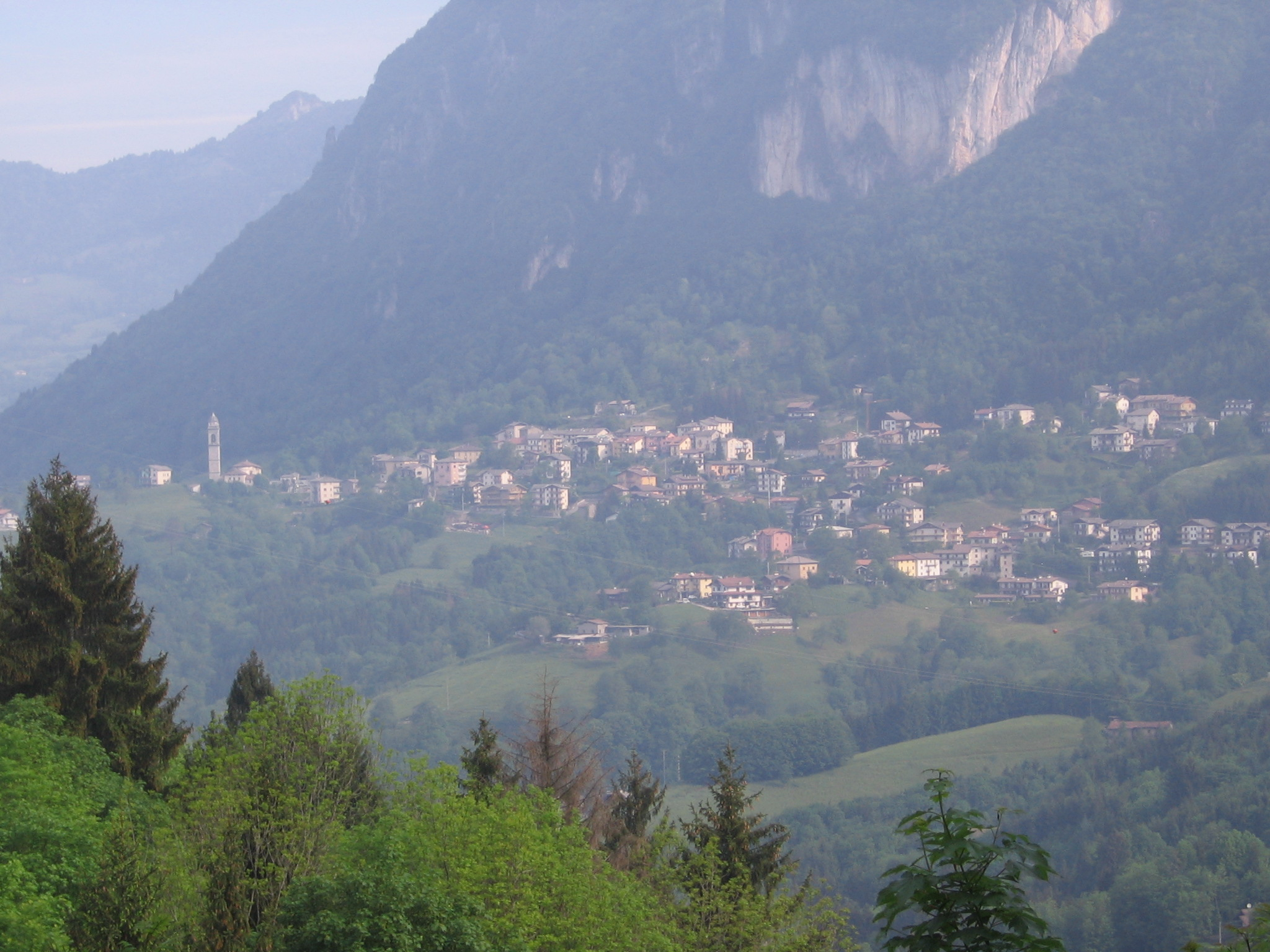
- Cornalba

- Location within Italy Location within Lombardy
- Coordinates: 45°51′N 9°45′E
- Country: Italy
- Region: Lombardy
- Province: Province of Bergamo (BG)
- Frazioni: Passoni

Area
  - Total: 9.4 km^{2} (3.6 sq mi)
- Elevation: 893 m (2,930 ft)

Population (31 Dec. 2010)
  - Total: 310
  - Density: 33/km^{2} (85/sq mi)
- Demonym: Cornalbesi
- Time zone: UTC+1 (CET)
  - Summer (DST): UTC+2 (CEST)
- Postal code: 24017
- Dialing code: 0345

Cornalba is a comune (municipality) in the Province of Bergamo in the Italian region of Lombardy, located about 60 kilometres (37 mi) northeast of Milan and about 20 kilometres (12 mi) northeast of Bergamo. As of 31 December 2010, it had a population of 310 and an area of 9.4 square kilometres (3.6 mi^{2}).

The municipality of Cornalba contains the frazione (subdivision) Passoni.

Cornalba borders the following municipalities: Costa di Serina, Gazzaniga, Oltre il Colle, Oneta, Serina, Vertova.

== Demographic evolution ==
Historical population

Year	Pop.	±%
1861	233	—
1871	274	+17.6%
1881	274	+0.0%
1901	330	+20.4%
1911	367	+11.2%

Year	Pop.	±%
1921	399	+8.7%
1931	424	+6.3%
1936	244	−42.5%
1951	368	+50.8%
1961	358	−2.7%

Year	Pop.	±%
1971	282	−21.2%
1981	295	+4.6%
1991	298	+1.0%
2001	287	−3.7%

Source: Data from ISTAT

== Twin towns ==
Cornalba is twinned with:

- Saint-Hilaire-de-Brens, France (1998)
