= Cazzano Sant'Andrea =

- Comune
- Comune di Cazzano Sant'Andrea
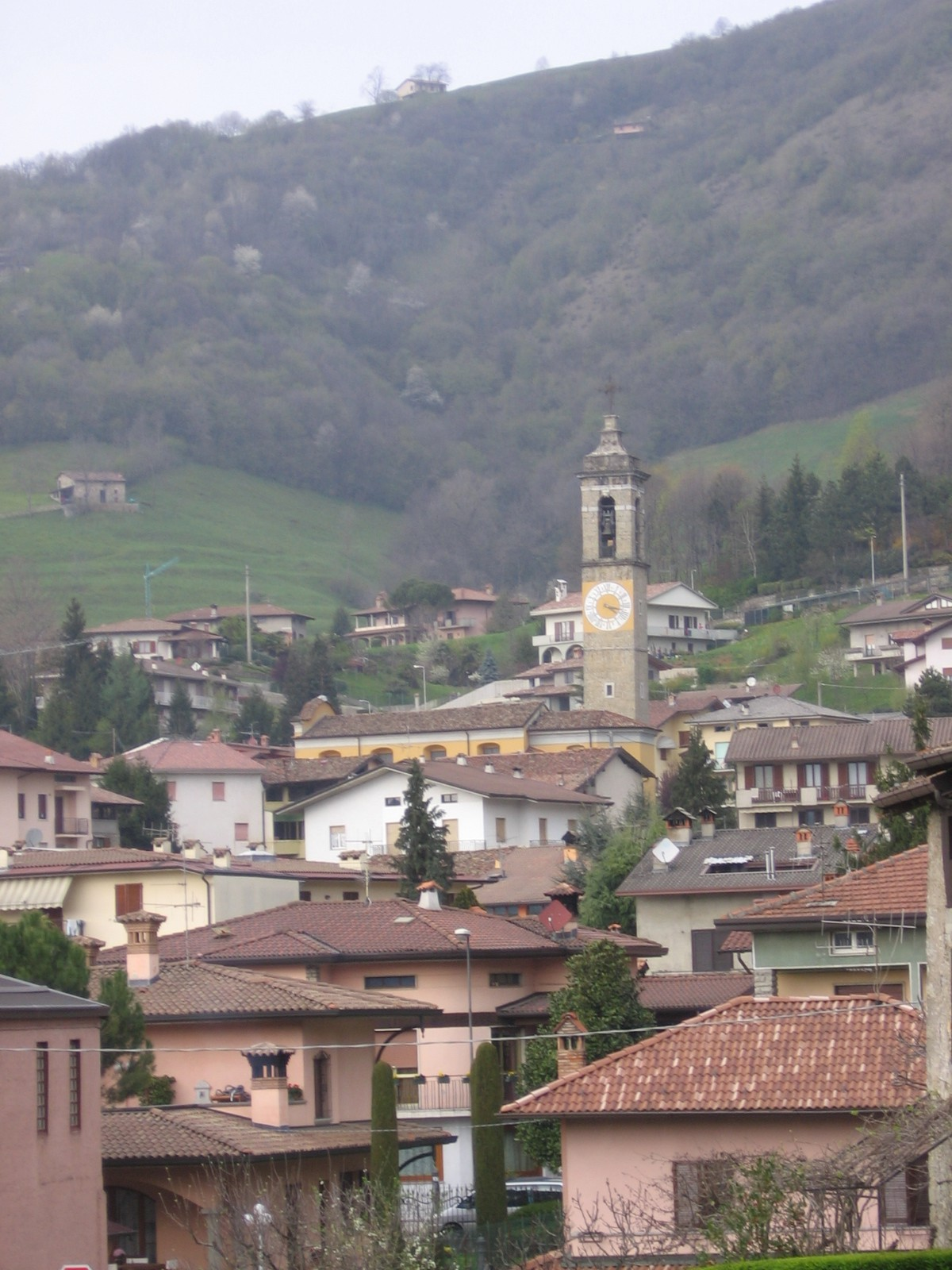
- Cazzano Sant'Andrea

- Location within Italy Location within Lombardy
- Coordinates: 45°49′N 9°53′E
- Country: Italy
- Region: Lombardy
- Province: Bergamo (BG)
- Frazioni: Melgarolo

Government
  - Mayor: Sergio Spampatti

Area
  - Total: 2.02 km^{2} (0.78 sq mi)
- Elevation: 504 m (1,654 ft)

Population (30 April 2017)
  - Total: 1,683
  - Density: 833/km^{2} (2,160/sq mi)
- Demonym: Cazzanesi
- Time zone: UTC+1 (CET)
  - Summer (DST): UTC+2 (CEST)
- Postal code: 24024
- Dialing code: 035
- Website: Official website

Cazzano Sant'Andrea (Bergamasque: Cazzà) is a comune (municipality) in the Province of Bergamo in the Italian region of Lombardy, located about 70 kilometres (43 mi) northeast of Milan and about 20 kilometres (12 mi) northeast of Bergamo.

Cazzano Sant'Andrea borders the following municipalities: Casnigo, Cene, Gandino, Leffe.

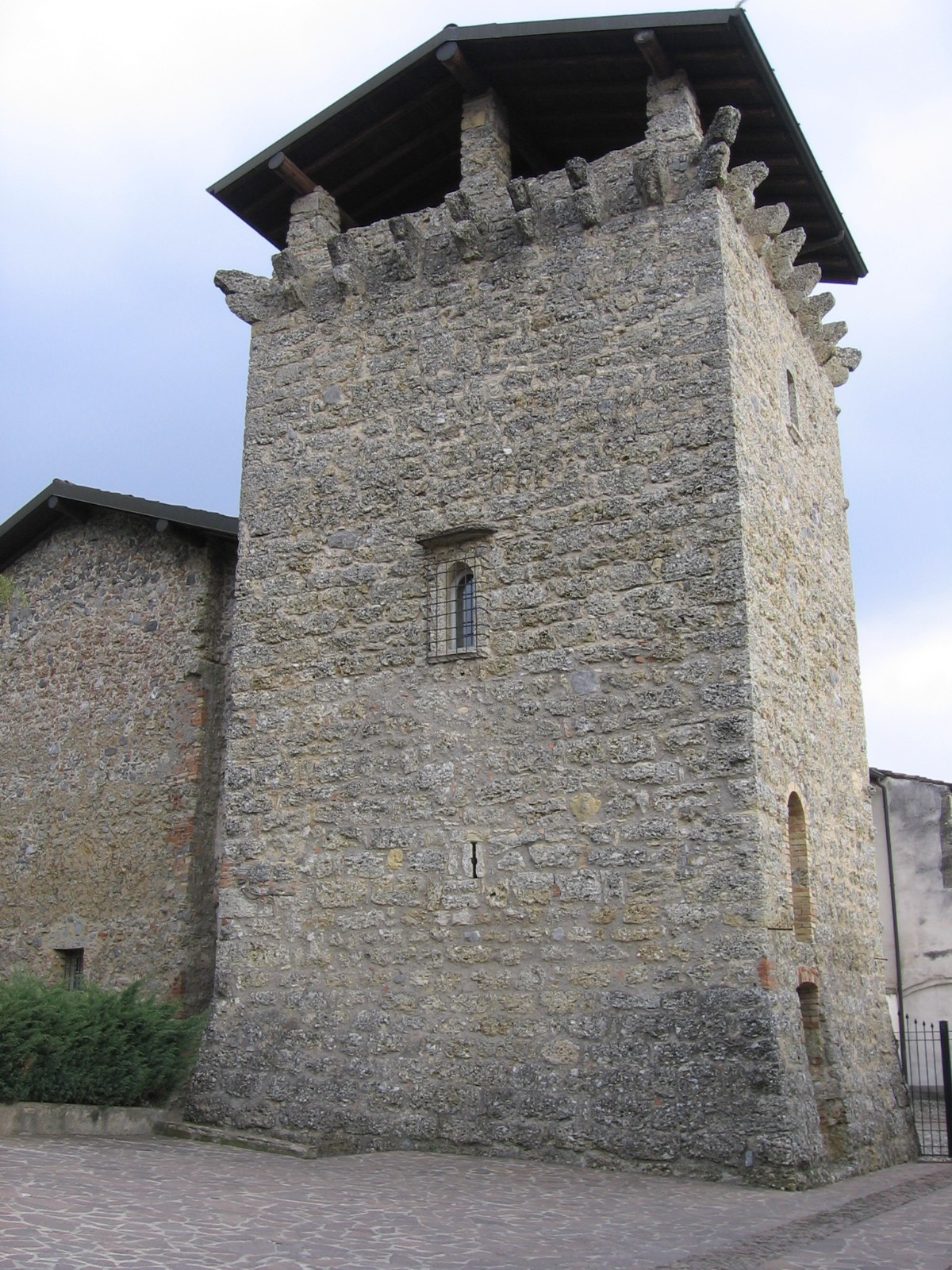
Medieval tower

== See also ==
- Lake Leffe
