= Gazzaniga =

- Comune
- Comune di Gazzaniga
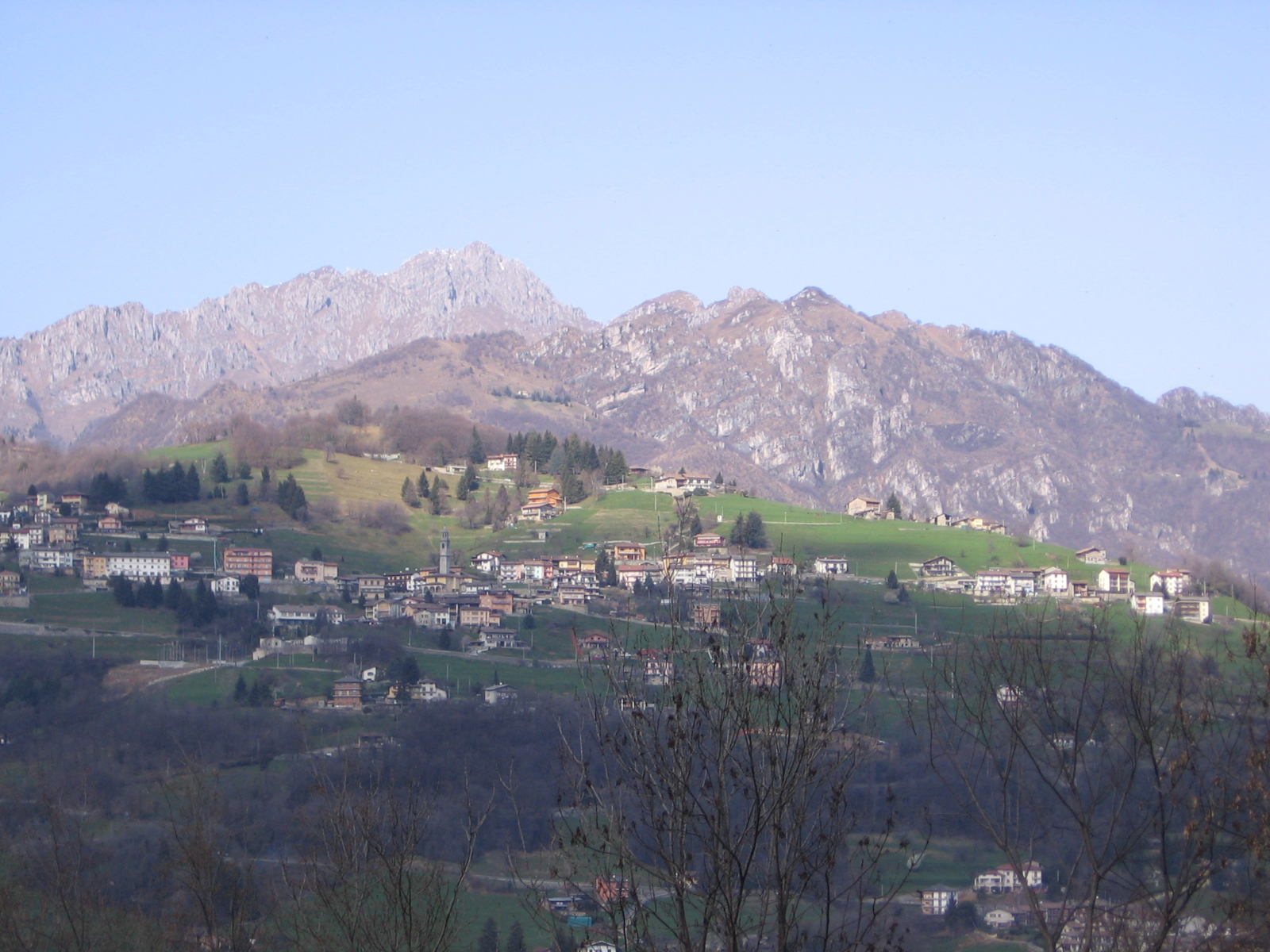
- View of the frazione Orezzo

- Coat of arms

- Location within Italy Location within Lombardy
- Coordinates: 45°48′N 9°50′E
- Country: Italy
- Region: Lombardy
- Province: Bergamo (BG)
- Frazioni: Masserini, Orezzo, Rova

Government
  - Mayor: Marco Masserini

Area
  - Total: 14.7 km^{2} (5.7 sq mi)
- Elevation: 386 m (1,266 ft)

Population (2019)
  - Total: 5,027
  - Density: 342/km^{2} (886/sq mi)
- Demonym: Gazzanighesi
- Time zone: UTC+1 (CET)
  - Summer (DST): UTC+2 (CEST)
- Postal code: 24025
- Dialing code: 035
- Patron saint: St. Hyppolite of Rome
- Saint day: August 13

Gazzaniga (Bergamasque: Gagianiga or Gazanega) is a comune (municipality) in the Province of Bergamo in the Italian region of Lombardy, located about 60 kilometres (37 mi) northeast of Milan and 18 kilometres (11 mi) northeast of Bergamo.

Gazzaniga borders the following municipalities: Albino, Aviatico, Cene, Cornalba, Costa di Serina, Fiorano al Serio, Vertova.

== History ==
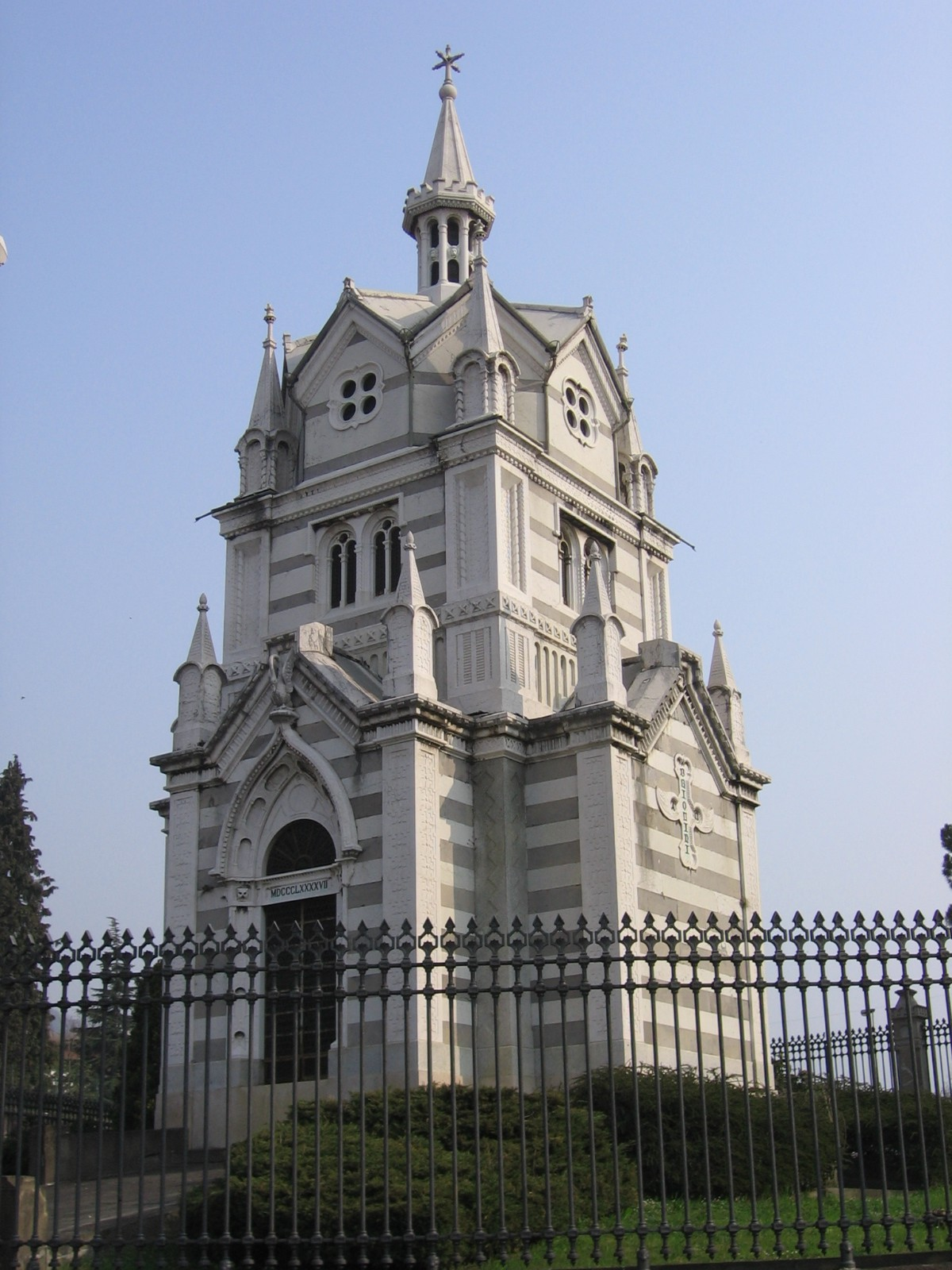
The Briolini mausoleum

Traces of human presence in the Bronze Age have been found in Gazzaniga. The first document attesting to the existence of a burgh (castle) dates from 476 AD when the Barbarian king Odoacer ransacked it. In the Middle Ages Gazzaniga was part of the Confederazione de Honio together with neighbouring communes; in 1397 Gazzaniga was destroyed by the Ghibellines, and again by the Guelphs in the next year.

Later Gazzaniga was in the possession of the Republic of Venice. In 1629 Gazzaniga suffered from a plague.

== Demographic evolution ==
Historical population

| Year | Pop. | ±% |
|---|---|---|
| 1861 | 2,004 | — |
| 1871 | 2,155 | +7.5% |
| 1881 | 2,546 | +18.1% |
| 1901 | 4,701 | +84.6% |
| 1911 | 4,576 | −2.7% |

| Year | Pop. | ±% |
|---|---|---|
| 1921 | 5,583 | +22.0% |
| 1931 | 4,672 | −16.3% |
| 1936 | 4,574 | −2.1% |
| 1951 | 5,264 | +15.1% |
| 1961 | 5,104 | −3.0% |

| Year | Pop. | ±% |
|---|---|---|
| 1971 | 5,216 | +2.2% |
| 1981 | 5,191 | −0.5% |
| 1991 | 4,853 | −6.5% |
| 2001 | 4,968 | +2.4% |

Source: Data from ISTAT
