= Fiorano al Serio =

- Comune
- Comune di Fiorano al Serio
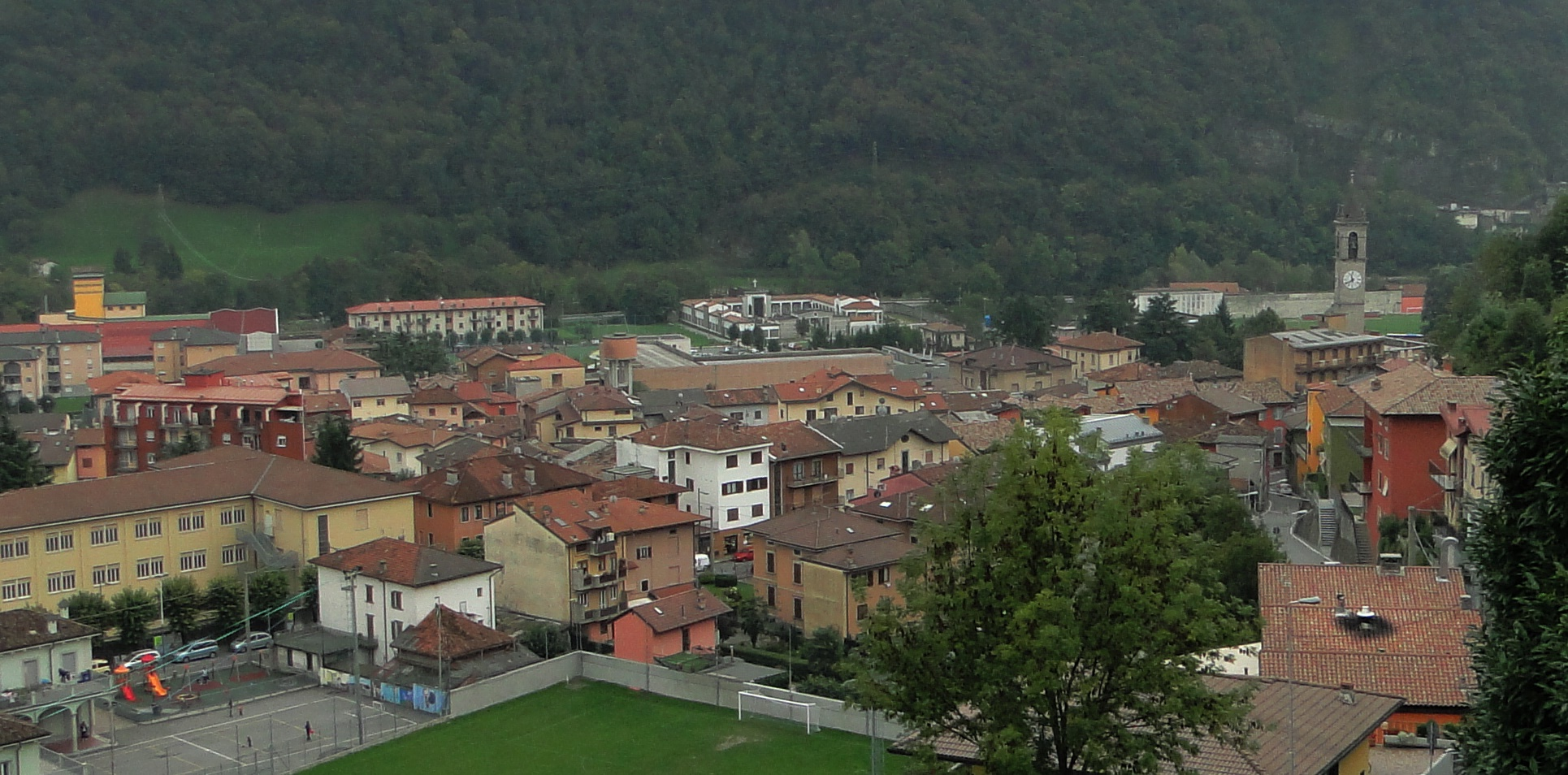
- Fiorano al Serio

- Location within Italy Location within Lombardy
- Coordinates: 45°48′N 9°50′E
- Country: Italy
- Region: Lombardy
- Province: Bergamo (BG)
- Frazioni: San Fermo

Government
  - Mayor: Andrea Bolandrina

Area
  - Total: 1.1 km^{2} (0.42 sq mi)
- Elevation: 396 m (1,299 ft)

Population (30 November 2016)
  - Total: 3,004
  - Density: 2,700/km^{2} (7,100/sq mi)
- Demonym: Fioranesi
- Time zone: UTC+1 (CET)
  - Summer (DST): UTC+2 (CEST)
- Postal code: 24020
- Dialing code: 035

Fiorano al Serio (Bergamasque: Fiorà) is a comune (municipality) in the Province of Bergamo in the Italian region of Lombardy, located about 60 kilometres (37 mi) northeast of Milan and about 15 kilometres (9 mi) northeast of Bergamo.

Fiorano al Serio borders the following municipalities: Casnigo, Cene, Gazzaniga, Vertova.

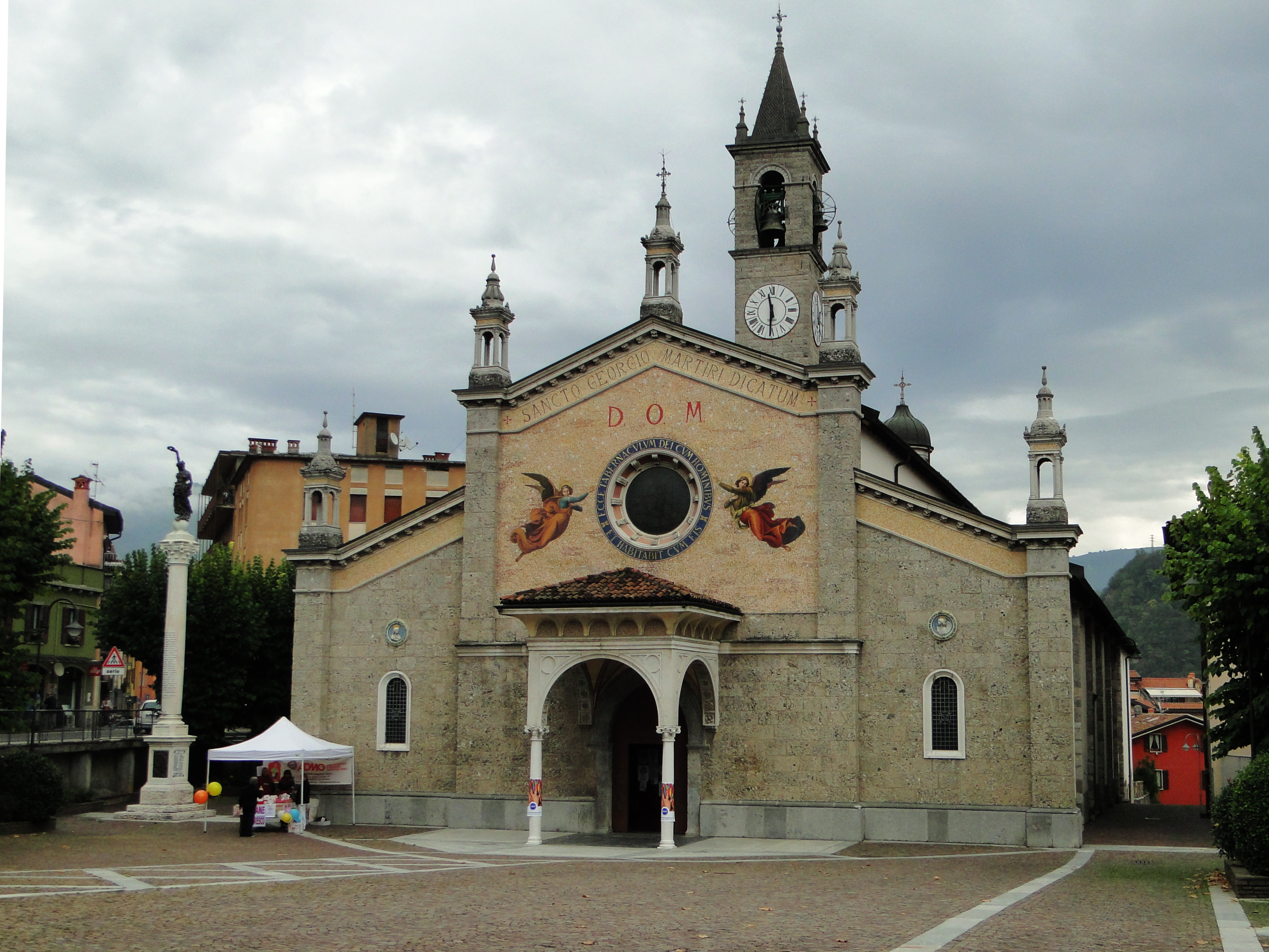
Parish church
