= Colzate =

- Comune
- Comune di Colzate
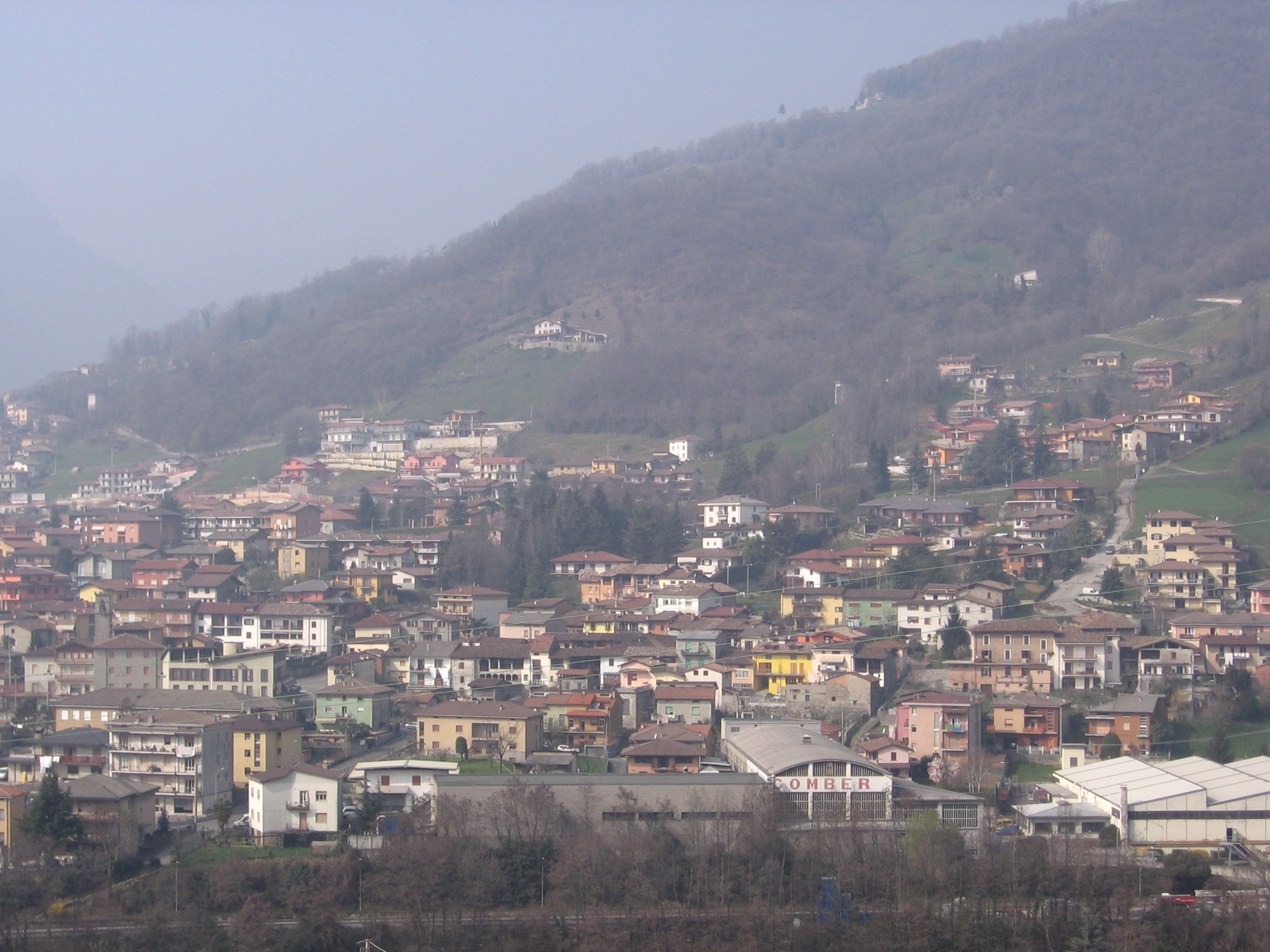
- Colzate

- Coat of arms

- Location within Italy Location within Lombardy
- Coordinates: 45°49′N 9°52′E
- Country: Italy
- Region: Lombardy
- Province: Province of Bergamo (BG)
- Frazioni: Bondo di Colzate, Piani di Rezzo

Area
  - Total: 6.7 km^{2} (2.6 sq mi)
- Elevation: 424 m (1,391 ft)

Population (Dec. 2004)
  - Total: 1,638
  - Density: 240/km^{2} (630/sq mi)
- Demonym: Colzatesi
- Time zone: UTC+1 (CET)
  - Summer (DST): UTC+2 (CEST)
- Postal code: 24020
- Dialing code: 035

Colzate (Bergamasque: Colgiàt) is a comune (municipality) in the Province of Bergamo in the Italian region of Lombardy, located about 70 kilometres (43 mi) northeast of Milan and about 20 kilometres (12 mi) northeast of Bergamo. As of 31 December 2004, it had a population of 1,638 and an area of 6.7 square kilometres (2.6 mi^{2}).

The municipality of Colzate contains the frazioni (subdivisions, mainly villages and hamlets) Bondo di Colzate and Piani di Rezzo.

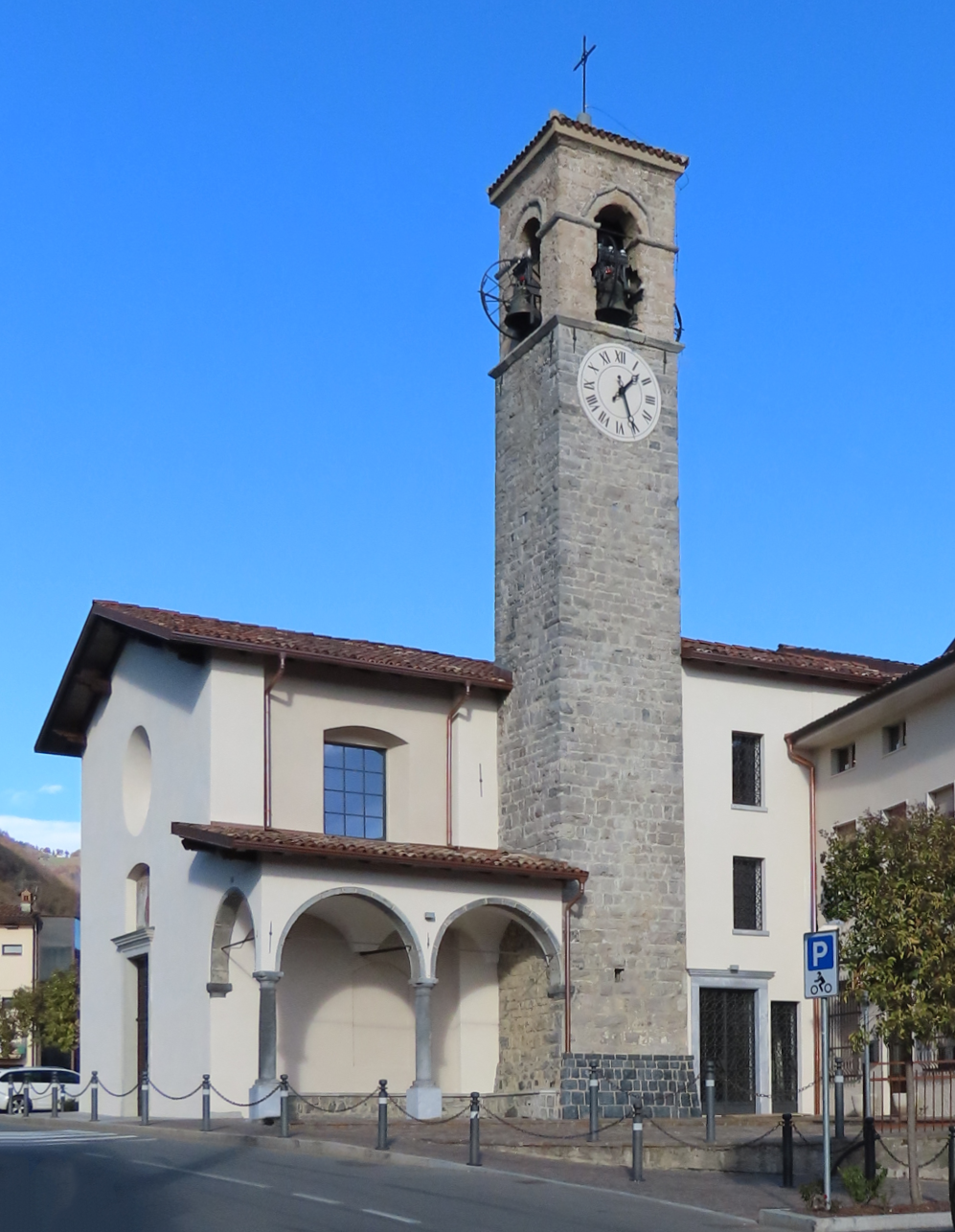
Parish church

Colzate borders the following municipalities: Casnigo, Gorno, Oneta, Vertova.

== Demographic evolution ==
Historical population

Year	Pop.	±%
1861	605	—
1871	605	+0.0%
1881	658	+8.8%
1901	821	+24.8%
1911	828	+0.9%

Year	Pop.	±%
1921	978	+18.1%
1931	1,146	+17.2%
1936	957	−16.5%
1951	1,011	+5.6%
1961	1,171	+15.8%

Year	Pop.	±%
1971	1,377	+17.6%
1981	1,590	+15.5%
1991	1,676	+5.4%
2001	1,662	−0.8%

Source: Data from ISTAT
