= Cene, Lombardy =

Cene
- Comune
- Comune di Cene
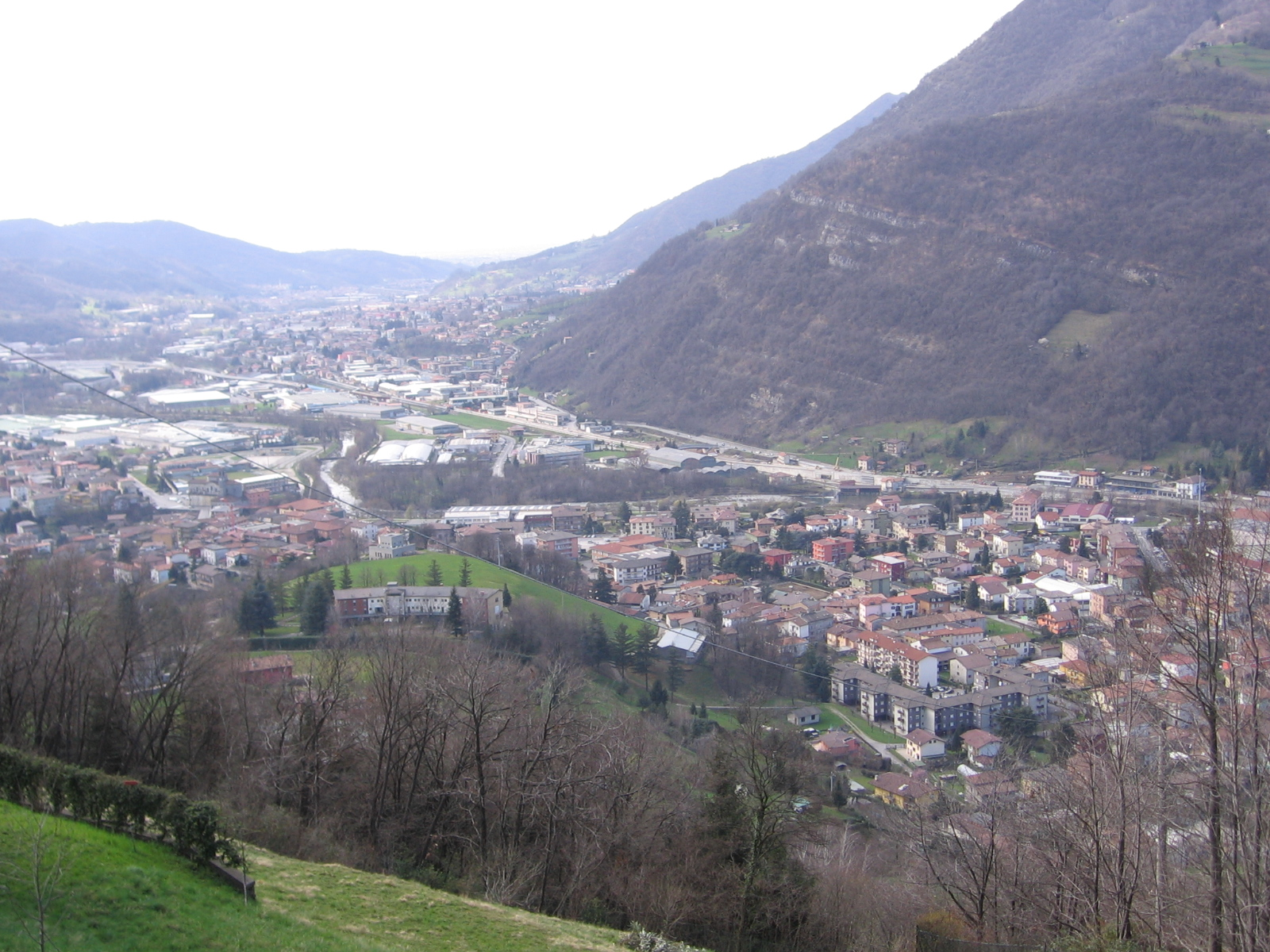
- Cene

- Coat of arms

- Location within Italy Location within Lombardy
- Coordinates: 45°47′N 9°50′E
- Country: Italy
- Region: Lombardy
- Province: Bergamo (BG)

Government
  - Mayor: Giorgio Valoti

Area
  - Total: 8.6 km^{2} (3.3 sq mi)
- Elevation: 368 m (1,207 ft)

Population (30 April 2017)
  - Total: 4,256
  - Density: 490/km^{2} (1,300/sq mi)
- Demonym: Cenesi
- Time zone: UTC+1 (CET)
  - Summer (DST): UTC+2 (CEST)
- Postal code: 24020
- Dialing code: 035
- Website: Official website

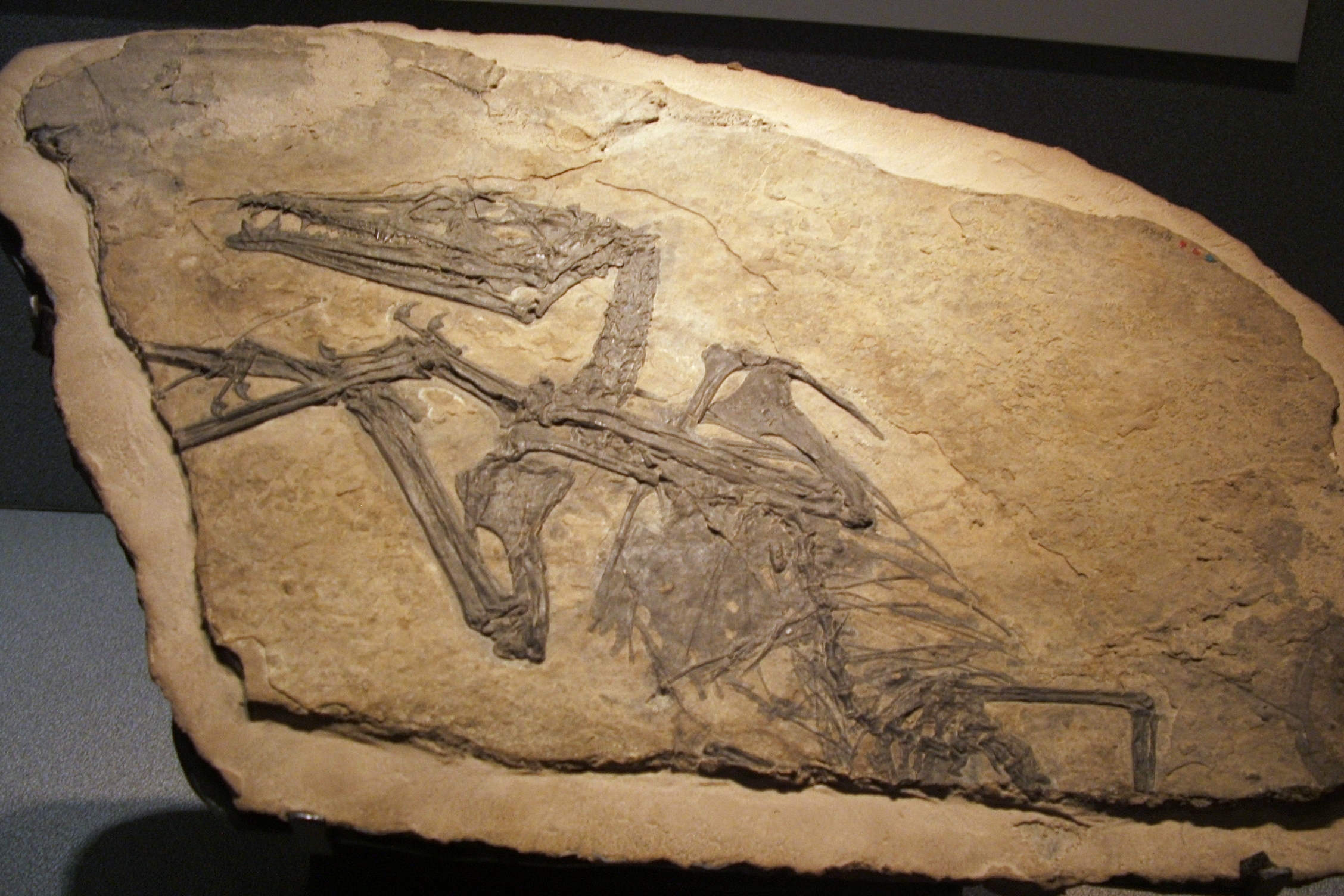
A fossil of Eudimorphodon, in the Museum of Natural Sciences in Bergamo.

Cene (Bergamasque: Scé) is a comune (municipality) in the Province of Bergamo in the Italian region of Lombardy, located about 60 kilometres (37 mi) northeast of Milan and about 15 kilometres (9 mi) northeast of Bergamo.

Cene borders the following municipalities: Albino, Bianzano, Casnigo, Cazzano Sant'Andrea, Fiorano al Serio, Gaverina Terme, Gazzaniga, Leffe.

== Paleontology ==
Fossil specimen of Late Triassic pterosaur MPUM 6009 was found in Upper Triassic (Norian) deposits of Cene. According to Dalla Vecchia, this specimen belongs to the species Carniadactylus rosenfeldi.
