= Casnigo =

- Comune
- Comune di Casnigo
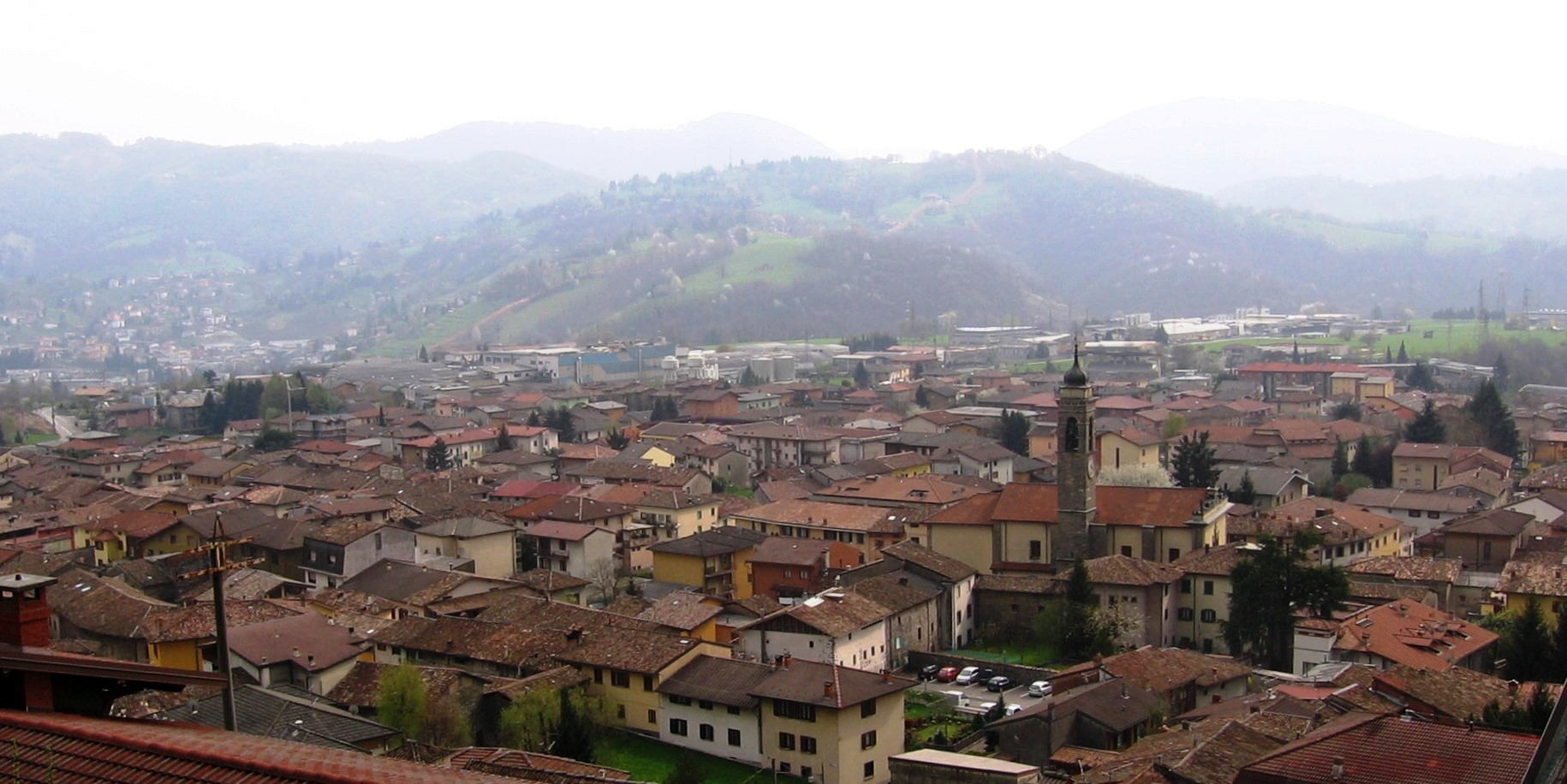
- Casnigo

- Location within Italy Location within Lombardy
- Coordinates: 45°49′N 9°52′E
- Country: Italy
- Region: Lombardy
- Province: Bergamo (BG)
- Frazioni: Barbata, Colle Bondo, Grumello, Mele, Ronco Trinità, Serio

Government
  - Mayor: Enzo Poli

Area
  - Total: 13.62 km^{2} (5.26 sq mi)
- Elevation: 514 m (1,686 ft)

Population (30 April 2017)
  - Total: 3,237
  - Density: 237.7/km^{2} (615.6/sq mi)
- Demonym: Casnighesi
- Time zone: UTC+1 (CET)
  - Summer (DST): UTC+2 (CEST)
- Postal code: 24020
- Dialing code: 035
- Website: Official website

Casnigo (Bergamasque: Casnìgh) is a comune (municipality) in the Province of Bergamo in the Italian region of Lombardy, located about 70 kilometres (43 mi) northeast of Milan and about 20 kilometres (12 mi) northeast of Bergamo.

Casnigo borders the following municipalities: Gandino, Cazzano Sant'Andrea, Vertova, Colzate, Ponte Nossa, Cene, Gorno, Fiorano al Serio.

== Culture ==
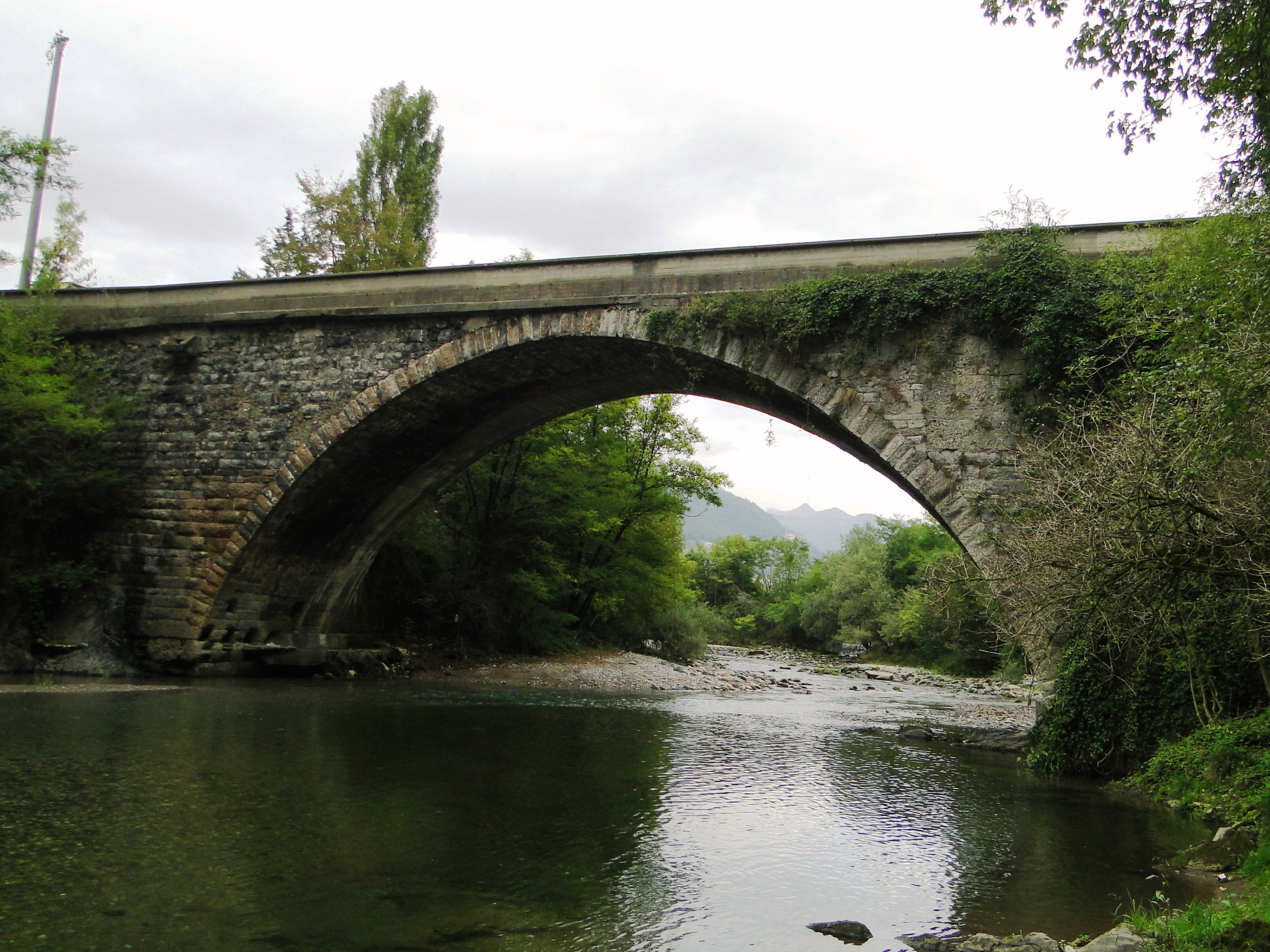
The Serio Bridge in Bay of the King

The city council of Casnigo has claimed the title "homeland of the Baghèt" (the Lombardy bagpipe), as the last traditional player of the instrument was the local Giacomo Ruggeri Casnigo (1905–1990).
