= Saint-Hilaire-de-Brens =

- Commune
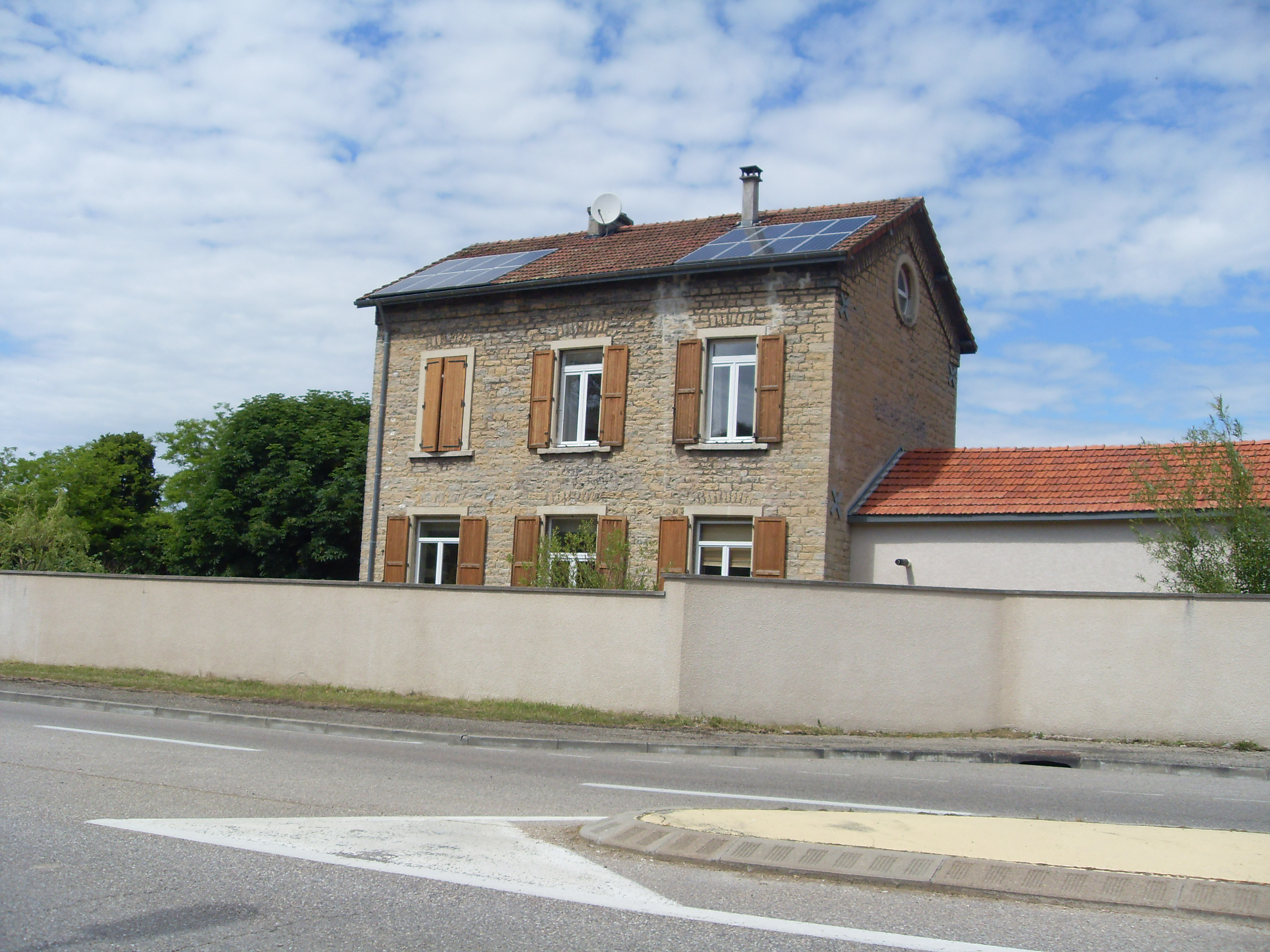
- Former train station

- Coat of arms
- Location of Saint-Hilaire-de-Brens
- Location within France Location within Auvergne-Rhône-Alpes
- Coordinates: 45°40′22″N 5°17′30″E
- Country: France
- Region: Auvergne-Rhône-Alpes
- Department: Isère
- Arrondissement: La Tour-du-Pin
- Canton: Charvieu-Chavagneux

Government
  - Mayor (2020–2026): Laurent Guillet
- Area^{1}: 7.52 km^{2} (2.90 sq mi)
- Elevation: 367 m (1,204 ft)
- Highest elevation: 387 m (1,270 ft)
- Lowest elevation: 218 m (715 ft)
- Population (2023): 603
  - Density: 80.2/km^{2} (208/sq mi)
- Time zone: UTC+01:00 (CET)
  - Summer (DST): UTC+02:00 (CEST)
- INSEE/Postal code: 38392 /38460
- ^{1} French Land Register data, which excludes lakes, ponds, glaciers > 1 km^{2} (0.386 sq mi or 247 acres) and river estuaries.

Saint-Hilaire-de-Brens is a commune in the Isère department in southeastern France.

== Population ==
Historical population
Year	Pop.	±% p.a.
1968	300	—
1975	280	−0.98%
1982	321	+1.97%
1990	392	+2.53%
1999	413	+0.58%
2007	505	+2.55%
2012	529	+0.93%
2017	636	+3.75%
2023	603	−0.88%
Source: INSEE

== Twin towns – sister cities ==
Saint-Hilaire-de-Brens is twinned with:

- Cornalba, Italy (1998)

== See also ==
- Communes of the Isère department
