= Ponte Nossa =

- Comune
- Comune di Ponte Nossa
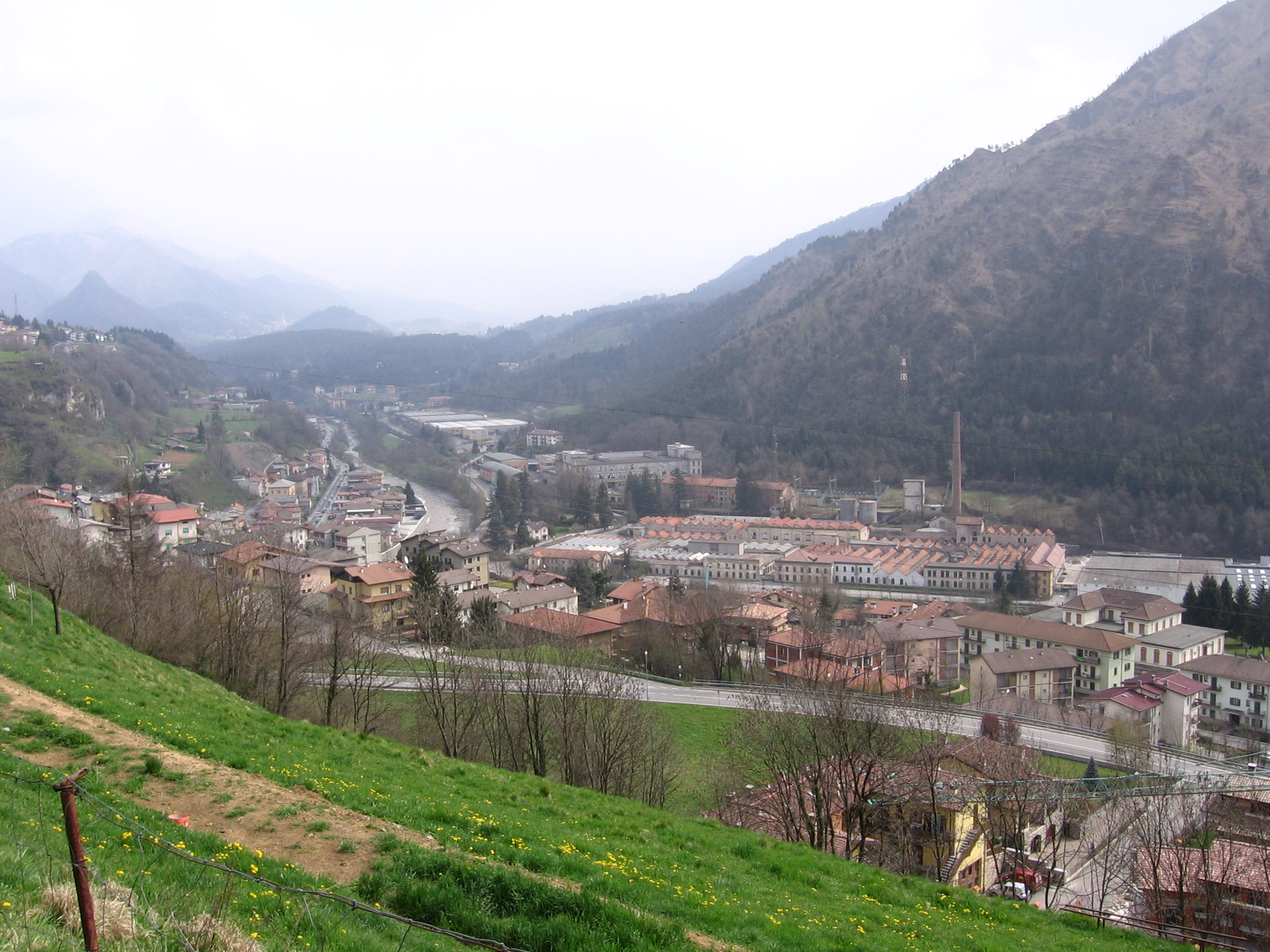
- Ponte Nossa

- Location within Italy Location within Lombardy
- Coordinates: 45°52′N 9°53′E
- Country: Italy
- Region: Lombardy
- Province: Province of Bergamo (BG)

Government
  - Mayor: Stefano Mazzoleni

Area
  - Total: 5.52 km^{2} (2.13 sq mi)
- Elevation: 424 m (1,391 ft)

Population (1 January 2025)
  - Total: 1,727
  - Density: 313/km^{2} (810/sq mi)
- Demonym: Nossese(i)
- Time zone: UTC+1 (CET)
  - Summer (DST): UTC+2 (CEST)
- Postal code: 24028
- Dialing code: 035
- Patron saint: Madonna delle Lacrime
- Saint day: 2 June
- Website: www.comune.pontenossa.bg.it

Ponte Nossa (Bergamasque: Nòsa) is a comune (municipality) in the Province of Bergamo in the Italian region of Lombardy, located about 70 kilometres (43 mi) northeast of Milan and about 25 kilometres (16 mi) northeast of Bergamo. As of 1 January 2025, it had a population of 1,727 and an area of 5.52 square kilometres (2.13 mi^{2}).

Ponte Nossa borders the following municipalities: Casnigo, Clusone, Gandino, Gorno, Parre, Premolo.

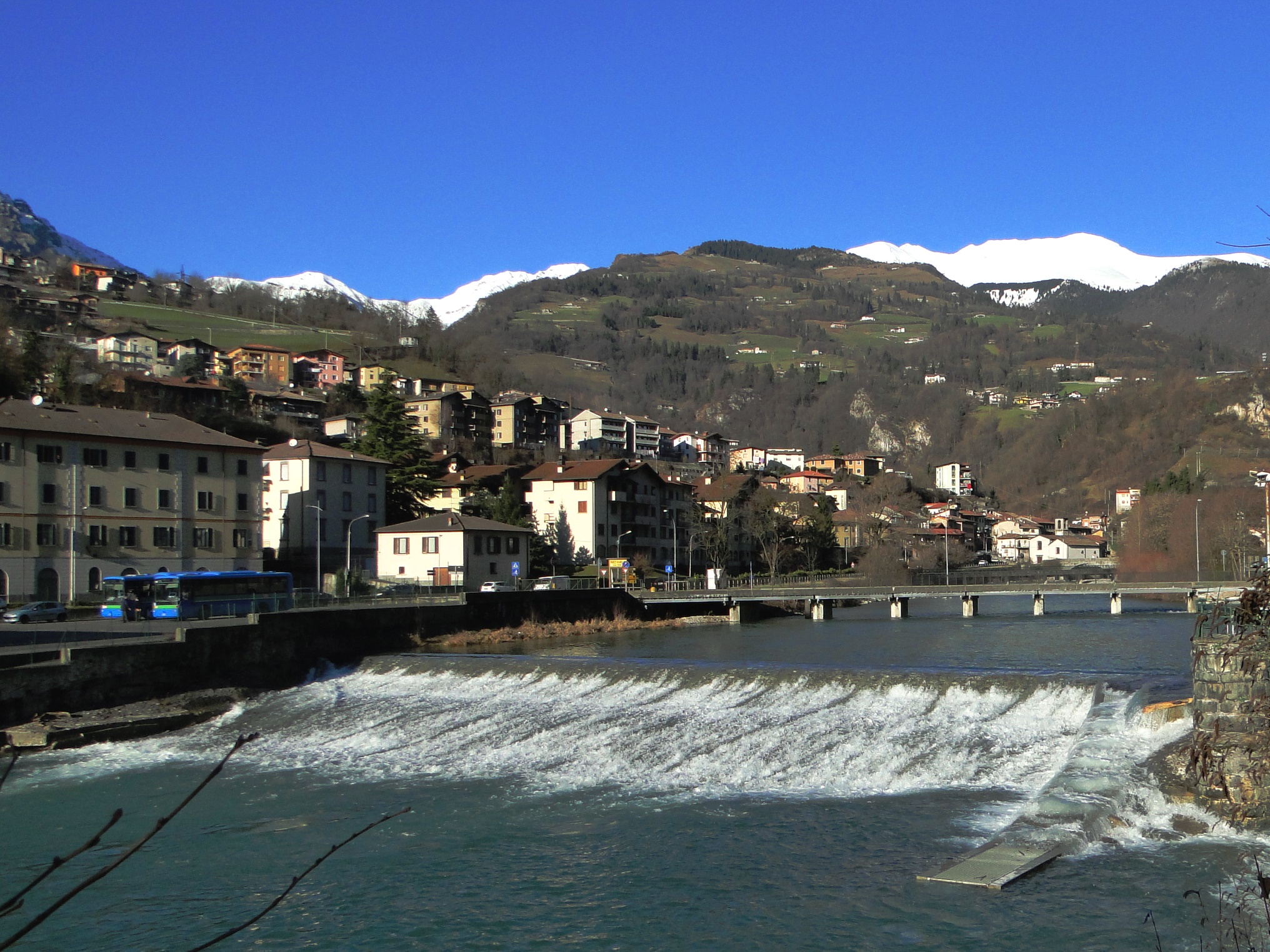
the river serio in Ponte Nossa

== Demographic evolution ==
Historical population

Year	Pop.	±%
1861	515	—
1871	520	+1.0%
1881	590	+13.5%
1901	2,213	+275.1%
1911	2,145	−3.1%

Year	Pop.	±%
1921	2,139	−0.3%
1931	2,365	+10.6%
1936	2,123	−10.2%
1951	2,334	+9.9%
1961	2,543	+9.0%

Year	Pop.	±%
1971	2,407	−5.3%
1981	2,266	−5.9%
1991	2,140	−5.6%
2001	2,046	−4.4%

Source: Data from ISTAT

== Twin towns ==
Ponte Nossa is twinned with:

- Teresina, Brazil (2011)
