= Vertova =

- Comune
- Comune di Vertova
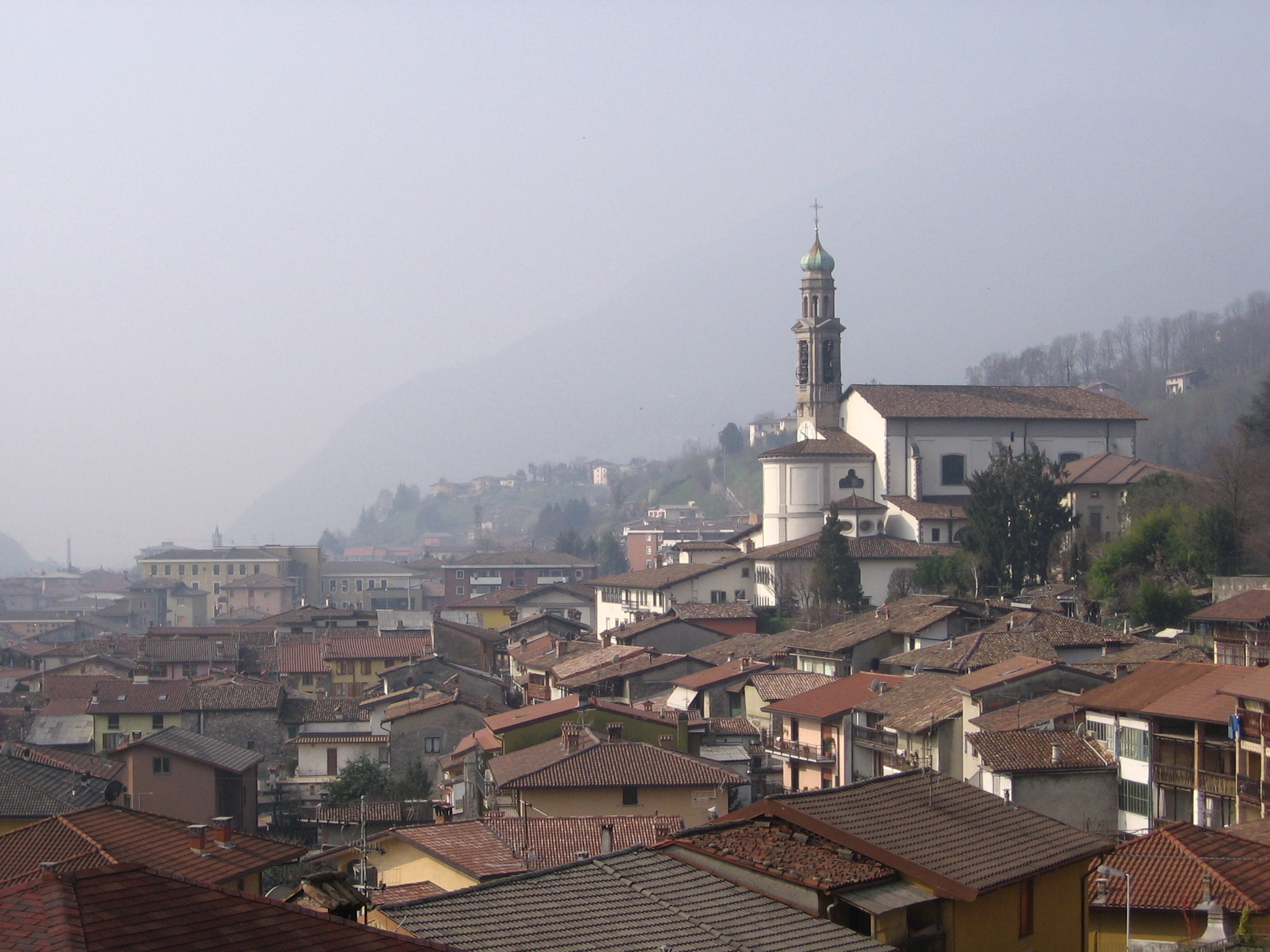
- Vertova

- Coat of arms

- Location within Italy Location within Lombardy
- Coordinates: 45°49′N 9°51′E
- Country: Italy
- Region: Lombardy
- Province: Bergamo (BG)
- Frazioni: Semonte

Government
  - Mayor: Riccardo Cagnoni

Area
  - Total: 15.69 km^{2} (6.06 sq mi)
- Elevation: 397 m (1,302 ft)

Population (31 May 2021)
  - Total: 4,499
  - Density: 286.7/km^{2} (742.7/sq mi)
- Demonym: Vertovesi
- Time zone: UTC+1 (CET)
  - Summer (DST): UTC+2 (CEST)
- Postal code: 24029
- Dialing code: 035
- Website: Official website

Vertova (Bergamasque: Èrfa or Èrtoa) is a comune (municipality) in the Province of Bergamo in the Italian region of Lombardy, located about 70 kilometres (43 mi) northeast of Milan and about 20 kilometres (12 mi) northeast of Bergamo. As of 31 May 2021, it had a population of 4,449 and an area of 15.69 square kilometres (6.06 mi^{2}).

Vertova borders the following municipalities: Casnigo, Colzate, Cornalba, Costa di Serina, Fiorano al Serio, Gazzaniga, Oneta.

== Main sights ==
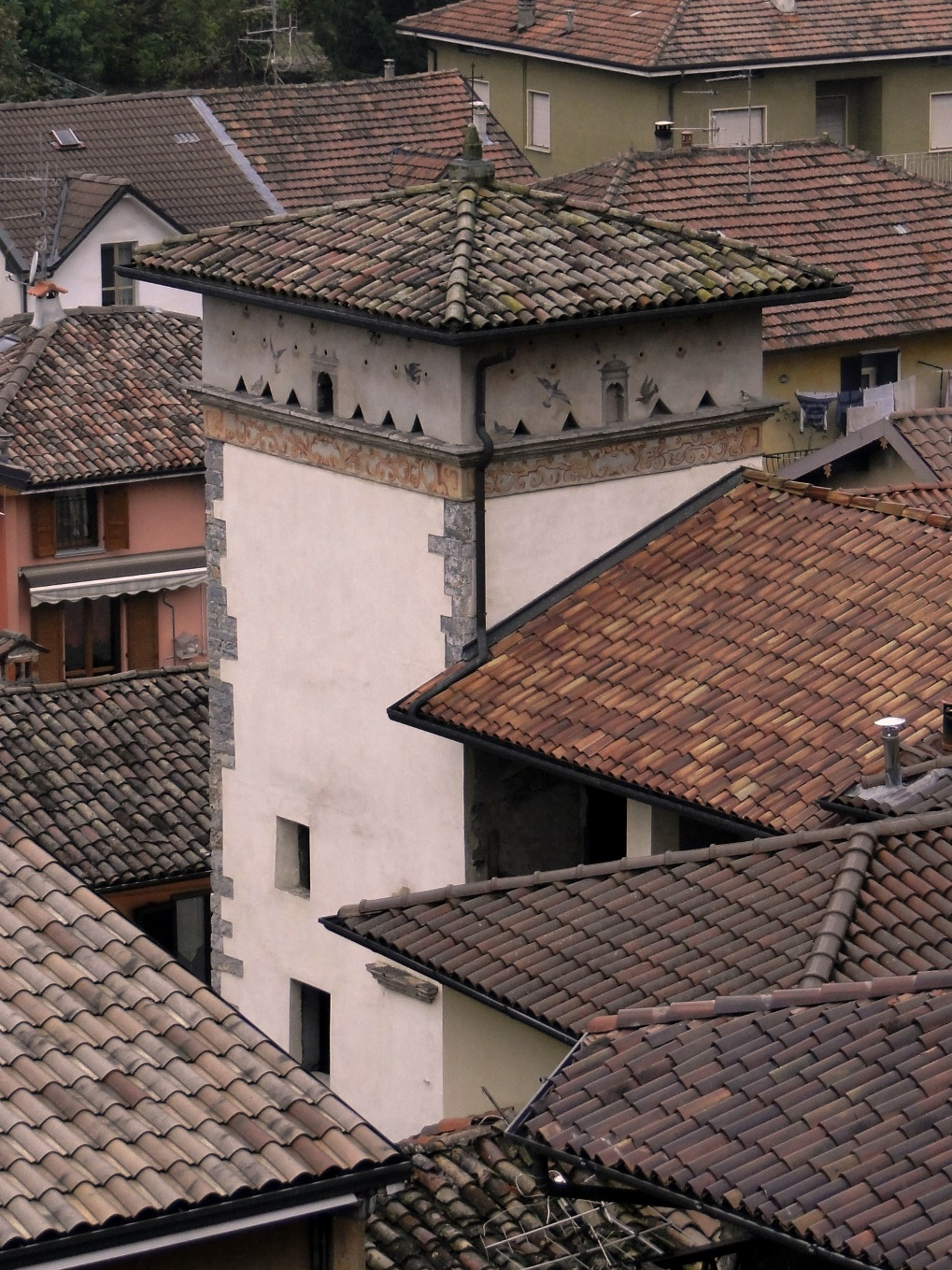
the Colombera tower

- Parish church of Santa Maria Assunta
- Church of San Lorenzo
- Historical center
- Capuchin Convent
