= Oneta =

Oneta may refer to:

== Places ==
Italy

- Oneta, Lombardy, a comune in the Province of Bergamo

Spain

- Oneta, Spain, a parroquia in the Municipality of Villayón, Asturias

United States

- Oneta, Oklahoma
