= Oneta, Lombardy =

Oneta
- Comune
- Comune di Oneta
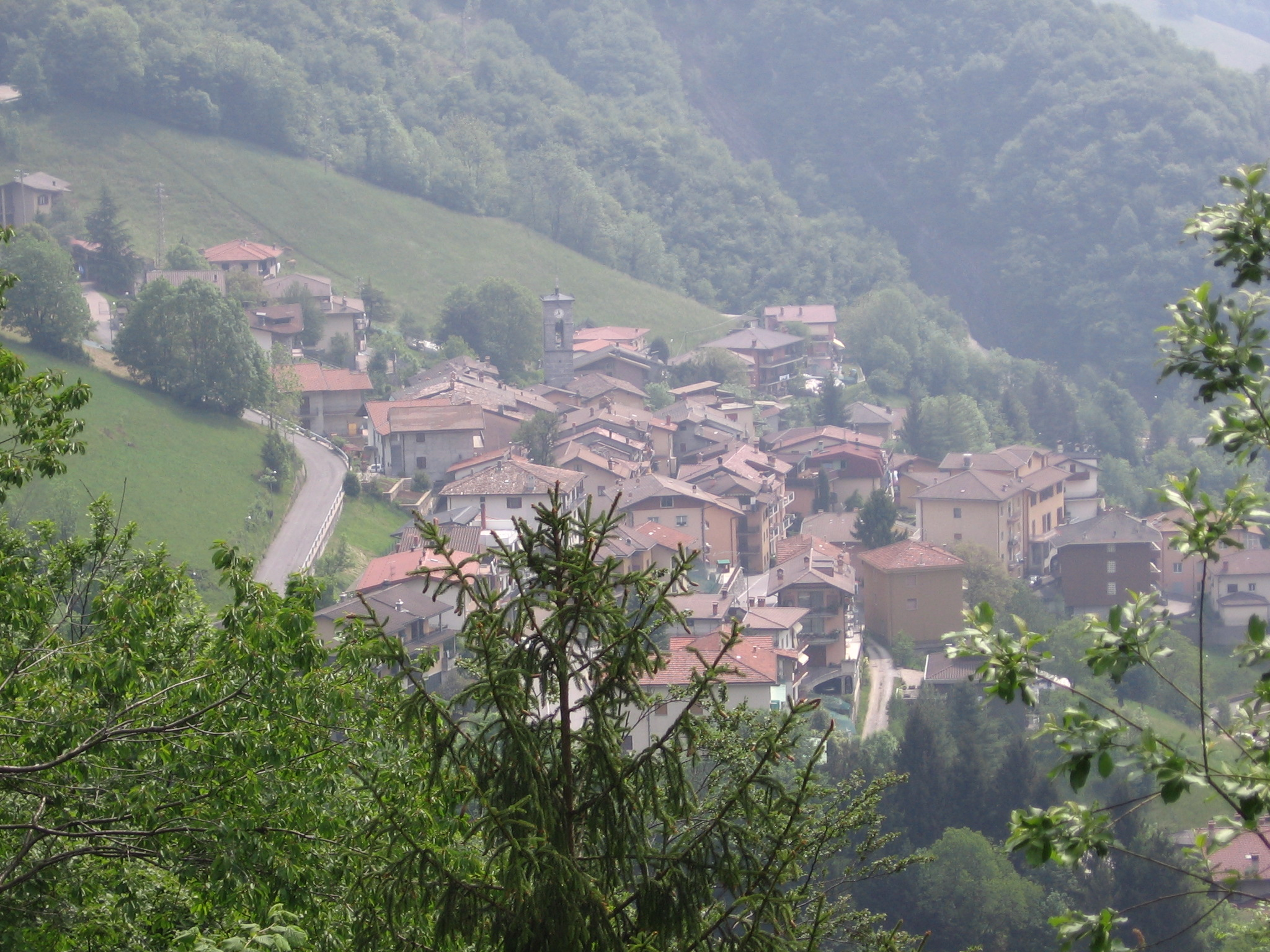
- Oneta

- Location within Italy Location within Lombardy
- Coordinates: 45°52′17.35″N 9°49′9.67″E
- Country: Italy
- Region: Lombardy
- Province: Province of Bergamo (BG)
- Frazioni: Scullera, Cantoni, Case Fanfani, Molino, Case Belotti

Area
  - Total: 18.3 km^{2} (7.1 sq mi)
- Elevation: 740 m (2,430 ft)

Population (Dec. 2004)
  - Total: 731
  - Density: 39.9/km^{2} (103/sq mi)
- Demonym: Onetesi
- Time zone: UTC+1 (CET)
  - Summer (DST): UTC+2 (CEST)
- Postal code: 24020
- Dialing code: 035

Oneta (Bergamasque: Onéda) is a comune (municipality) in the Province of Bergamo in the Italian region of Lombardy, located about 70 kilometres (43 mi) northeast of Milan and about 20 kilometres (12 mi) northeast of Bergamo. As of 31 December 2004, it had a population of 731 and an area of 18.3 square kilometres (7.1 mi^{2}).

The municipality of Oneta contains the frazioni (subdivisions, mainly villages and hamlets) Scullera, Cantoni, Case Fanfani, Molino, and Case Belotti.

Oneta borders the following municipalities: Colzate, Cornalba, Gorno, Oltre il Colle, Premolo, Vertova.

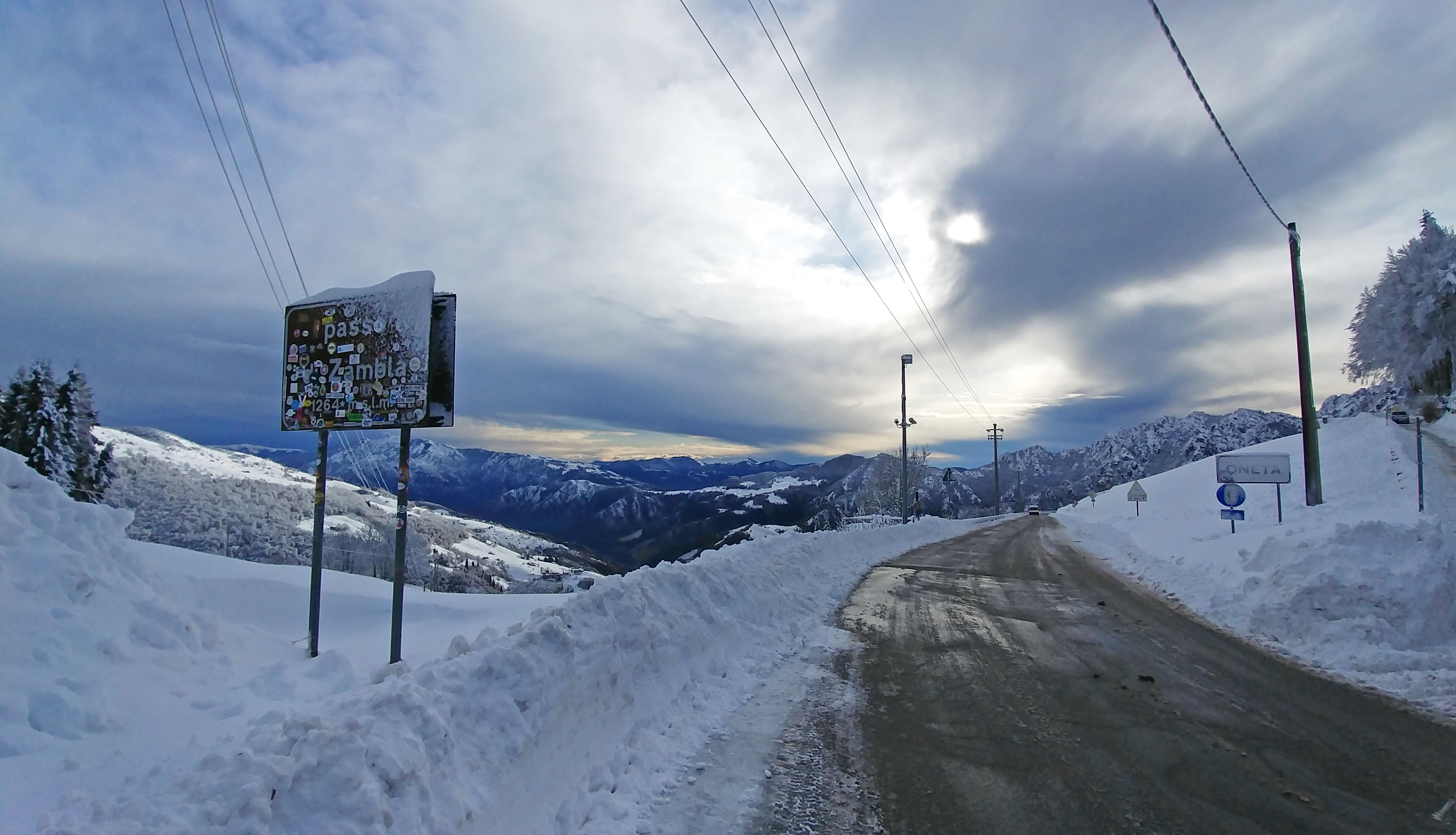
A view of Passo di Zambla

== Demographic evolution ==
Historical population

| Year | Pop. | ±% |
|---|---|---|
| 1861 | 575 | — |
| 1871 | 634 | +10.3% |
| 1881 | 685 | +8.0% |
| 1901 | 867 | +26.6% |
| 1911 | 945 | +9.0% |

| Year | Pop. | ±% |
|---|---|---|
| 1921 | 901 | −4.7% |
| 1931 | 995 | +10.4% |
| 1936 | 947 | −4.8% |
| 1951 | 1,127 | +19.0% |
| 1961 | 1,056 | −6.3% |

| Year | Pop. | ±% |
|---|---|---|
| 1971 | 837 | −20.7% |
| 1981 | 745 | −11.0% |
| 1991 | 716 | −3.9% |
| 2001 | 714 | −0.3% |

Source: Data from ISTAT
