= Baghèt =

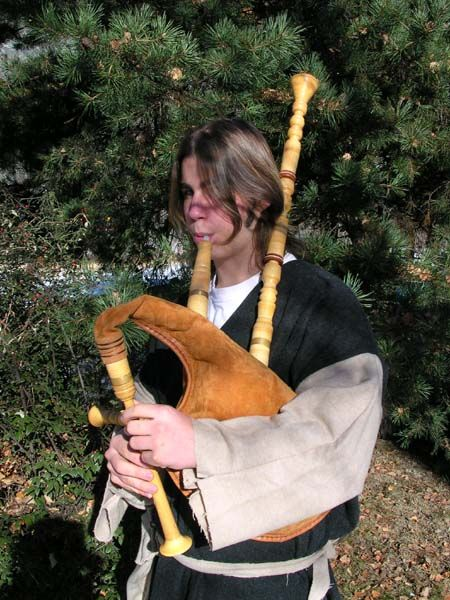
A musician with an Italian baghèt wearing traditional dress

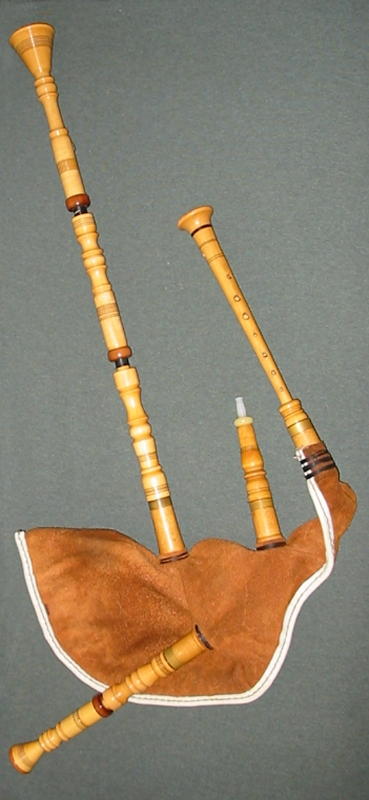
A modern baghet (made 2000 by Valter Biella) in Sol/G

The baghèt is a bagpipe historically played in Bergamo, corresponding to the region of Lombardy in modern Italy. It is a small double-reeded bagpipe with two drones, associated with rural musicians. The instrument became defunct in the mid-20th century, but is now played by some revivalists.

== History ==
Even if certainly much older, the baghèt's existence is attested by the end of 14th century in a fresco in the castle of Bianzano. Other representations are Malpaga Castle in Piario in the church of St. Augustine in Bergamo, in the Dance Macabre by Simon Baschenis in the church of San Vigilio, Pinzolo (in Val Rendena province of Trento). The instruments played in iconographic sources all have a chanter to play the melody, as well as a drone, which rests on the shoulder. In several pictures the bagpipes is accompanied by a bombard.

Abundant evidences in iconography and texts suggest that a similar bagpipe was used in the surroundings of Brescia and Verona, even if no instrument seems to be found.

The baghèt was primarily a rural instrument, played during the winter season when work was slow, until the festival of Epiphany when it would be put away until the next winter. The instrument was primarily produced locally, and often passed down father to son. Seven original baghèts, not all complete, were discovered in the modern era in val Gandino and val Seriana; the oldest of them had been handed down in the same family of players since 1870.

The Bergamo bagpipes were virtually abandoned in the social disorder of the mid-1950s, according to research by Valter, the last player baghèt was Giacomo Ruggeri Casnigo (1905–1990). The city council of Casnigo has claimed the title "homeland of the baghét".

The instrument was considered extinct, per the ethnomusicologist Roberto Leydi in his 1979 publication The bagpipes in Europe. However, since the 1980s new research carried out by the composer Valter Biella led to the discovery of some surviving pipes. Biella, together with Luciano Carminati, nephew of the musician Ruggeri, and other enthusiasts founded a baghèt association with the aim to restore the bagpipe traditions of the province of Bergamo.

== Construction ==
The bagpipe consists of:

- A small bag, thus the term baghèt ("little bag"). It is made of goat or sheep leather, first shaved and then folded the left side of the hair inside, and then sewn;
- A melody chanter, double-reeded, with the range of an octave in the key of A major
- A tenor drone, playing an octave below the chanter
- A bass drone, playing two octaves below the chanter, with a single-reed
- A blowpipe, used to inflate the bag by mouth.

== Etymology and variants ==
The term baghèt was the most used, but there were also the names of la pìa or the il pia baghèt. The player was called bagheter.

According to testimonies collected by the "baghèt" was present in Imagna valley in val Gandino in Valtorta in the middle and upper val Seriana, although probably the instrument had different forms, while retaining the same name.

== See also ==
- lmo:Bèrghem Baghèt, a Lombardy pipe-band.

== Sources ==
=== Monographs ===
- Valter Biella, Baghèt o piva delle Alpi, A.R.P.A, Bergamo 1984;
- Valter Biella, Ricerca sulla piva nel bergamasco Università degli studi di Bologna – DAMS, Bologna 1985;
- Valter Biella, Il baghèt un'antica tradizione bergamasca, Villadiseriane, Bergamo 1988;
- Valter Biella,"L'uso della cornamusa berghamasca "baghèt" con un nuovo repertorio di musiche tradizionali", Zanniniziative, Ranica (Bergamo), 1989;
- Valter Biella, Legno corteccia e canna, Sistema bibliotecario urbano di Bergamo, 1993;
- Valter Biella, Il baghèt, la cornamusa bergamasca, Meridiana, Bergamo 2000.
- Febo Guizzi, Guida alla musica popolare in Italia. 3. Gli strumenti, Libreria Musicale Italiana, Lucca 2002, p.226;
- Maurizio Pandolfi (con la collaborazione di Pierangelo Gabbiadini da Bagnatica), Metodo per lo studio della cornamusa bergamasca (baghèt), Cel-isa edizioni musicali, Bagnatica 2007.
- Pierangelo Gabbiadini da Bagnatica, L' In Canto del baghèt, Raccolta di danze, canti, e nuove composizioni originali per baghèt, percussioni ed altri strumenti rievocativi. Dal medioevo all'oggi arrangiati e/o composti dall'autore.

=== Articles ===
- Giuliano Grasso, in Symposium international sur la Cornemuse (atti convegno, 17 settembre 1988, La Haye, Pays Bas), Stichting Volkmuzieck Nederland, Utrecht 1989, pp.55-57;
- Valter Biella, "Le note del baghèt portavano il lieto annuncio di valle in valle", inserto del quotidiano L'Eco di Bergamo, 23 dicembre 1989;
- Valter Biella, "Parliamo di baghèt", in FB Folk bulletin, nuova serie, anno III, n° 8, ottobre 1991;
- Valter Biella, "Il baghèt, la piva delle valli bergamasche", in Mauro Gioielli (a cura di), La zampogna, Gli aerofoni a sacco in Italia, Cosmo Iannone Editore, Isernia, 2005 (ISBN 88-516-0069-4), I, pp. 1–22;
- Paolo Mercurio, Valter Biella maestro di baghèt, liutaio, suonatore e attivo promotore etnomusicale della cultura del Bergamasco, in “BF magazine”, aprile 2014, n.149;
- Paolo Mercurio, Valter Biella, il baghèt, la ricerca, la promozione musicale, in “Amici della Musica Popolare”, Milano 2014, pp. 113-125 ISBN 978-60-50342-95-6
