= Bergamasque Alps Regional Park =

Protected area in Lombardy, Italy

Parco regionale delle Orobie Bergamasche
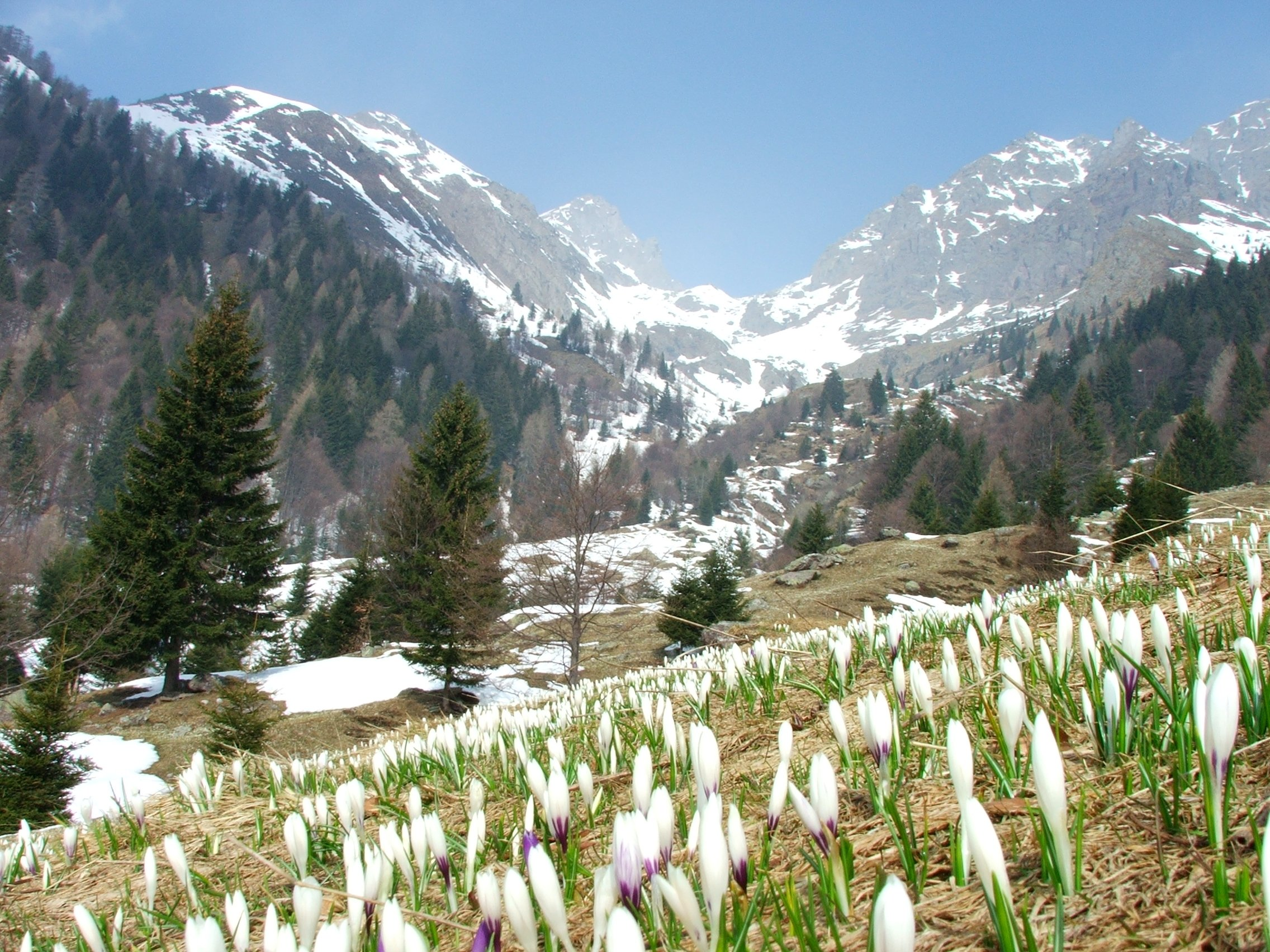

- Location within Lombardy Location within Italy
- Location: Lombardy, Italy
- Coordinates: 45°58′N 9°50′E
- Area: 68,898 ha (170,250 acres)
- Established: 1989
- Website: www.parcorobie.it

The Bergamasque Alps Regional Park (Italian: Parco regionale delle Orobie Bergamasche) is a nature reserve in Lombardy, Italy. Established in 1989, it encompasses the Bergamasque Alps, known in Italy as Alpi Orobie; with an area of nearly 70,000 hectares, it is the largest natural park in Lombardy.

The highest point of the park is Pizzo Coca, 3,052 meters above sea level. Over a hundred lakes are located in the park's territory, as well as the Trobio Glacier, the only surviving glacier on the southern side of the Bergamasque Alps, and the Serio Falls, the tallest waterfalls in Italy and among the tallest in Europe. Eight sites of community importance are located within the park, and 80 % of its territory is part of the Natura 2000 network.

The fauna includes alpine ibexes (reintroduced in the 1980s after going extinct in the first half of the century), chamois, roe deer, red deer, european mouflons, marmots, foxes, stoats, golden eagles, hawks, rock partridges, black grouse and western capercaillie. Nine species of insects are endemic of the park. The flora includes a dozen threatened species, including six that cannot be found outside of the Bergamasque Alps.

A network of over 1,000 kilometres of hiking paths stretches throughout the park.
