= Premolo =

- Comune
- Comune di Premolo
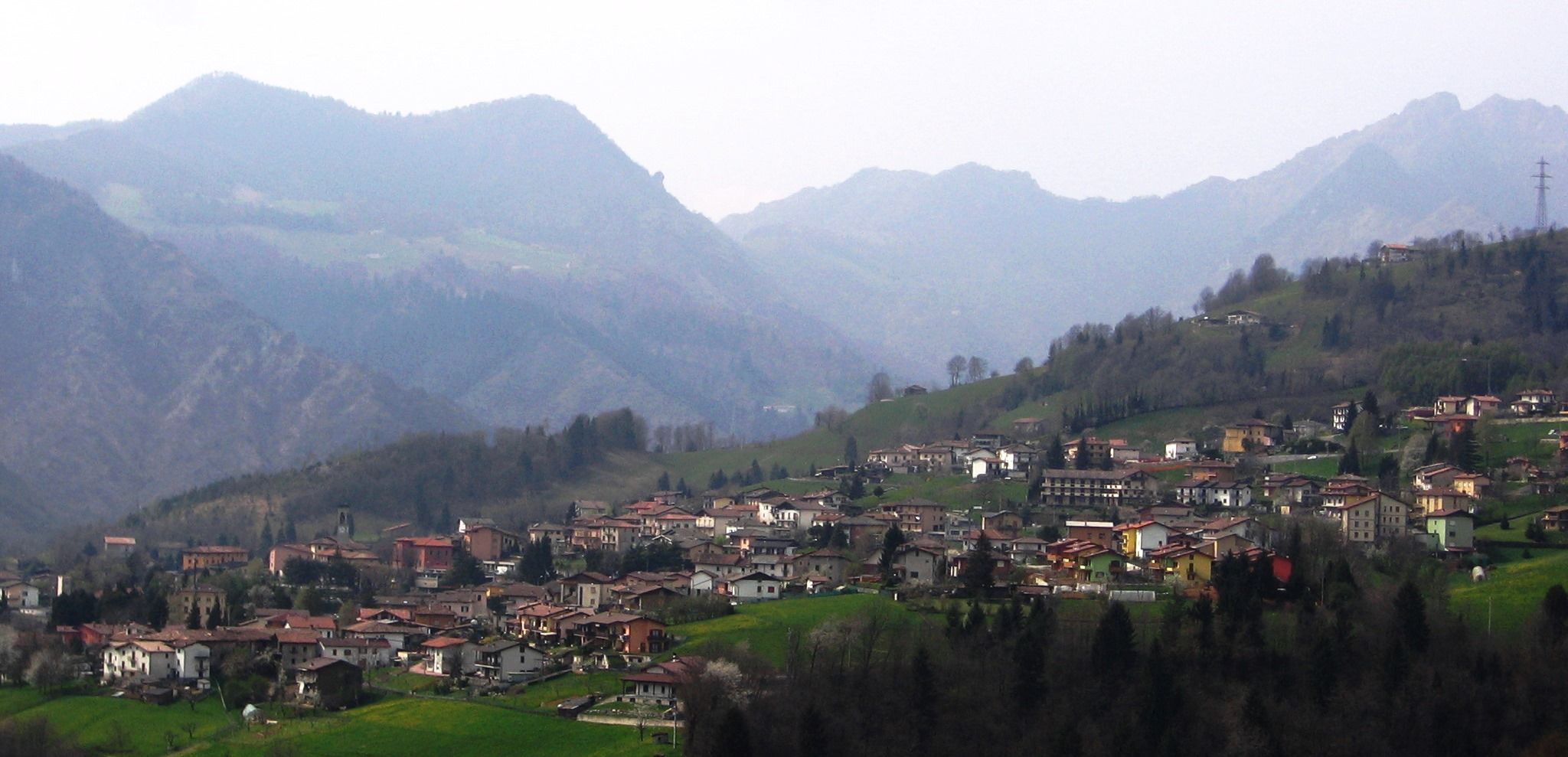
- Premolo

- Location within Italy Location within Lombardy
- Coordinates: 45°52′N 9°53′E
- Country: Italy
- Region: Lombardy
- Province: Province of Bergamo (BG)

Area
  - Total: 18.3 km^{2} (7.1 sq mi)
- Elevation: 625 m (2,051 ft)

Population (Dec. 2004)
  - Total: 1,094
  - Density: 59.8/km^{2} (155/sq mi)
- Demonym: Premolesi
- Time zone: UTC+1 (CET)
  - Summer (DST): UTC+2 (CEST)
- Postal code: 24020
- Dialing code: 035

Premolo (Bergamasque: Prémol) is a comune (municipality) in the Province of Bergamo in the Italian region of Lombardy, located about 70 kilometres (43 mi) northeast of Milan and about 25 kilometres (16 mi) northeast of Bergamo. As of 31 December 2004, it had a population of 1,094 and an area of 18.3 square kilometres (7.1 mi^{2}).

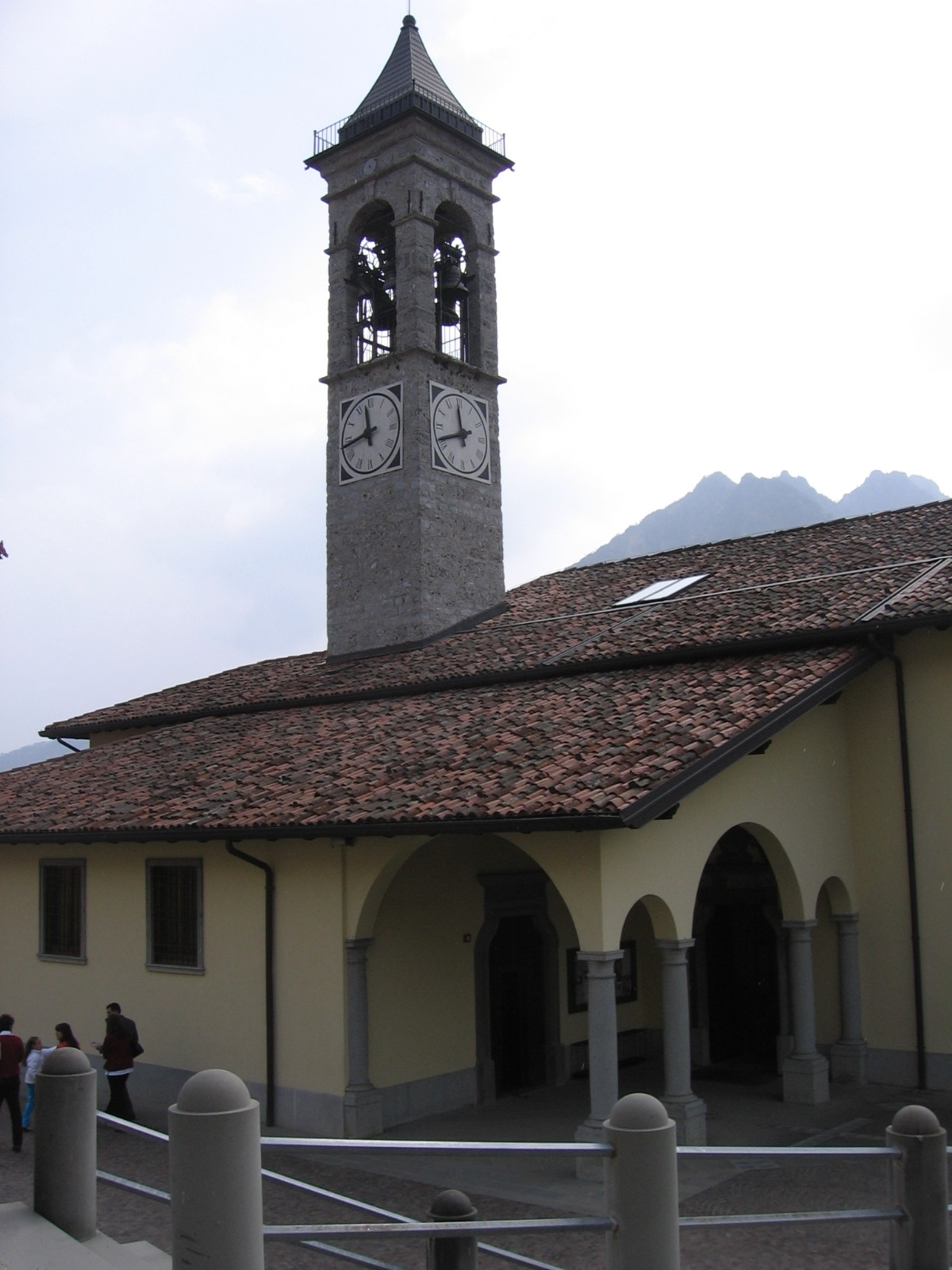
Parish Church of S.Andrea

Premolo borders the following municipalities: Ardesio, Gorno, Oltre il Colle, Oneta, Parre, Ponte Nossa.

== Demographic evolution ==
Historical population

| Year | Pop. | ±% |
|---|---|---|
| 1861 | 440 | — |
| 1871 | 460 | +4.5% |
| 1881 | 552 | +20.0% |
| 1901 | 740 | +34.1% |
| 1911 | 876 | +18.4% |

| Year | Pop. | ±% |
|---|---|---|
| 1921 | 846 | −3.4% |
| 1931 | 949 | +12.2% |
| 1936 | 922 | −2.8% |
| 1951 | 1,078 | +16.9% |
| 1961 | 1,078 | +0.0% |

| Year | Pop. | ±% |
|---|---|---|
| 1971 | 1,049 | −2.7% |
| 1981 | 1,022 | −2.6% |
| 1991 | 1,007 | −1.5% |
| 2001 | 1,029 | +2.2% |

Source: Data from ISTAT
