= Oltre il Colle =

Comune in Lombardy, Italy

- Comune
- Comune di Oltre il Colle
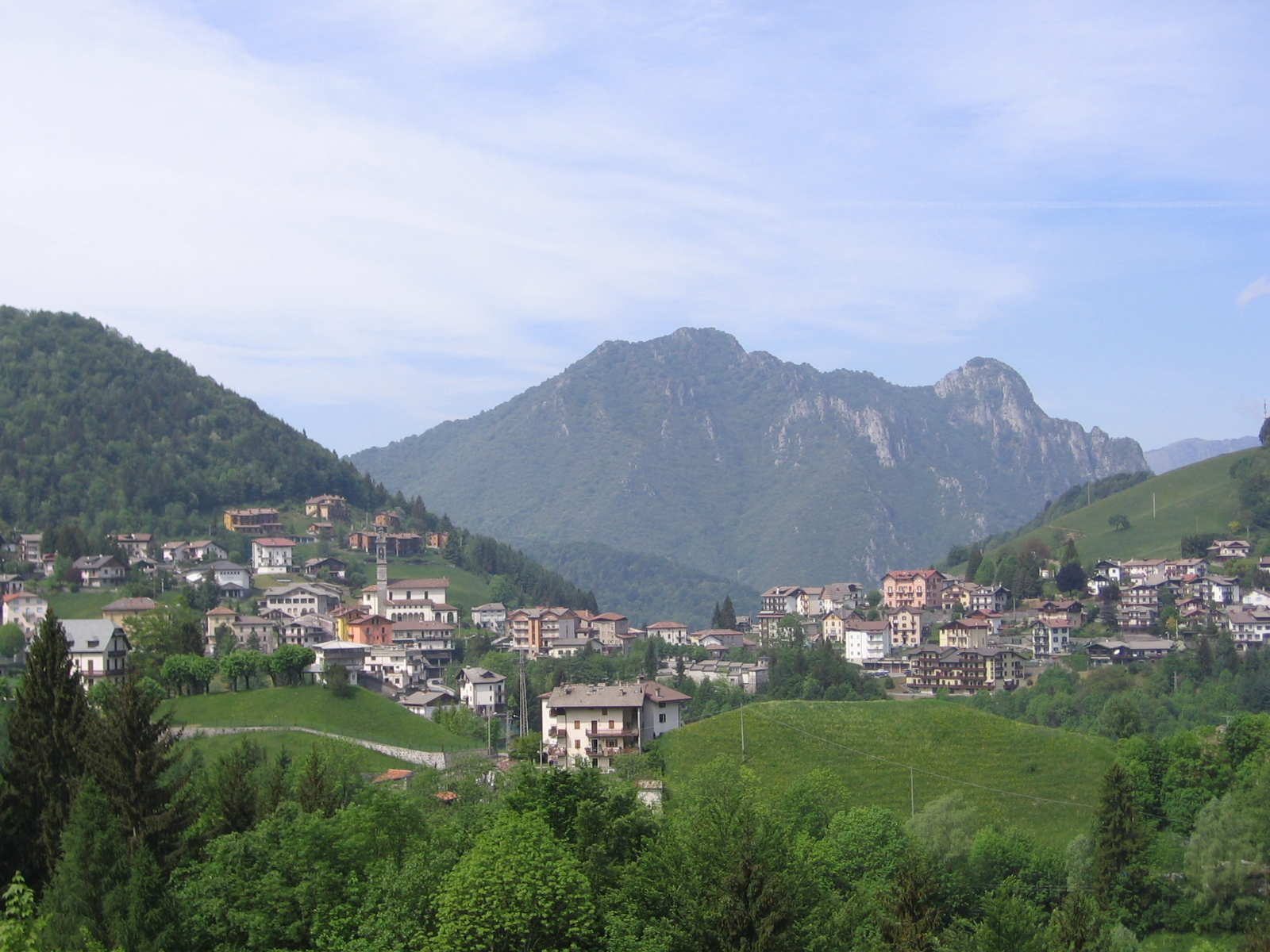
- Oltre il Colle

- Location within Italy Location within Lombardy
- Coordinates: 45°53′N 9°46′E
- Country: Italy
- Region: Lombardy
- Province: Province of Bergamo (BG)
- Frazioni: Zambla Alta, Zambla Bassa, Zorzone

Government
  - Mayor: Carlo Mandelli

Area
  - Total: 32.4 km^{2} (12.5 sq mi)
- Elevation: 1,030 m (3,380 ft)

Population (Dec. 2004)
  - Total: 1,114
  - Density: 34.4/km^{2} (89.1/sq mi)
- Demonym: Oltrecollesi
- Time zone: UTC+1 (CET)
  - Summer (DST): UTC+2 (CEST)
- Postal code: 24013
- Dialing code: 0345

Oltre il Colle (Bergamasque: Oltra 'l Còl lit. 'Beyond the Hill [of Zambla]') is a comune (municipality) in the Province of Bergamo in the Italian region of Lombardy, located about 70 kilometres (43 mi) northeast of Milan and about 20 kilometres (12 mi) northeast of Bergamo. As of 31 December 2004, it had a population of 1,114 and an area of 32.4 square kilometres (12.5 mi^{2}).

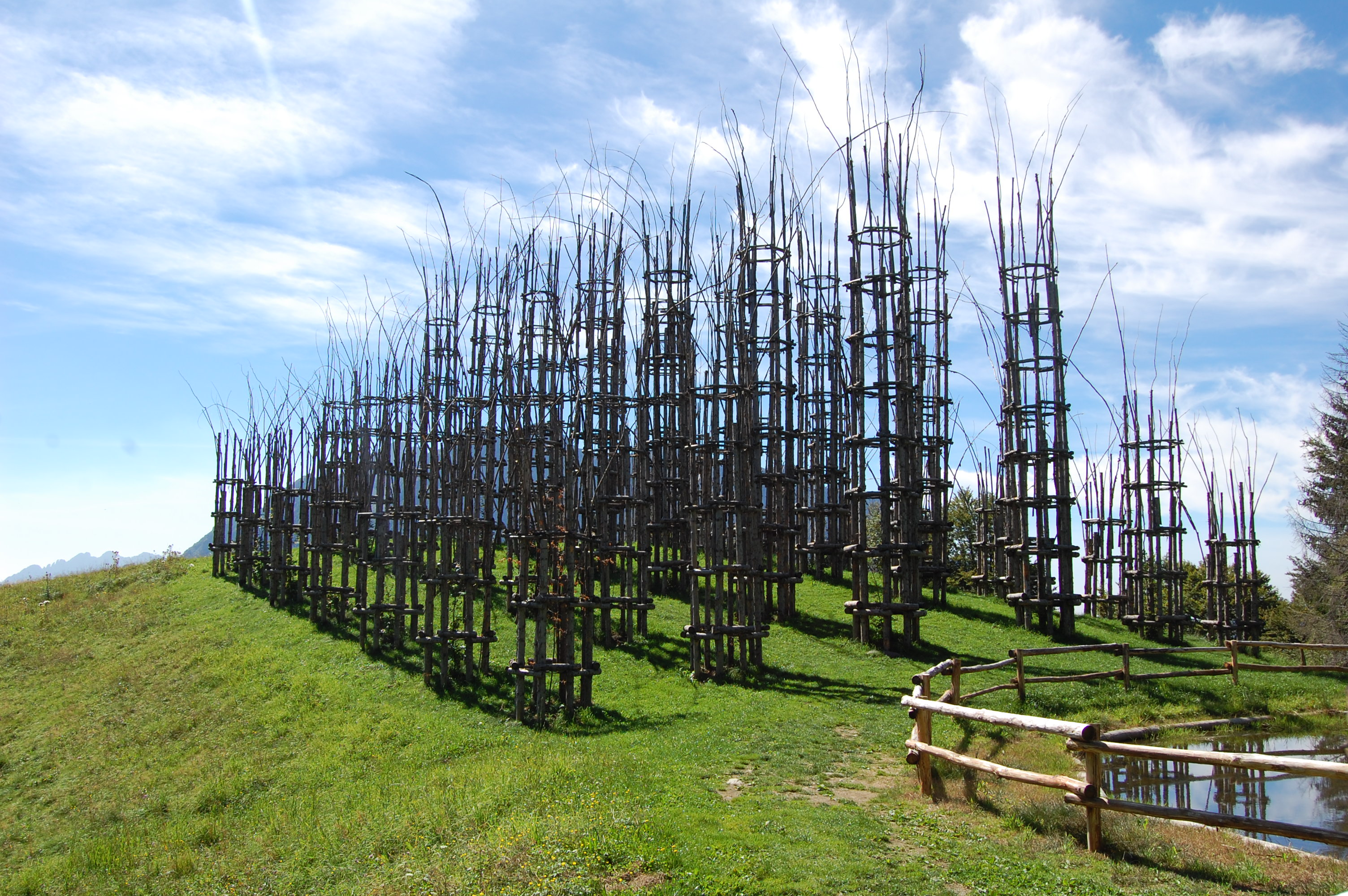
Vegetal Cathedral (September 2013)

The municipality of Oltre il Colle contains the frazioni (subdivisions, mainly villages and hamlets) Zambla Alta, Zambla Bassa, and Zorzone.

Oltre il Colle borders the following municipalities: Ardesio, Cornalba, Oneta, Premolo, Roncobello, Serina.

== Demographic evolution ==
Historical population

Year	Pop.	±%
1861	967	—
1871	1,090	+12.7%
1881	1,175	+7.8%
1901	1,375	+17.0%
1911	1,426	+3.7%

Year	Pop.	±%
1921	1,599	+12.1%
1931	1,727	+8.0%
1936	1,726	−0.1%
1951	1,945	+12.7%
1961	1,873	−3.7%

Year	Pop.	±%
1971	1,574	−16.0%
1981	1,376	−12.6%
1991	1,236	−10.2%
2001	1,142	−7.6%

Source: Data from ISTAT
