= Gorno =

Gorno Góren
- Comune
- Comune di Gorno
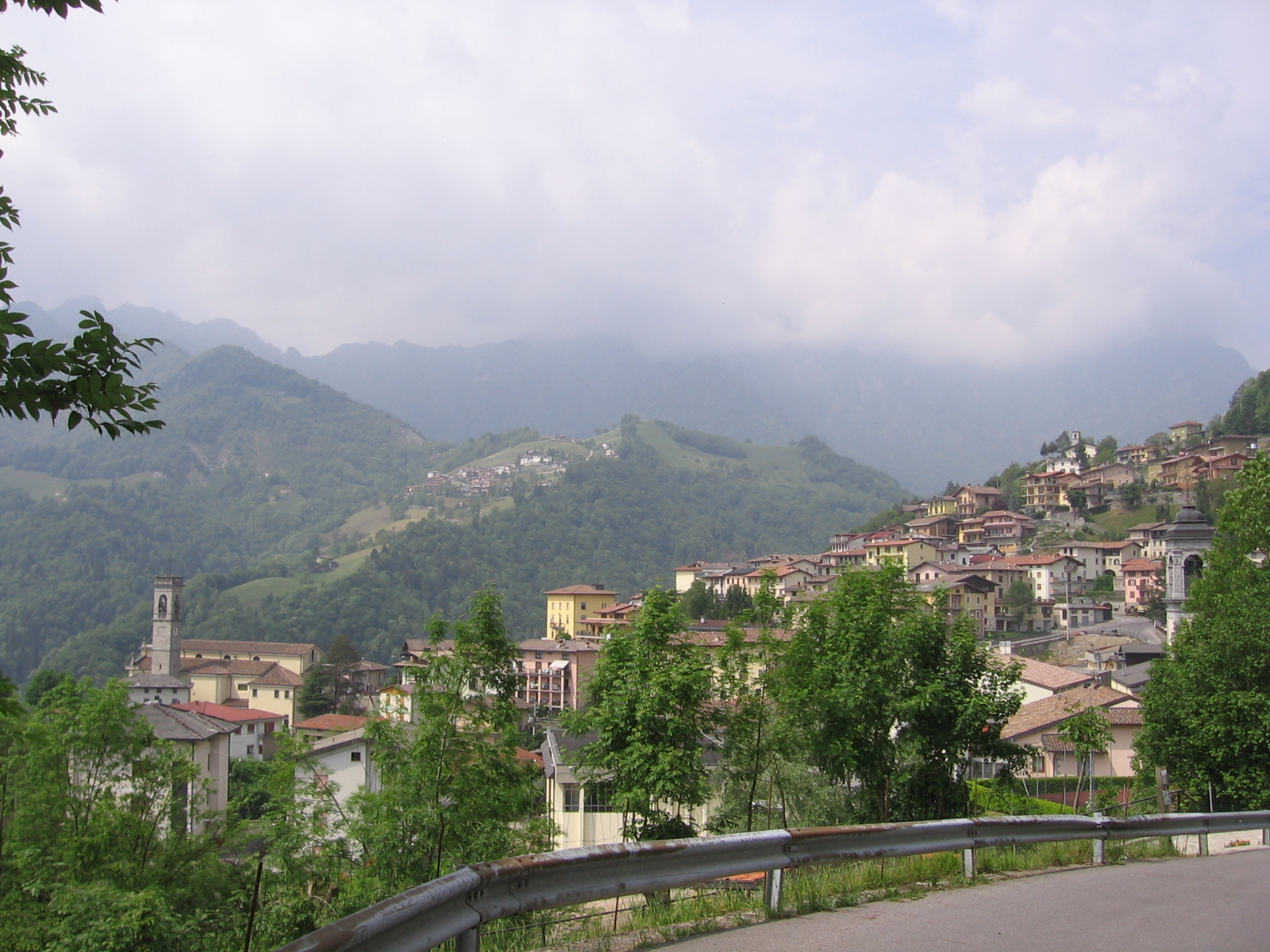
- Gorno

- Location within Italy Location within Lombardy
- Coordinates: 45°52′N 9°50′E
- Country: Italy
- Region: Lombardy
- Province: Province of Bergamo (BG)
- Frazioni: Riso, Chignolo, Erdeno, Campello, Sant'Antonio

Area
  - Total: 9.9 km^{2} (3.8 sq mi)
- Elevation: 710 m (2,330 ft)

Population (Dec. 2004)
  - Total: 1,760
  - Density: 180/km^{2} (460/sq mi)
- Demonym: Gornesi
- Time zone: UTC+1 (CET)
  - Summer (DST): UTC+2 (CEST)
- Postal code: 24020
- Dialing code: 035

Gorno (Bergamasque: Góren) is a comune (municipality) in the Province of Bergamo in the Italian region of Lombardy, located about 70 km (43 mi) northeast of Milan and about 25 km (16 mi) northeast of Bergamo. As of 31 December 2004, it had a population of 1,760 and an area of 9.9 km^{2} (3.8 sq mi).

The municipality of Gorno contains the frazioni (subdivisions, mainly villages and hamlets) Riso, Chignolo, Erdeno, Campello, and Sant'Antonio.

Gorno borders the following municipalities: Casnigo, Colzate, Oneta, Ponte Nossa, Premolo.

== Physical geography ==
=== Territory ===
The municipality is located in the lower part of the Val del Riso, a valley that starts east of the Colle di Zambla and descends opening westward, flowing into the wider Val Seriana. The territory draws an irregular geometric profile, with very pronounced elevation variations. The altitude of the municipal territory ranges between a minimum altitude of 475 m a.s.l. in the locality of Centrale (at the entrance of the town) and a maximum altitude of 1,775 m a.s.l. in the locality of Preda Balaranda, with a difference in altitude of 1,300 m characterized in the upper part by a very wide and suggestive panoramic opening offered by the surrounding Orobic mountains.

The municipality of Gorno covers 9.87 km² and borders the municipalities of Ponte Nossa, Premolo, Oneta, Casnigo and Colzate.

According to the civil protection seismic classification, it is in zone 4, i.e., subject to very low seismicity.

== Demographic evolution ==
Historical population

Year	Pop.	±%
1861	628	—
1871	720	+14.6%
1881	923	+28.2%
1901	1,191	+29.0%
1911	1,609	+35.1%

Year	Pop.	±%
1921	1,581	−1.7%
1931	1,787	+13.0%
1936	1,806	+1.1%
1951	2,194	+21.5%
1961	2,267	+3.3%

Year	Pop.	±%
1971	2,101	−7.3%
1981	2,013	−4.2%
1991	1,849	−8.1%
2001	1,778	−3.8%

Source: Data from ISTAT
