= Darfo Boario Terme =

- Comune
- Città di Darfo Boario Terme
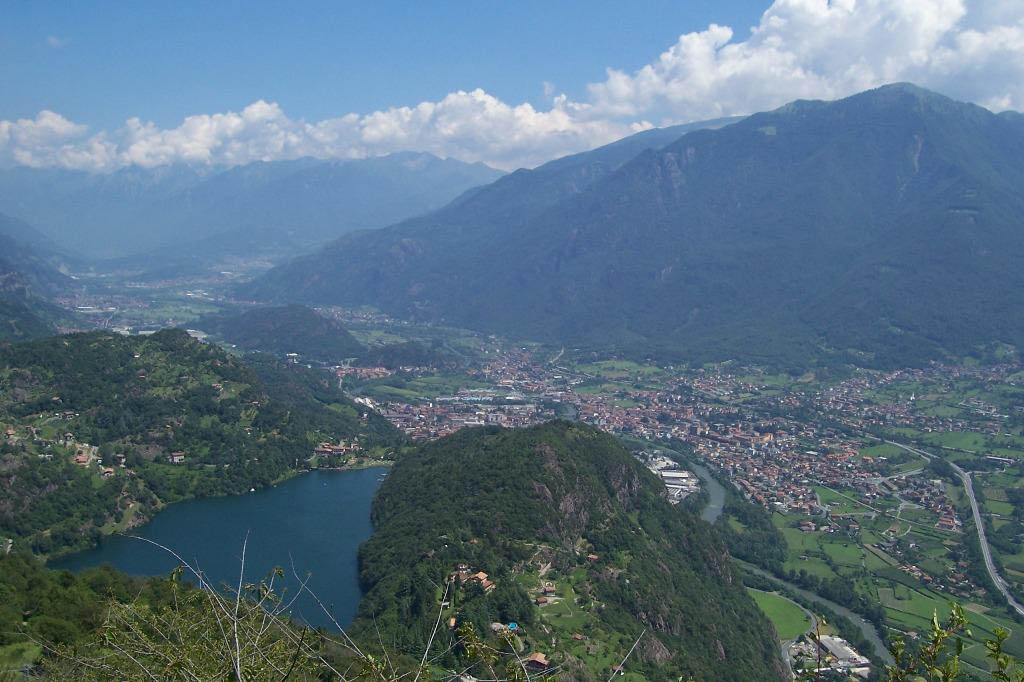

- Coat of arms

- Location within Italy Location within Lombardy
- Coordinates: 45°53′40″N 10°11′12″E
- Country: Italy
- Region: Lombardy
- Province: Brescia (BS)
- Frazioni: Angone, Bessimo, Boario Terme, Capo di Lago, Corna, Erbanno, Fucine, Gorzone, Montecchio, Pellalepre

Government
  - Mayor: Ezio Mondini

Area
  - Total: 36 km^{2} (14 sq mi)
- Elevation: 220 m (720 ft)

Population (30 June 2017)
  - Total: 15,526
  - Density: 430/km^{2} (1,100/sq mi)
- Demonym: Darfensi
- Time zone: UTC+1 (CET)
  - Summer (DST): UTC+2 (CEST)
- Postal code: 25041 (Boario), 25047 (Darfo)
- Dialing code: 0364
- Patron saint: Faustino and Giovita
- Saint day: 15 February
- Website: Official website

Darfo Boario Terme (Camunian: Dórf) is a comune in the province of Brescia, in Lombardy, northern Italy. The name combines Darfo, the capoluogo, with Boario Terme, the largest frazione.

It is bounded by the communes of Angolo Terme, Artogne, Esine, Gianico, Piancogno, Rogno. The small lake Lago Moro is located in the commune.

== Geography ==
=== Territory ===
Around the centre, i.e. Darfo, Boario Terme, Corna and Montecchio, the following areas develop in a radial pattern: Erbanno, Gorzone, Sciano, Angone, Fucine, Pellalepre, Bessimo Superiore and Capo di Largo. The four most important quarters of the town (Darfo, Boario Terme, Corna and Montecchio) are closely integrated to form a sort of quadrilateral, the centre of which is the "Isola" area, a name derived from the fact that it lies at a bend in the River Oglio.

=== Area ===
The urban area has a surface area of 36,200 square kilometers, and from an altimetrical point of view, the difference in height is considerable: from the lowest point of Bessimo Superiore (206 m) to the highest point of Dosso Sparviero (1895 m).

=== Mountainous reliefs ===
Monte Erbanno (1664 metres) and Altissimo (1704 metres) are found to the north-west, Dosso Blussega (1810 metres) and Dosso Sparviero to the south-west (1895 metres). The area has rock formations in Montecchio and Corna, and gravel and sand along the bed of the River Oglio. The Monticoli (deriving from the late Latin monticŭlus, diminutive of mons : montis, meaning 'mountain') are characteristic to the town of Darfo Boario Terme, and have periodically protected the Piana Boario from the flooding of the River Oglio and their maximum height is 394 metres.

==== Pietra Simona ====
The rock outcropping that forms the characteristic Monticoli is made up of red sandstone, also known as 'Pietra Simona', from the area of Simoni in Gorzone, where it has been quarried since ancient times. Simona stone is the basic and characteristic element of the nature and landscape of the Bassa Valcamonica (in particular of Darfo Boario Terme), and because of its natural availability, is the basis of rock art. Simona stone is a contact metamorphism sandstone; it has a uniform stratification plane and a fracture plane of 45 degrees. It has the negative solubility of cement, porosity, permeability and chemical resistance. It is a kind of elastic rock and has considerable resistance to processing. Its specific gravity is calculated at 33 quintals per cubic metre and, when smooth, it has a textured matte sheen. The characteristic that makes it immediately recognisable is its consistently purplish-red colour. The versatility of this sandstone withstood competition from marble in the Middle Ages. Marcello Ricardi wrote in Article 1 of the magazine 'L'Ogliolo', 'Owning the portal of the Simona stone house means that a family can be seen in Vicinie, either for personal wealth or political influence. In many villages in the Camonica Valley these structures are still intact, and the date of the inauguration is often engraved...

=== Hydrography ===
Beneath the historic centre of Erbanno there is a river floodplain, today houses and industry are everywhere, but until a few decades ago it was a cultivated area. Thousands of years ago this plain was the site of a lake basin, which extended from today's Lake Iseo to Cividate Camuno. This is due not only to the nature of the subsoil, but also to the presence of evident fishing tools, such as simple nets and cages, in the rock carvings of the area. The territory of the municipality of Darfo Boario Terme includes, in addition to the river Oglio, the streams Dezzo, Rovinazza, Budrio, Re, Ogliolo and the Italsider hydroelectric power stations. Since ancient times, rivers and streams have been seriously damaged by floods. We need only recall the extremely serious disaster caused by the collapse of the Gleno dam (1 December 1923) and the flood of 16 September 1960.

== Origins of the name ==
According to Olivieri, the name is a compound word 'ad arvum', meaning 'present'. According to Mario Gallotti, it derives from the Mediterranean word 'arbe', which is the name of the Alpine river. Some scholars believe it originated from the German "Dorf" (village). Don Lino Ertani has suggested that Darfo derives from the ancient dialect word "Garf" (landslide, gravel and rock). The dialect pronunciation is actually "Darf" and would indicate the rising of the terrain of ancient Darfo and the descent of the cones of the Rovinazza and Re streams, which brought numerous boulders and debris downstream.

== Sights ==
=== Terme di Boario ===
==== History ====
Antonio Bazzini, as he wrote in "Cronaca di Lovere", claimed that the history of Boario Terme as a health resort began when the Casino di Boario was built, where "salutary magnesic and iron vitrinolate waters" were managed.

According to some scholars, however, knowledge of the waters of Boario dates back to the 15th century and led some doctors to study their alleged therapeutic effects. It seems that the doctor and naturalist Paracelsus (1493–1541) also visited the area. In 1700, when the physician Francesco Roncalli Parolino wrote in his paper 'De acquis brixianis', in 1724 to be precise, a remarkable revival took place. Roncalli himself reiterated the effectiveness of the "aquae bogiarianae" in "Europae Medicina" (1747).

In the 19th century, Ottavio Ferrario (1840) conducted new research and the first chemical analyses. Alessandro Manzoni wrote to Giovanni Morelli, a doctor from Bergamo, on 16 December 1845: "I have reason to regret not having taken advantage of the kind and cordial exhibition you gave me to obtain Boario's water directly from the owner of the land"

In 1857, dr. Biffi, the first medical scientist of the Austrian lieutenant in Lombardy described it as "the most active in Lombardy". However, according to Cantù, the revaluation of the waters of Boario came about due to doctor Zattini of Darfo in 1858. Since then, more people have been coming to Boario to use the hot springs, but staying in nearby villages such as Darfo, Corna, Esine, and others. In 1906 the waters of Boario were revalued. Since then, the first spa building with features such as an Art Nouveau dome was built and, in 1906, the Hotel Terme was also built, followed by the construction of other hotels.

In 1914, with the construction of a thermal spa, the therapeutic qualities of the waters was scientifically and methodically developed. As a result of this development, Royal Decree No. 765 of 15 April 1926 elevated Boario to the status of Autonomous Board of Health.

Between 1951 and 1952, a new spring was discovered, now called Fausta, in honour of its discoverer Dr Fausto Cardio.

A few years later, with the extension of the park, the spa was upgraded and a new pavilion and an auditorium were added.

This small spa also survived the flood that hit Boario on the night of 17 September 1960.

In 1964, a new spa named after Alessandro Manzoni was opened. In 1965 the old spa establishment, dedicated to Adolfo Ferrata, was enlarged and modernised. New and modern hotels and guesthouses increased the accommodation capacity of Boario Terme.

The thermal spring is located in a large park, in the middle of shady avenues, lawns and flowerbeds, dominated by the steep rocky walls of Monte Erbanno.

After three centuries of therapeutic use, the Boario spa still retains a high quality, as certified by CerAm, the European Mineral Water Research Centre in 2010.

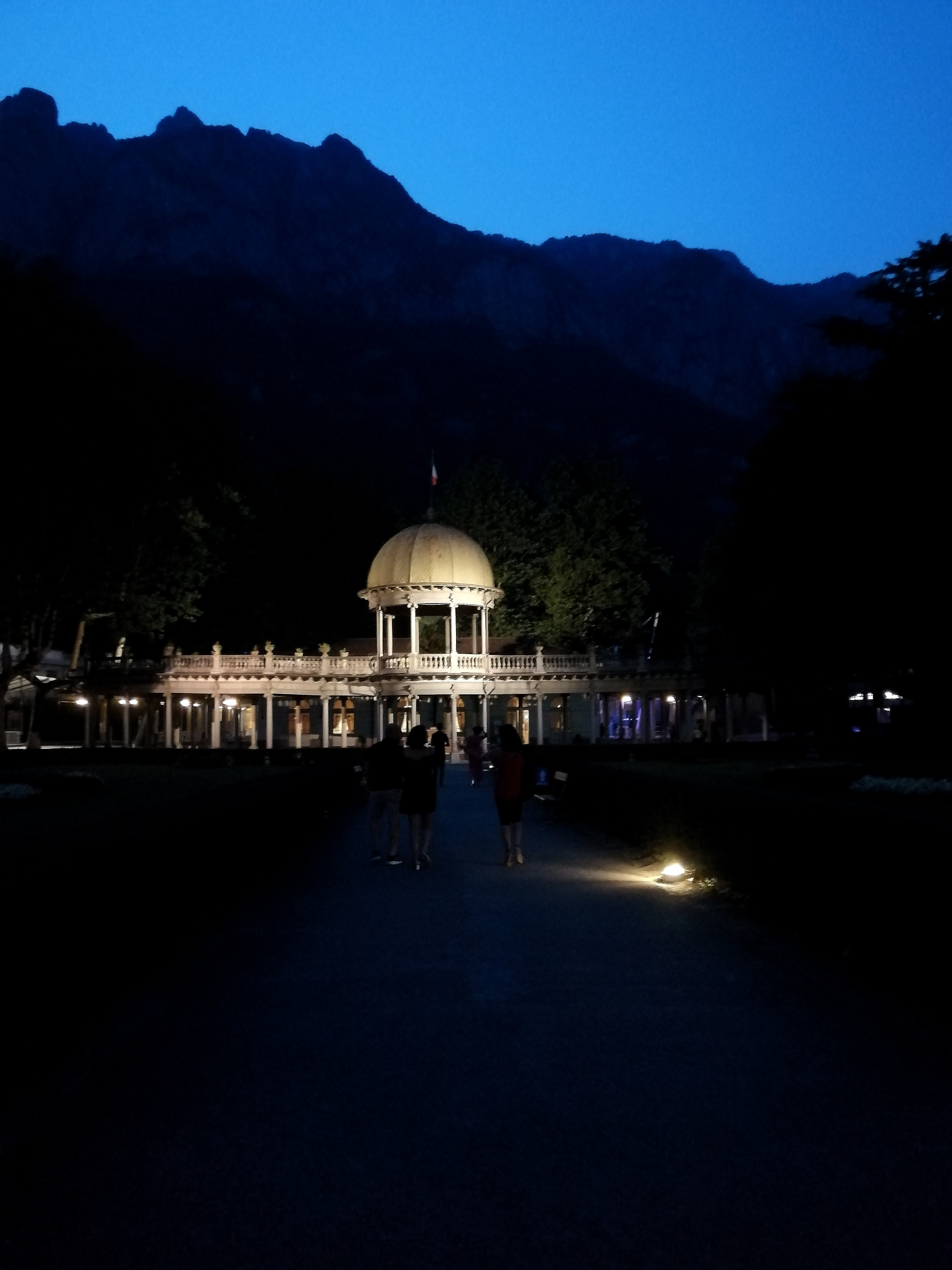
Dome of the Thermal Baths of Darfo Boario Terme

==== The Dome ====
The Liberty dome, the emblem of Terme di Boario, is made of white marble, and the balcony is supported by pillars with Ionic capitals. Its history can be traced back to 1913: it was once the seat of the orchestra, while today it is considered a sign and symbol of the Terme di Boario and the municipality in which it is located, Darfo Boario Terme. The dome is a symbol of the Padiglione dell'Antica Fonte, and was built a century ago by the architect Amerigo Marazzi, becoming an example of Art Nouveau architecture.

==== Park ====
There is a centuries-old park, comprising 130,000 square metres of land where mineral water is collected.

==== Springs ====
The thermal waters have their natural foundations in the Alps surrounding the Camonica Valley. By coming into contact with various mineral elements, the waters are purified and enriched. The water contains sulphate, bicarbonate, calcium and magnesium cold (13-15 °C). The four springs of the Terme di Boario are differentiated by the concentration of salts, a characteristic that allows them to have different allegedly therapeutic functions such as treatment, rehabilitation and prevention.

According to the Terme di Barrio's website, the four springs mineral properties are as follows:

- Acqua Antica Fonte, this water contains a high percentage of sulphate, bicarbonate and calcium
- Acqua Fausta
- 'Acqua Igea
- Acqua Boario, has a low sodium content, and also contains calcium and magnesium
