= Andrea Fantoni =

Italian sculptor

- Andrea Fantoni
- Born: 25 August 1659; Rovetta, Bergamo, Republic of Venice
- Died: 6 July 1734 (aged 74); Bergamo, Republic of Venice
- Known for: Sculpture
- Movement: Baroque; Rococo

Andrea Fantoni (August 25, 1659 – July 6, 1734) was an Italian sculptor and woodcarver of the late-Baroque period, active in the region near Bergamo.

== Biography ==
Andrea Fantoni was born in Rovetta on August 26, 1659. He was the eldest son of the sculptor and carver Grazioso Fantoni (1630–93) and trained in his father’s flourishing workshop, which played a leading part in the supply of church furnishings in Bergamo, Parma and the surrounding provinces. In 1674 documents record Andrea in Parma, but in 1675 he was at Edolo, where he is recorded as an apprentice in the workshop of Pietro Ramus (1639–1682), a sculptor active in Val Camonica. It is thought that around 1678 he went to Venice to work in the workshop of the Genoese sculptor Filippo Parodi, a pupil of Bernini and a friend of Pierre Puget. Certainly Fantoni’s work gives stylistic evidence of contacts with Genoese and Venetian circles.

In 1679 he returned to Rovetta, taking part from the early 1680s in a process of extensive stylistic modernization in the family workshop. This change can be seen in the contrast between Grazioso’s carved and inlaid wooden decorations and furnishings in the first sacristy (1679) at San Martino, Alzano Lombardo, which are Baroque in form and Counter-Reformation in their iconography, and Fantoni’s in the second sacristy (1692), which is already Rococo in form and more allusive in its language. Andrea Fantoni displayed a particular gift for wooden furniture, which he made for churches, convents and private houses. Because of their characteristically rich ornamentation (drapery, volutes, leaves, flowers and putti), these works have been called ‘living furniture’ and they, too, display a typically 18th-century taste, with a tendency towards blurring the line between objects designed for religious purposes and those intended for lay use.

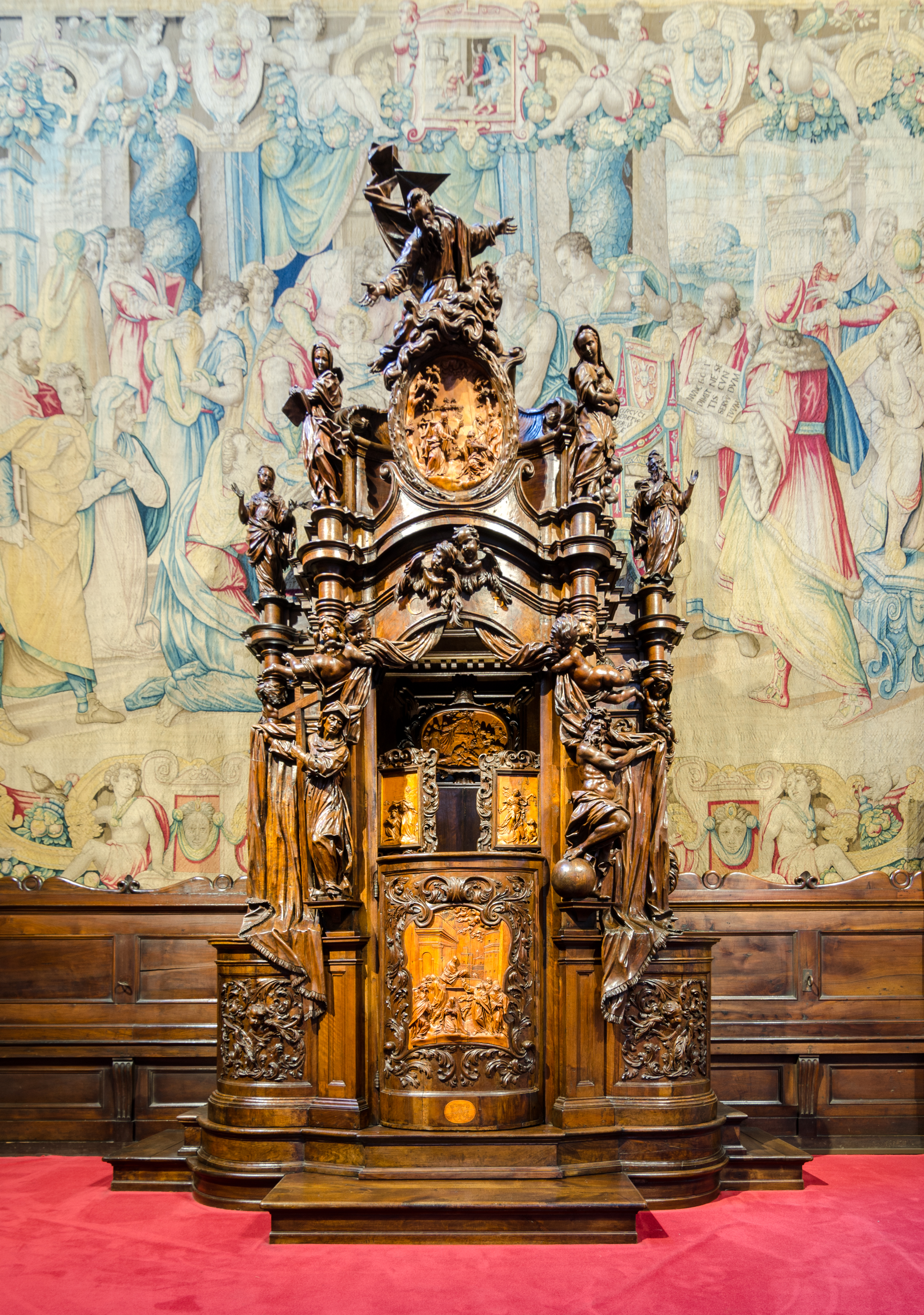
Confessional (1704) by Fantoni in the Basilica of Santa Maria Maggiore, Bergamo

Two outstanding examples of these virtuoso achievements, both originally designed for Bergamo Cathedral, are the confessional (1704; Santa Maria Maggiore, Bergamo) and the bishop’s throne (1705). Both are made of walnut, inset with figured reliefs in boxwood. The celebrated pulpit (1711) designed by Giovan Battista Caniana in San Martino at Alzano Lombardo was decorated by Fantoni with rich, coloured marble reliefs, medallions and statues of telamones. This work, the wooden model of which is preserved in the Museo Fantoni, Rovetta, gave rise to a series of similar pulpits in the Bergamo region (e.g. Ardesio, parish church; Castione della Presolana, parish church). Another major part of the varied range of activities undertaken by Fantoni and the workshop was the production of devotional works. An important example of this genre is the sepulchre with scenes from the Passion in polychromed wood made for the parish church at Zone in 1691. Also mentioned in contemporary documents is a considerable output of ivory and boxwood Crucifixes, several fine examples of which have survived, such as those in the parish church at Romano Lombardo (1700, boxwood) and in the Accademia Carrara, Bergamo (c. 1699–1711; wood). In these works Fantoni used models inspired by the works of Bernini and Alessandro Algardi to create a typology in keeping with 18th-century taste.

Fantoni also worked as a monumental sculptor—his statues of St. John the Baptist and Mary Magdalene (both 1716; marble) in the sanctuary of Santa Maria delle Grazie, Crema show the influence of Parodi’s style – and he is known to have been active as an architect, producing schemes for the churches at Onore and Cerete, and for Sant'Andrea in Val di Scalve, as well as an unrealized project for the façade of San Martino at Alzano. Drawings for these, influenced by Giovan Battista Caniana, and for his sculptural work are in the Museo Fantoni at Rovetta. The Fantoni workshop continued to be active until c. 1817.

== Bibliography ==
- Pedrocchi, Anna Maria (1994). "Fantoni, Andrea". Dizionario Biografico degli Italiani (in Italian). Vol. 44: Fabron–Farina. Rome: Istituto dell'Enciclopedia Italiana. ISBN 978-88-12-00032-6.
