= Lake Moro =

Lake Moro may refer to:

- Lake Moro (Valle Brembana)
- Lake Moro (Valle Camonica)
