= Songavazzo =

- Comune
- Comune di Songavazzo
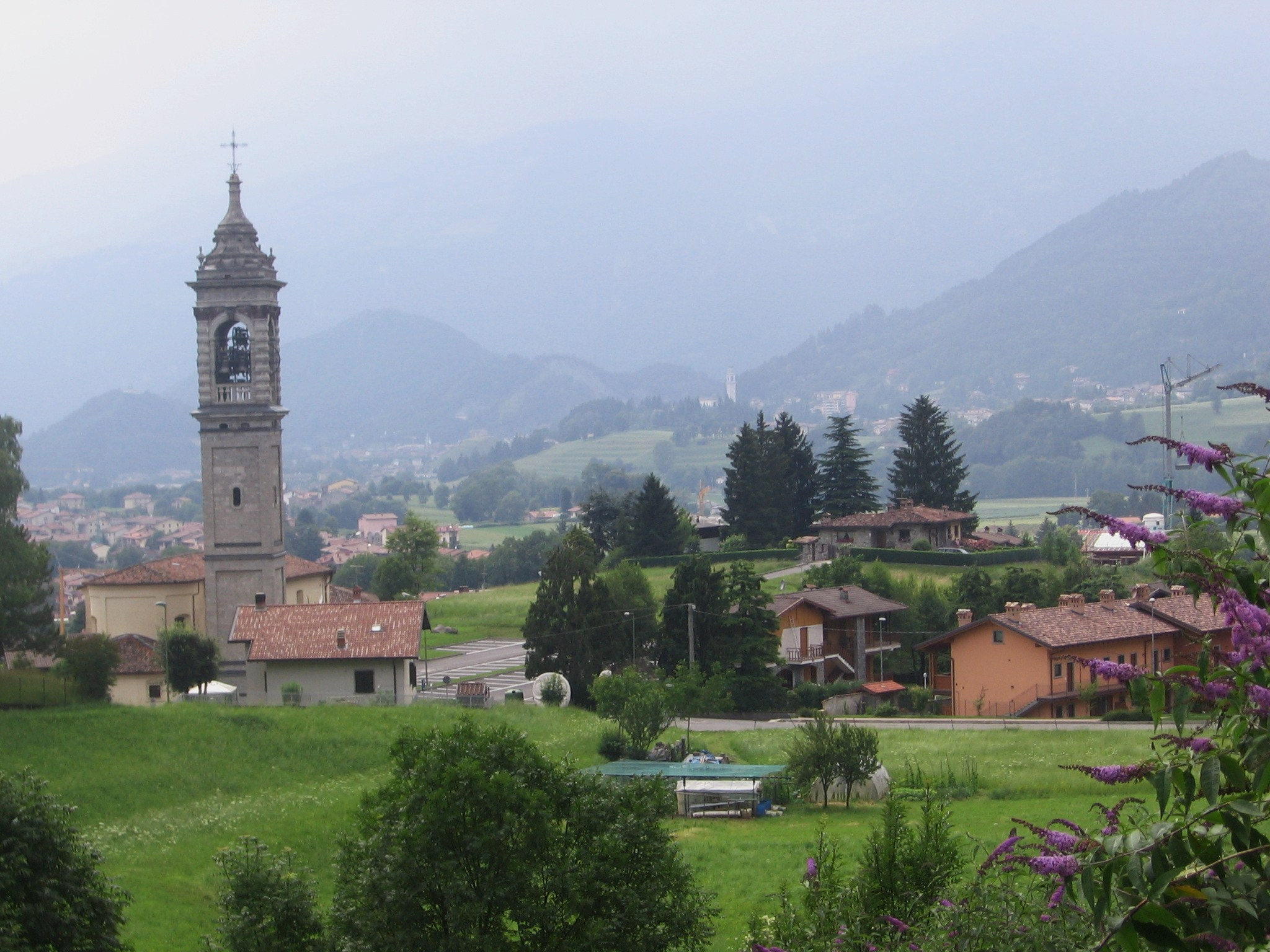
- Songavazzo

- Location within Italy Location within Lombardy
- Coordinates: 45°53′N 9°59′E
- Country: Italy
- Region: Lombardy
- Province: Province of Bergamo (BG)

Area
  - Total: 12.7 km^{2} (4.9 sq mi)
- Elevation: 640 m (2,100 ft)

Population (Dec. 2004)
  - Total: 662
  - Density: 52.1/km^{2} (135/sq mi)
- Demonym: Songavazzesi
- Time zone: UTC+1 (CET)
  - Summer (DST): UTC+2 (CEST)
- Postal code: 24020
- Dialing code: 0346

Songavazzo (Bergamasque: Songaàss) is a comune (municipality) in the Province of Bergamo in the Italian region of Lombardy, located about 80 kilometres (50 mi) northeast of Milan and about 30 kilometres (19 mi) northeast of Bergamo. As of 31 December 2004, it had a population of 662 and an area of 12.7 square kilometres (4.9 mi^{2}).

Songavazzo borders the following municipalities: Bossico, Castione della Presolana, Cerete, Costa Volpino, Fino del Monte, Onore, Rogno, Rovetta.

== Demographic evolution ==
Historical population

Year	Pop.	±%
1861	558	—
1871	532	−4.7%
1881	590	+10.9%
1901	611	+3.6%
1911	712	+16.5%

Year	Pop.	±%
1921	736	+3.4%
1931	714	−3.0%
1936	600	−16.0%
1951	641	+6.8%
1961	556	−13.3%

Year	Pop.	±%
1971	477	−14.2%
1981	548	+14.9%
1991	539	−1.6%
2001	616	+14.3%

Source: Data from ISTAT
