= Poiatti =

Italian pasta manufacturer

Poiatti S.p.A.
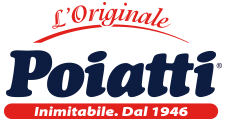
- Company type: Private (family-owned)
- Industry: Food processing
- Founded: 1946; 80 years ago
- Founder: Domenico Poiatti
- Headquarters: Mazara del Vallo, Sicily, Italy
- Area served: Worldwide
- Products: Pasta
- Revenue: ▲€ 60 millions (2019)
- Website: www.poiatti.it

Poiatti S.p.A. is an Italian pasta manufacturing company based in Mazara del Vallo, Sicily.

== History ==
In 1940, Domenico Poiatti (born 1921) left his native Pian D'Artogne, Lombardy, for Mazara del Vallo, Sicily, to serve in the military. After getting married, he briefly returned with his family to his native town, where he worked in his uncle's old water-fed mill grinding corn and dried chestnuts. Poiatti went back to Mazara in 1946, opening a grocery store and buying a small artisan pasta factory that would become the current company.

== Production ==
Poiatti produces 100 forms of pasta with Sicilian wheat, including durum wheat semolina, egg pasta, bronze-extruded pasta and couscous. Poiatti S.p.A. has a production plant in Mazara del Vallo, with more than 60 employees.

== Distribution ==
In Italy, the Poiatti pasta is marketed and distributed directly by the company. In the foreign market (Europe, United States, Canada, Australia and Brazil) the distribution is managed by local partners.
