= Colere =

- Comune
- Comune di Colere
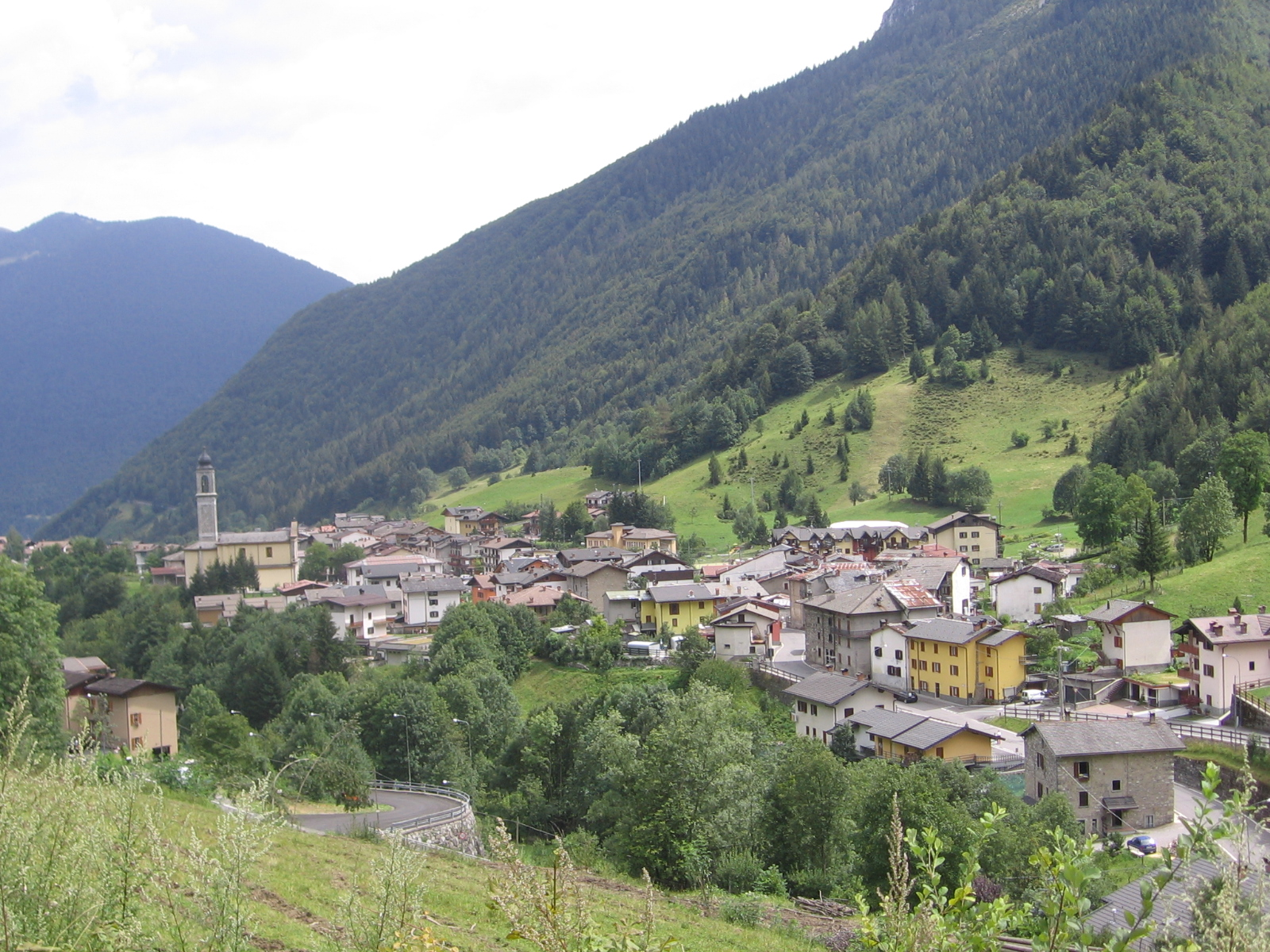

- Location within Italy Location within Lombardy
- Coordinates: 45°58′N 10°5′E
- Country: Italy
- Region: Lombardy
- Province: Province of Bergamo (BG)

Area
  - Total: 18.8 km^{2} (7.3 sq mi)
- Elevation: 1,013 m (3,323 ft)

Population (Dec. 2004)
  - Total: 1,147
  - Density: 61.0/km^{2} (158/sq mi)
- Demonym: Coleresi
- Time zone: UTC+1 (CET)
  - Summer (DST): UTC+2 (CEST)
- Postal code: 24020
- Dialing code: 0346

Colere (Bergamasque: Còler) is a comune (municipality) in the Province of Bergamo in the Italian region of Lombardy, located about 90 kilometres (56 mi) northeast of Milan and about 45 kilometres (28 mi) northeast of Bergamo. As of 31 December 2004, it had a population of 1,147 and an area of 18.8 square kilometres (7.3 mi^{2}).

Colere borders the following municipalities: Angolo Terme, Azzone, Castione della Presolana, Rovetta, Vilminore di Scalve.

== Demographic evolution ==
Historical population

Year	Pop.	±%
1861	677	—
1871	780	+15.2%
1881	787	+0.9%
1901	766	−2.7%
1911	964	+25.8%

Year	Pop.	±%
1921	1,008	+4.6%
1931	1,074	+6.5%
1936	975	−9.2%
1951	1,285	+31.8%
1961	1,346	+4.7%

Year	Pop.	±%
1971	1,148	−14.7%
1981	1,106	−3.7%
1991	1,110	+0.4%
2001	1,143	+3.0%

Source: Data from ISTAT
