= Rogno =

- Comune
- Comune di Rogno
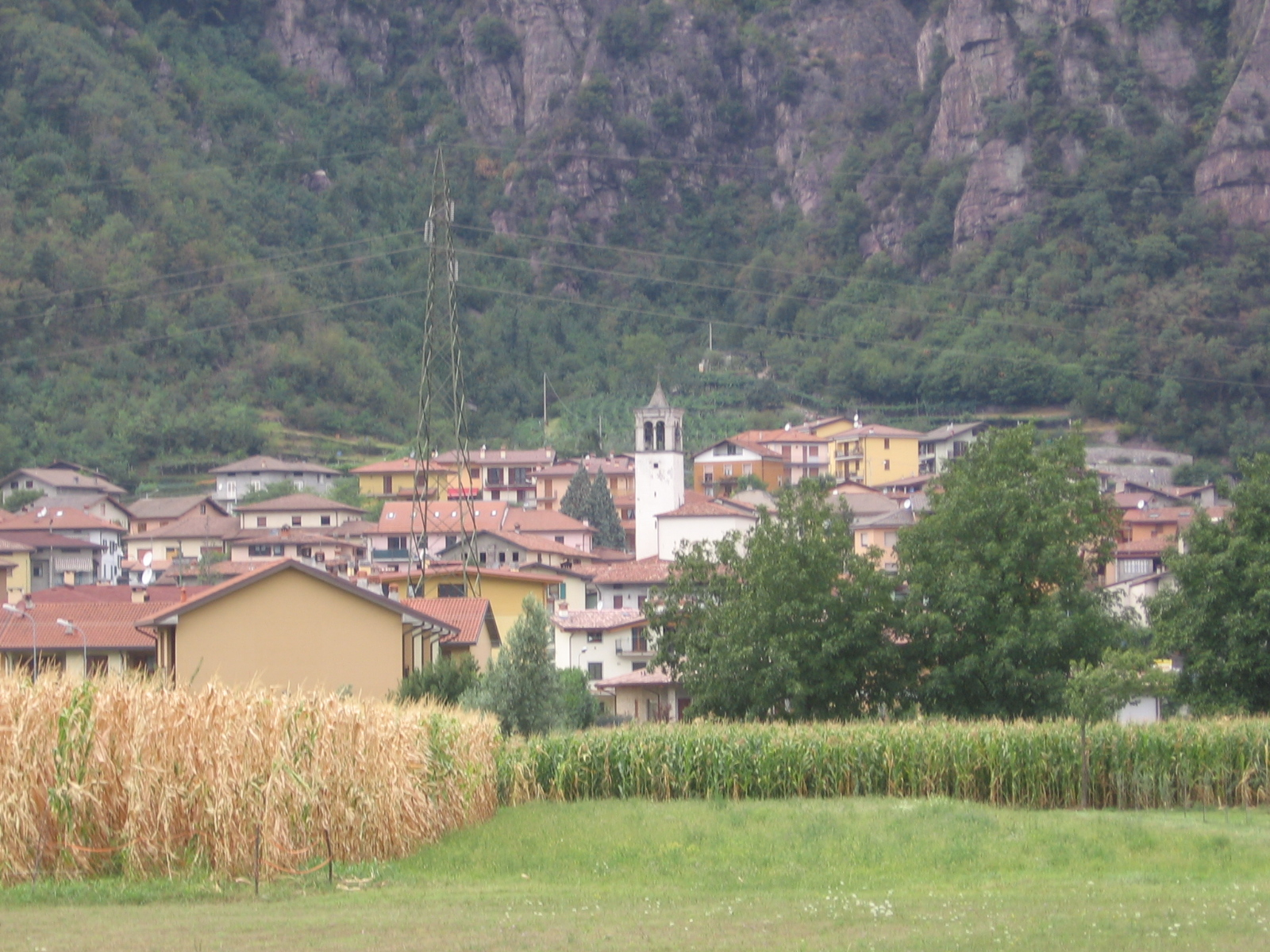

- Coat of arms

- Location within Italy Location within Lombardy
- Coordinates: 45°51′27″N 10°7′59″E
- Country: Italy
- Region: Lombardy
- Province: Bergamo (BG)
- Frazioni: Bessimo Inferiore, Castelfranco, Monti, San Vigilio

Government
  - Mayor: Cristian Molinari

Area
  - Total: 15.6 km^{2} (6.0 sq mi)
- Elevation: 215 m (705 ft)

Population (31 December 2019)
  - Total: 3,909
  - Density: 251/km^{2} (649/sq mi)
- Demonym: Rognesi
- Time zone: UTC+1 (CET)
  - Summer (DST): UTC+2 (CEST)
- Postal code: 24060
- Dialing code: 035
- Website: Official website

Rogno (Camuno Lombard: Rógn; Bergamasque: Rògn) is a comune (municipality) in the Province of Bergamo in the Italian region of Lombardy, located about 90 kilometres (56 mi) northeast of Milan and about 40 kilometres (25 mi) northeast of Bergamo, in the Val Camonica.

Rogno borders the following municipalities: Angolo Terme, Artogne, Castione della Presolana, Costa Volpino, Darfo Boario Terme, Pian Camuno, Songavazzo.

== Twin towns ==
Rogno is twinned with:

- Clavesana, Italy
