= Bossico =

- Comune
- Comune di Bossico
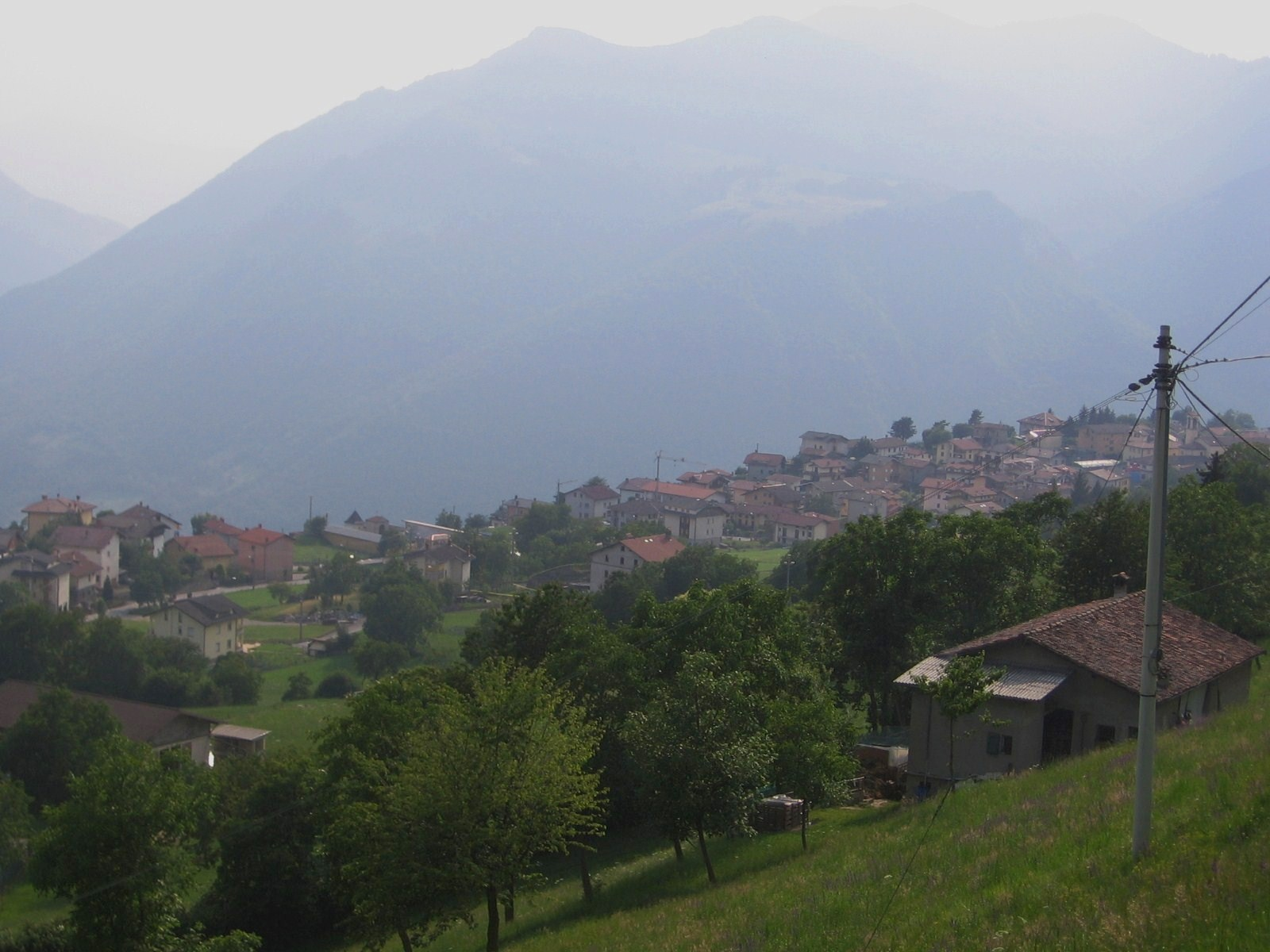
- View of Bossico

- Coat of arms

- Location within Italy Location within Lombardy
- Coordinates: 45°50′N 10°3′E
- Country: Italy
- Region: Lombardy
- Province: Bergamo (BG)

Government
  - Mayor: Daria Schiavi

Area
  - Total: 7.09 km^{2} (2.74 sq mi)
- Elevation: 865 m (2,838 ft)

Population (30 April 2017)
  - Total: 994
  - Density: 140/km^{2} (363/sq mi)
- Demonym: Bossichesi
- Time zone: UTC+1 (CET)
  - Summer (DST): UTC+2 (CEST)
- Postal code: 24060
- Dialing code: 035
- Website: Official website

Bossico (Bergamasque: Bödech) is a comune (municipality) in the Province of Bergamo in the Italian region of Lombardy, located about 80 kilometres (50 mi) northeast of Milan and about 35 kilometres (22 mi) northeast of Bergamo.

Bossico borders the following municipalities: Cerete, Costa Volpino, Lovere, Songavazzo, Sovere.

== Twin towns ==
Bossico is twinned with:

- Meyrié, France (1982)
