= Giacomo Sozzi =

Italian sculptor

Giacomo Sozzi was a late-19th century Italian sculptor, active mainly in Lombardy and Bergamo.

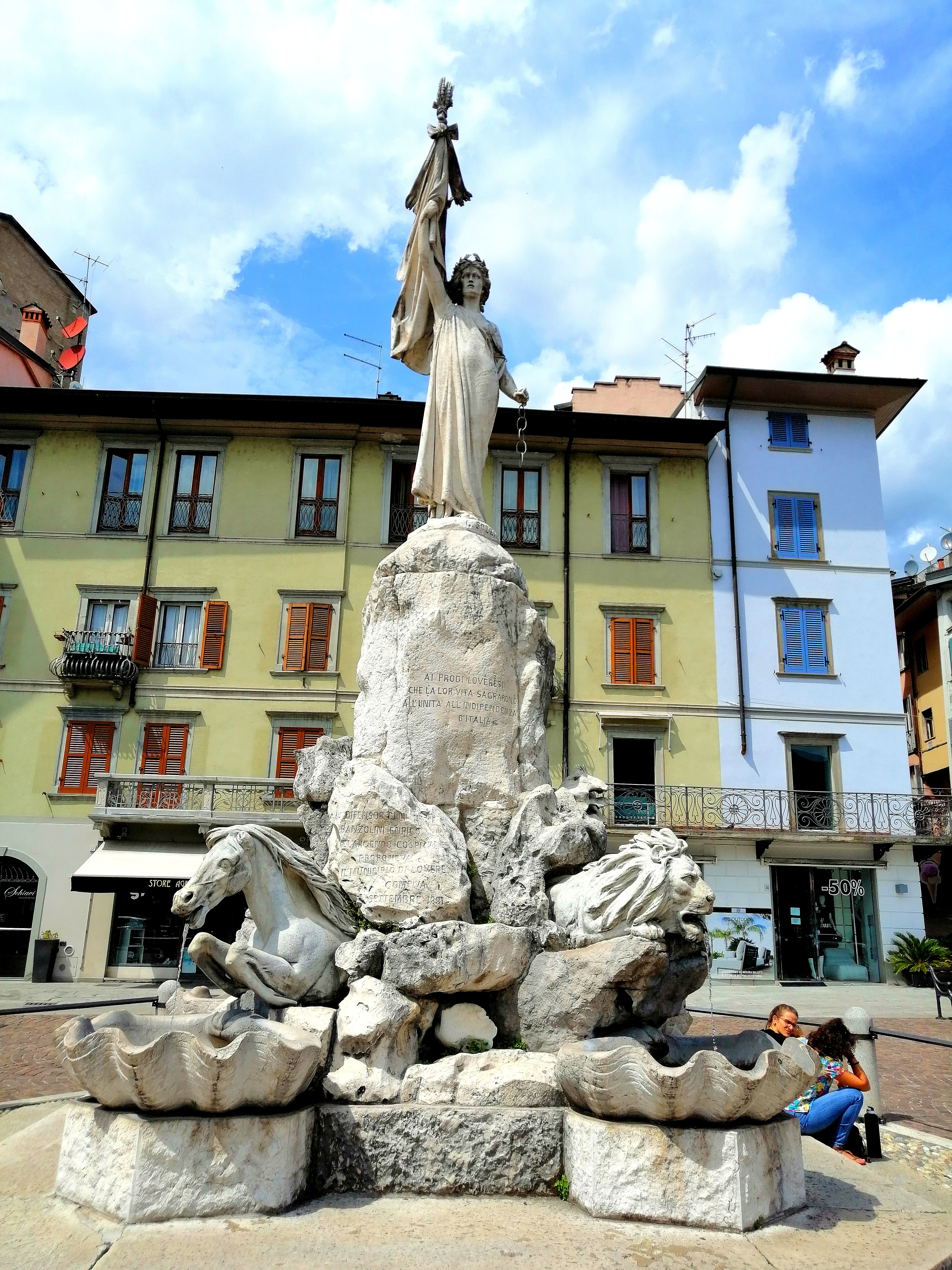
Fountain and Monument in Lovere dedicated to the Unity and Independence of Italy, surmounted by a statue of Liberty by Sozzi.

He was born in Castione, province of Bergamo. In 1872, he exhibited in Milan: Fanciullo al Bagno. In 1881, in the same city exhibited three stucco statues: Cammilla; Young Bacchante; and Springtime. At the 1883 Fine Art Exposition in Rome, he exhibited a marble statue titled Night before exam; and a bust in marble titled The Wife. These two works were also exhibited in 1884 in Turin, alongside a stucco statue: Cippelli merli. The latter was also exhibited in Milan at the Mostra of 1880. He also sculpted the Monument of Liberty in Piazza Tredici martiri in Lovere.
