= Fino del Monte =

- Comune
- Comune di Fino del Monte
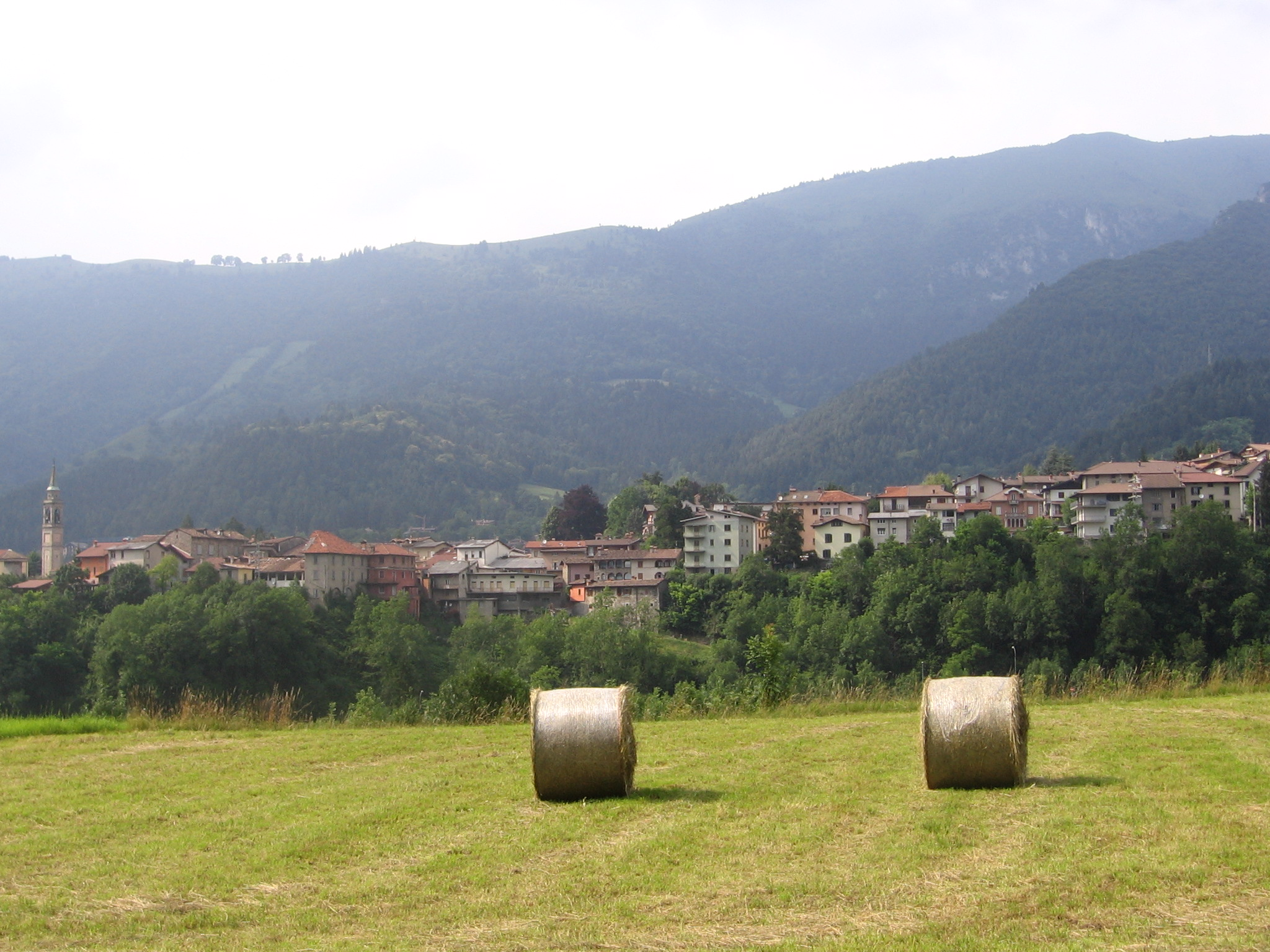
- Fino del Monte

- Location within Italy Location within Lombardy
- Coordinates: 45°53′N 10°2′E
- Country: Italy
- Region: Lombardy
- Province: Province of Bergamo (BG)

Area
  - Total: 4.4 km^{2} (1.7 sq mi)
- Elevation: 662 m (2,172 ft)

Population (Dec. 2004)
  - Total: 1,156
  - Density: 260/km^{2} (680/sq mi)
- Demonym: Finesi
- Time zone: UTC+1 (CET)
  - Summer (DST): UTC+2 (CEST)
- Postal code: 24020
- Dialing code: 0346

Fino del Monte (Bergamasque: Fì dol Mùt) is a comune (municipality) in the Province of Bergamo in the Italian region of Lombardy, located about 80 kilometres (50 mi) northeast of Milan and about 35 kilometres (22 mi) northeast of Bergamo. As of 31 December 2004, it had a population of 1,156 and an area of 4.4 square kilometres (1.7 mi^{2}).

Fino del Monte borders the following municipalities: Castione della Presolana, Onore, Rovetta, Songavazzo.

== Demographic evolution ==
Historical population

Year	Pop.	±%
1861	441	—
1871	482	+9.3%
1881	520	+7.9%
1901	673	+29.4%
1911	861	+27.9%

Year	Pop.	±%
1921	1,037	+20.4%
1931	940	−9.4%
1936	758	−19.4%
1951	907	+19.7%
1961	899	−0.9%

Year	Pop.	±%
1971	820	−8.8%
1981	833	+1.6%
1991	977	+17.3%
2001	1,116	+14.2%

Source: Data from ISTAT

== Geography ==
The municipality covers an area of 436 ha, with a relevant difference in altitude, from around 600 m a.s.l (in the proximity of the Borlezza stream) to 1642 m (at the top of Mount Parè). Most of the built-up area sits on alluvial gravel deposits.

=== Climate ===
According to the Köppen and Geiger climate classification, Fino del Monte features a mid-latitude temperate oceanic climate (Cfb).
