= Castione della Presolana =

- Comune
- Comune di Castione della Presolana
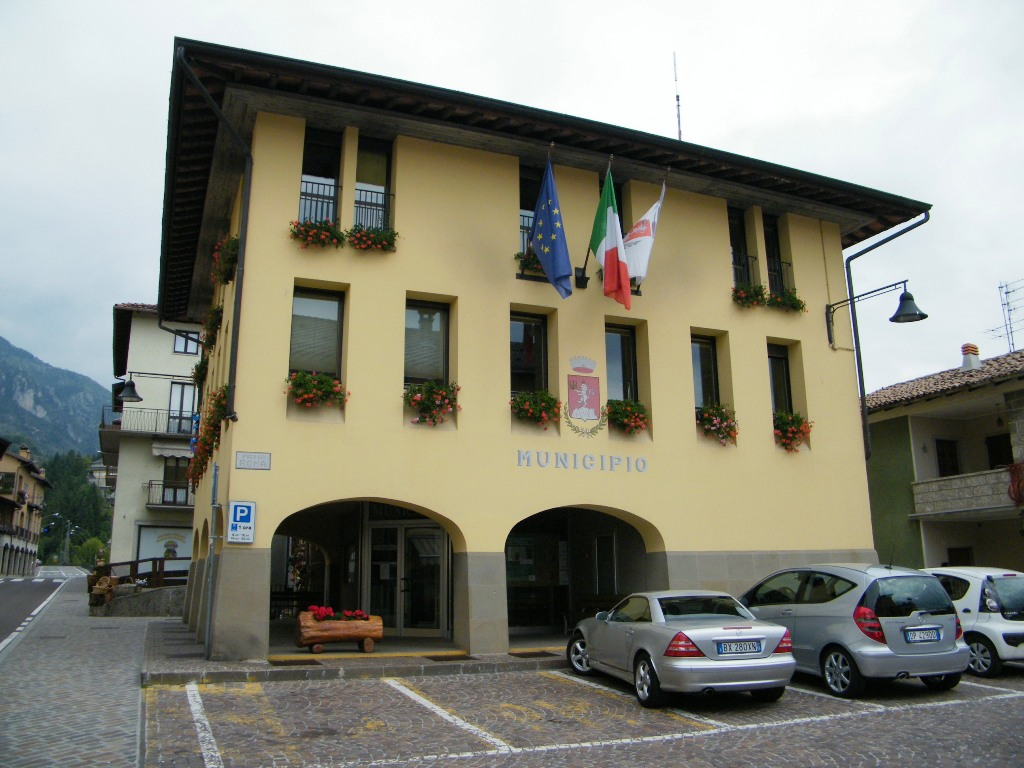
- Town hall

- Location within Italy Location within Lombardy
- Coordinates: 45°54′N 10°2′E
- Country: Italy
- Region: Lombardy
- Province: Province of Bergamo (BG)
- Frazioni: bratto - dorga

Government
  - Mayor: Mauro Pezzoli

Area
  - Total: 42.6 km^{2} (16.4 sq mi)
- Highest elevation: 2,521 m (8,271 ft)
- Lowest elevation: 870 m (2,850 ft)

Population (Dec. 2004)
  - Total: 3,379
  - Density: 79.3/km^{2} (205/sq mi)
- Demonym: Castionesi
- Time zone: UTC+1 (CET)
  - Summer (DST): UTC+2 (CEST)
- Postal code: 24020
- Dialing code: 0346
- Patron saint: Alessandro
- Saint day: 26 agosto
- Website: www.presolana.it

Castione della Presolana (Bergamasque: Cas-ciù or Castiù) is a comune (municipality) in the Province of Bergamo in the Italian region of Lombardy, located about 80 kilometres (50 mi) northeast of Milan and about 35 kilometres (22 mi) northeast of Bergamo. As of 31 December 2004, it had a population of 3,379 and an area of 42.6 square kilometres (16.4 mi^{2}).

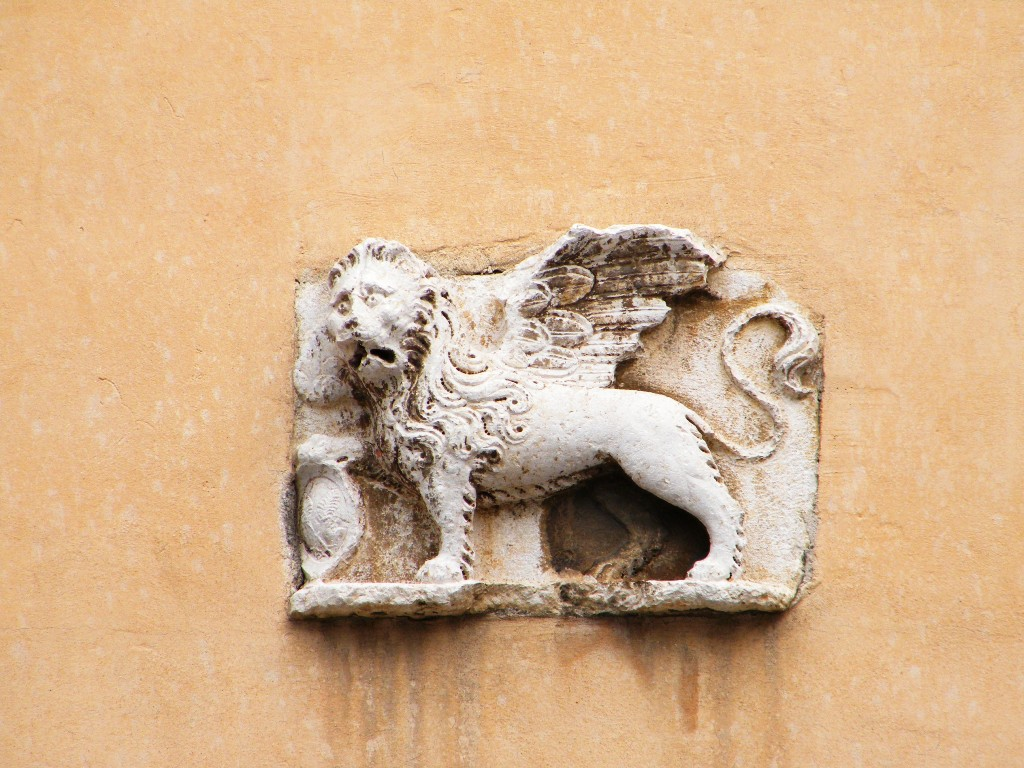
San Marco's Lion, a reminder of the Venetian domination

Castione della Presolana borders the following municipalities: Angolo Terme, Colere, Fino del Monte, Onore, Rogno, Rovetta, Songavazzo.

== Demographic evolution ==
Historical population

| Year | Pop. | ±% |
|---|---|---|
| 1861 | 1,926 | — |
| 1871 | 2,095 | +8.8% |
| 1881 | 2,145 | +2.4% |
| 1901 | 1,562 | −27.2% |
| 1911 | 2,227 | +42.6% |

| Year | Pop. | ±% |
|---|---|---|
| 1921 | 2,174 | −2.4% |
| 1931 | 2,169 | −0.2% |
| 1936 | 2,001 | −7.7% |
| 1951 | 2,423 | +21.1% |
| 1961 | 2,470 | +1.9% |

| Year | Pop. | ±% |
|---|---|---|
| 1971 | 2,814 | +13.9% |
| 1981 | 3,078 | +9.4% |
| 1991 | 3,161 | +2.7% |
| 2001 | 3,291 | +4.1% |

Source: Data from ISTAT

== Twin towns ==
Castione della Presolana is twinned with:

- Bons-en-Chablais, France
- Adenau, Germany

== Notable people ==
- Giacomo Sozzi, late-19th century Italian sculptor
