= Sovere =

- Comune
- Comune di Sovere
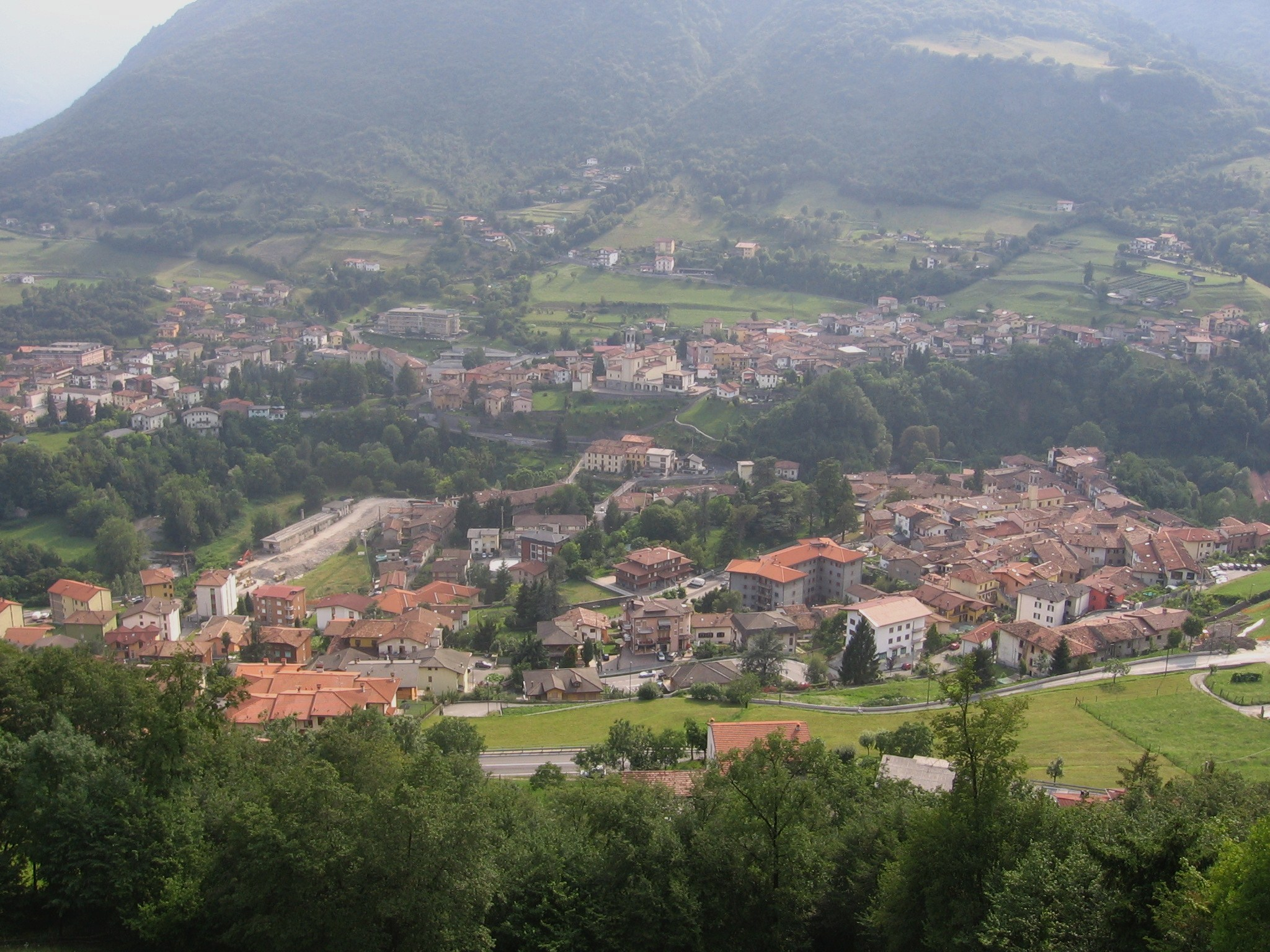
- Sovere

- Coat of arms

- Location within Italy Location within Lombardy
- Coordinates: 45°49′N 10°2′E
- Country: Italy
- Region: Lombardy
- Province: Bergamo (BG)
- Frazioni: Sellere, Piazza, San Gregorio, Possimo

Government
  - Mayor: Francesco Filippini

Area
  - Total: 18.02 km^{2} (6.96 sq mi)
- Elevation: 375 m (1,230 ft)

Population (31 December 2013)
  - Total: 5,505
  - Density: 305.5/km^{2} (791.2/sq mi)
- Demonym: Soveresi
- Time zone: UTC+1 (CET)
  - Summer (DST): UTC+2 (CEST)
- Postal code: 24060
- Dialing code: 035
- Patron saint: St. Martin of Tours
- Saint day: November 11
- Website: Official website

Sovere (Bergamasque: Sóer) is a comune (municipality) in the province of Bergamo in the Italian region of Lombardy, located about 100 kilometres (62 mi) northeast of Milan and about 38 kilometres (24 mi) northeast of Bergamo.

Sovere borders the following municipalities: Bossico, Cerete, Endine Gaiano, Gandino, Lovere, Pianico, Solto Collina.
