= Solto Collina =

- Comune
- Comune di Solto Collina
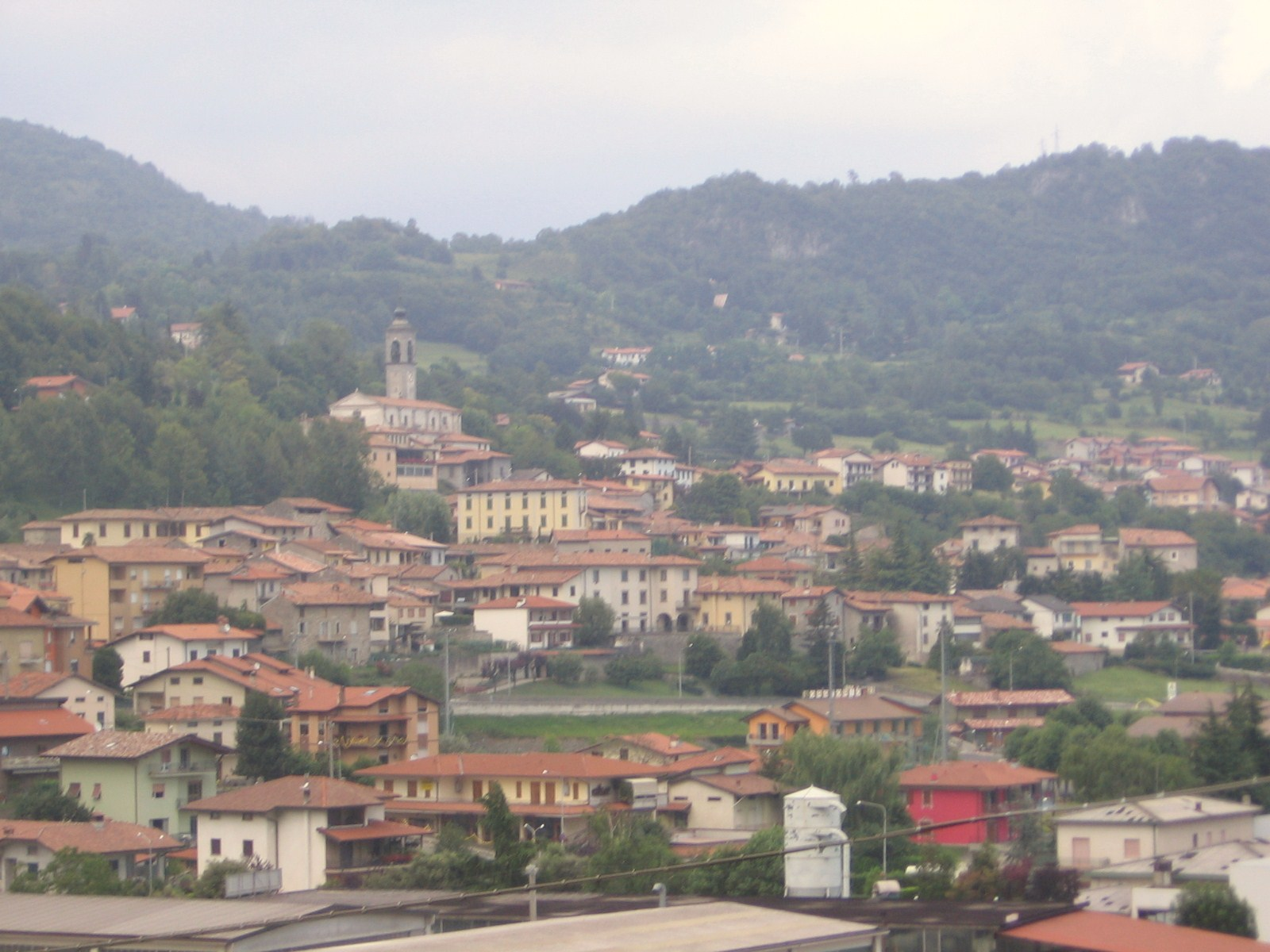
- Solto Collina

- Location within Italy Location within Lombardy
- Coordinates: 45°47′N 10°1′E
- Country: Italy
- Region: Lombardy
- Province: Bergamo (BG)

Government
  - Mayor: Maurizio Esti

Area
  - Total: 12.0 km^{2} (4.6 sq mi)
- Elevation: 449 m (1,473 ft)

Population (31 December 2010)
  - Total: 1,709
  - Density: 142/km^{2} (369/sq mi)
- Demonym: Soltesi
- Time zone: UTC+1 (CET)
  - Summer (DST): UTC+2 (CEST)
- Postal code: 24060
- Dialing code: 035
- Website: Official website

Solto Collina (Bergamasque: Sólt) is a comune (municipality) in the Province of Bergamo in the Italian region of Lombardy, located about 80 kilometres (50 mi) northeast of Milan and about 30 kilometres (19 mi) northeast of Bergamo.

Solto Collina borders the following municipalities: Castro, Endine Gaiano, Fonteno, Pianico, Pisogne, Riva di Solto, Sovere.
