= Pianico =

- Comune
- Comune di Pianico
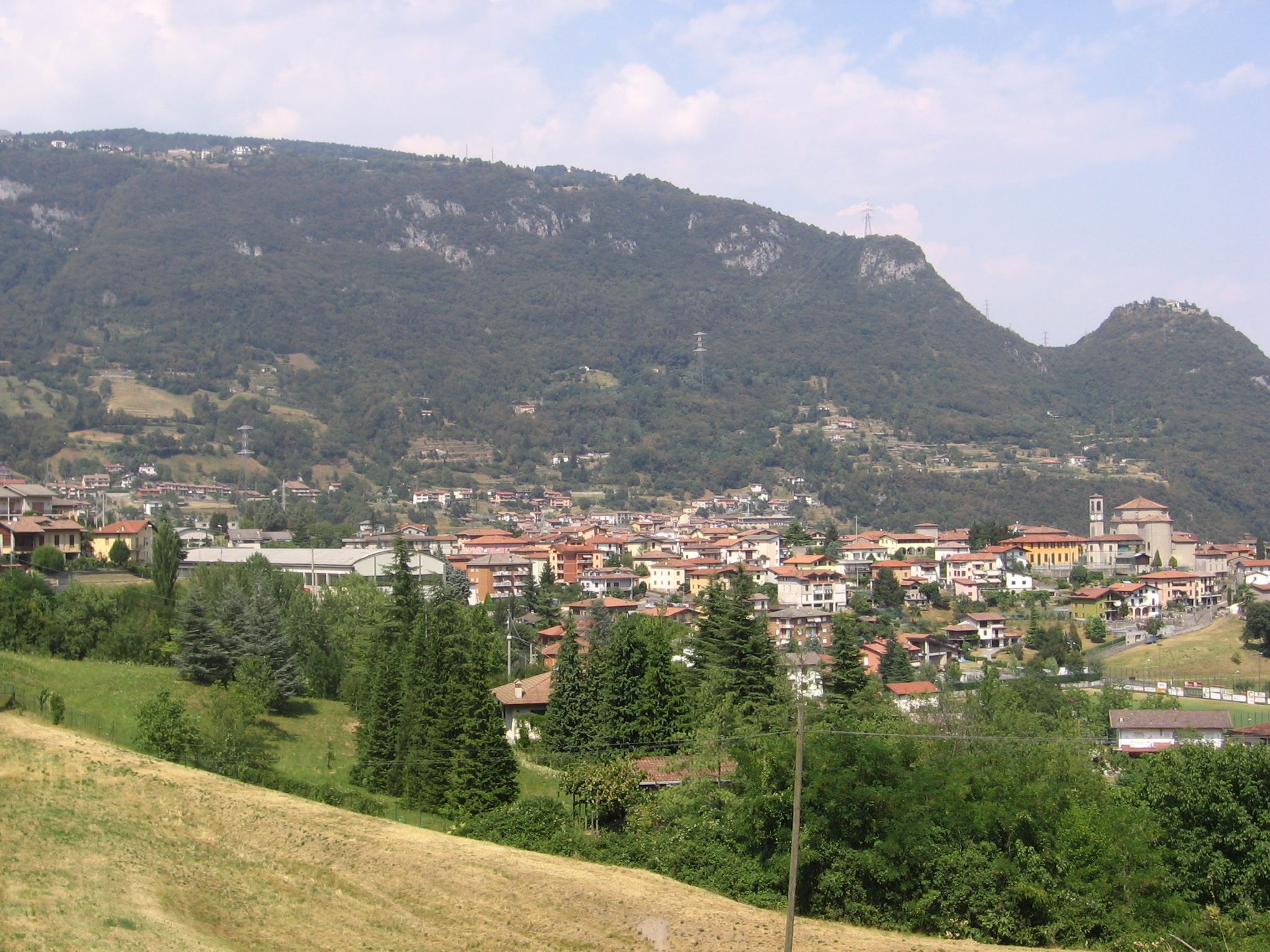
- Pianico

- Location within Italy Location within Lombardy
- Coordinates: 45°49′N 10°3′E
- Country: Italy
- Region: Lombardy
- Province: Province of Bergamo (BG)

Government
  - Mayor: Maurizio Pezzoli

Area
  - Total: 2.6 km^{2} (1.0 sq mi)
- Elevation: 328 m (1,076 ft)

Population (Dec. 2004)
  - Total: 1,403
  - Density: 540/km^{2} (1,400/sq mi)
- Demonym: Pianichesi
- Time zone: UTC+1 (CET)
  - Summer (DST): UTC+2 (CEST)
- Postal code: 24060
- Dialing code: 035

Pianico (Bergamasque: Piènech or Piànech) is a comune (municipality) in the Province of Bergamo in the Italian region of Lombardy, located about 80 kilometres (50 mi) northeast of Milan and about 35 kilometres (22 mi) northeast of Bergamo. As of 31 December 2004, it had a population of 1,403 and an area of 2.6 square kilometres (1.0 mi^{2}).

Pianico borders the following municipalities: Castro, Lovere, Solto Collina, Sovere.

== Demographic evolution ==
Historical population

Year	Pop.	±%
1861	390	—
1871	401	+2.8%
1881	410	+2.2%
1901	510	+24.4%
1911	604	+18.4%

Year	Pop.	±%
1921	731	+21.0%
1931	804	+10.0%
1936	833	+3.6%
1951	972	+16.7%
1961	1,125	+15.7%

Year	Pop.	±%
1971	1,266	+12.5%
1981	1,227	−3.1%
1991	1,266	+3.2%
2001	1,385	+9.4%

Source: Data from ISTAT
