= Castro, Lombardy =

Castro
- Comune
- Comune di Castro
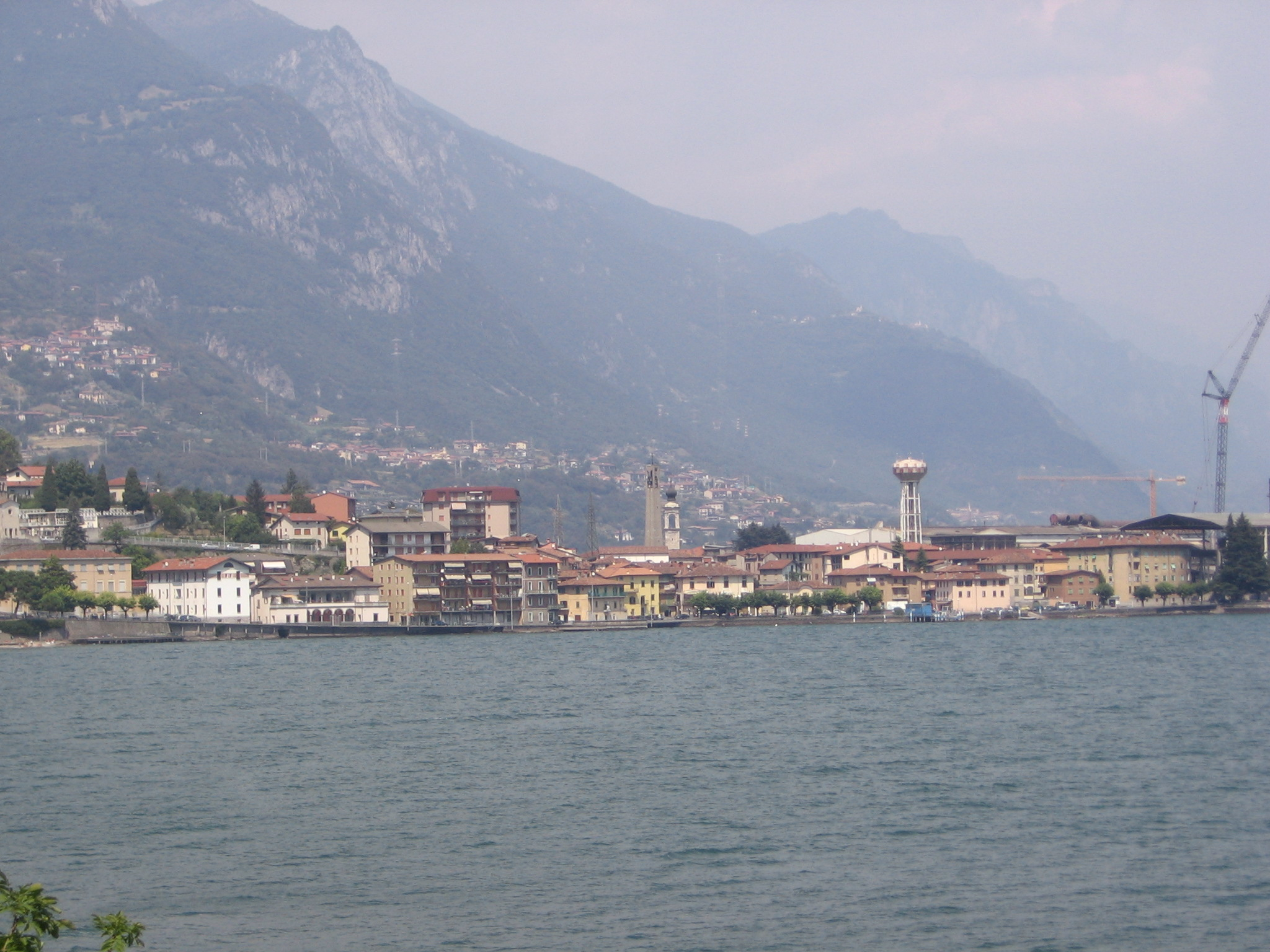
- Castro

- Location within Italy Location within Lombardy
- Coordinates: 45°48′N 10°4′E
- Country: Italy
- Region: Lombardy
- Province: Province of Bergamo (BG)

Area
  - Total: 3.5 km^{2} (1.4 sq mi)
- Elevation: 200 m (660 ft)

Population (Dec. 2004)
  - Total: 1,449
  - Density: 410/km^{2} (1,100/sq mi)
- Demonym: Castrensi
- Time zone: UTC+1 (CET)
  - Summer (DST): UTC+2 (CEST)
- Postal code: 24063
- Dialing code: 035

Castro (Bergamasque: Càster) is a comune (municipality) in the Province of Bergamo in the Italian region of Lombardy, located about 80 kilometres (50 mi) northeast of Milan and about 35 kilometres (22 mi) northeast of Bergamo on the western side of the lake Iseo. As of 31 December 2019, it had a population of 1,292 and an area of 3.5 square kilometres (1.4 mi^{2}).

Castro borders the following municipalities: Lovere, Pianico, Pisogne, Solto Collina.

== Demographic evolution ==
Historical population

Year	Pop.	±%
1861	396	—
1871	450	+13.6%
1881	461	+2.4%
1901	653	+41.6%
1911	1,032	+58.0%

Year	Pop.	±%
1921	1,242	+20.3%
1931	1,380	+11.1%
1936	1,308	−5.2%
1951	1,736	+32.7%
1961	1,601	−7.8%

Year	Pop.	±%
1971	1,558	−2.7%
1981	1,574	+1.0%
1991	1,429	−9.2%
2001	1,416	−0.9%

Source: Data from ISTAT
