= Onore =

- Comune
- Comune di Onore
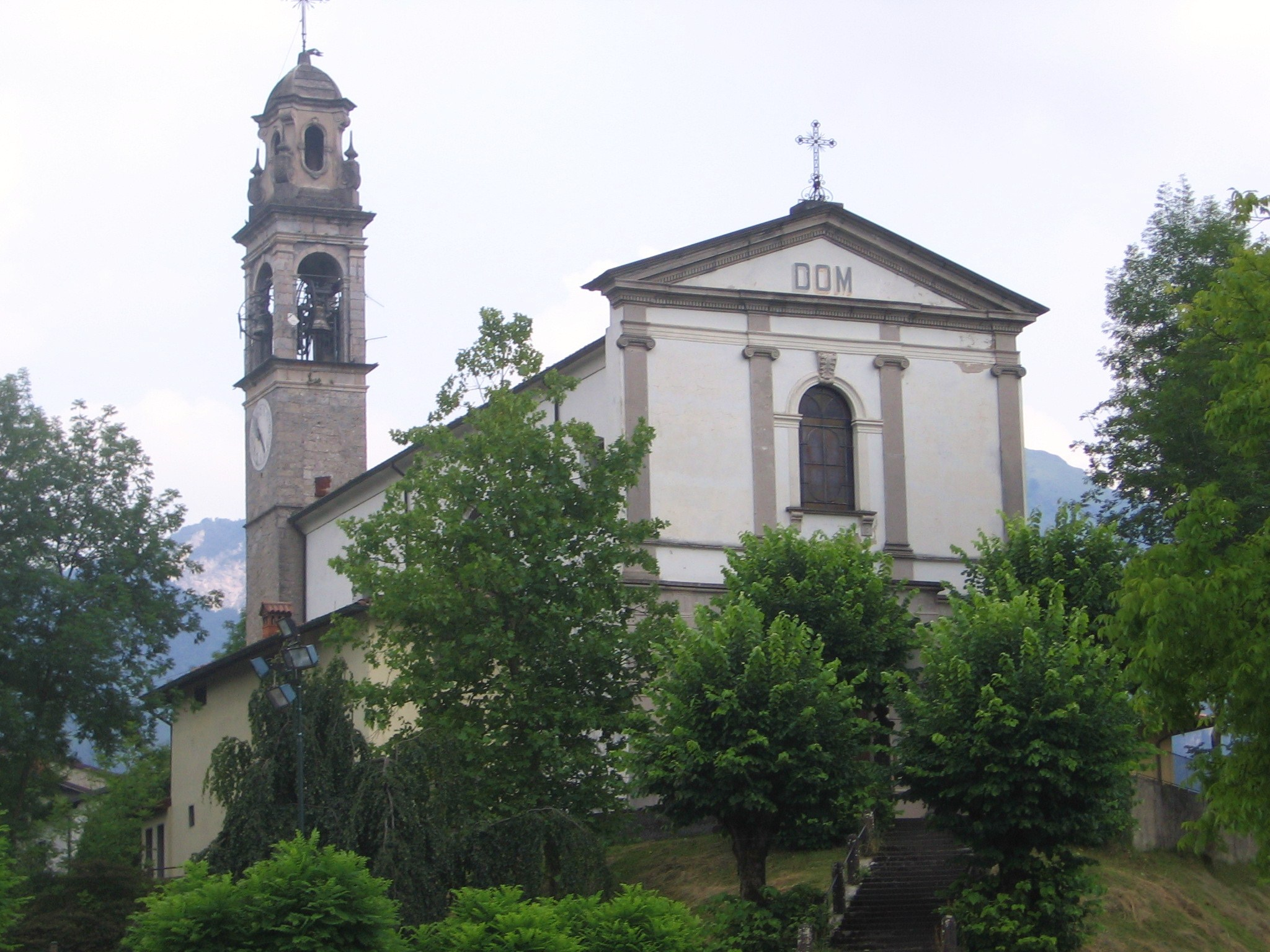
- Church

- Location within Italy Location within Lombardy
- Coordinates: 45°53′N 10°1′E
- Country: Italy
- Region: Lombardy
- Province: Province of Bergamo (BG)

Government
  - Mayor: Michele Schiavi (right-wing)

Area
  - Total: 11.6 km^{2} (4.5 sq mi)
- Elevation: 700 m (2,300 ft)

Population (Dec. 2004)
  - Total: 799
  - Density: 68.9/km^{2} (178/sq mi)
- Demonym: Onoresi
- Time zone: UTC+1 (CET)
  - Summer (DST): UTC+2 (CEST)
- Postal code: 24020
- Dialing code: 0346

Onore (Bergamasque: Lanùr) is a comune (municipality) in the Province of Bergamo in the Italian region of Lombardy, located about 80 kilometres (50 mi) northeast of Milan and about 35 kilometres (22 mi) northeast of Bergamo. As of 31 December 2004, it had a population of 799 and an area of 11.6 square kilometres (4.5 mi^{2}).

Onore borders the following municipalities: Castione della Presolana, Fino del Monte, Songavazzo.

== Demographic evolution ==
Historical population

Year	Pop.	±%
1861	401	—
1871	415	+3.5%
1881	490	+18.1%
1901	576	+17.6%
1911	645	+12.0%

Year	Pop.	±%
1921	639	−0.9%
1931	670	+4.9%
1936	677	+1.0%
1951	759	+12.1%
1961	668	−12.0%

Year	Pop.	±%
1971	673	+0.7%
1981	736	+9.4%
1991	694	−5.7%
2001	717	+3.3%

Source: Data from ISTAT
