= Cerete =

- Comune
- Comune di Cerete
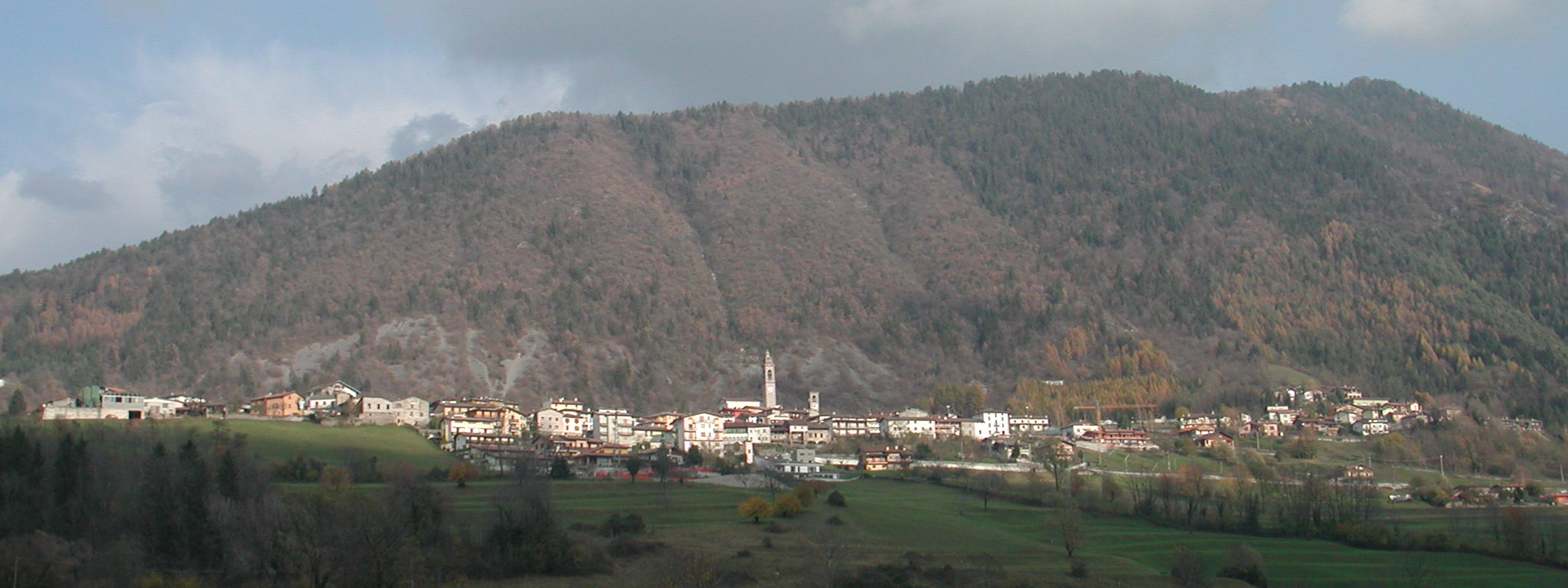
- Cerete

- Coat of arms

- Location within Italy Location within Lombardy
- Coordinates: 45°52′N 10°3′E
- Country: Italy
- Region: Lombardy
- Province: Bergamo (BG)
- Frazioni: Cerete Alto, Cerete Basso, Novezio

Government
  - Mayor: Cinzia Locatelli

Area
  - Total: 13.9 km^{2} (5.4 sq mi)
- Elevation: 612 m (2,008 ft)

Population (30 June 2017)
  - Total: 1,607
  - Density: 116/km^{2} (299/sq mi)
- Demonym: Ceretesi
- Time zone: UTC+1 (CET)
  - Summer (DST): UTC+2 (CEST)
- Postal code: 24020
- Dialing code: 0346
- Website: Official website

Cerete (Bergamasque: Serét) is a comune (municipality) in the Province of Bergamo in the Italian region of Lombardy, located about 80 kilometres (50 mi) northeast of Milan and about 35 kilometres (22 mi) northeast of Bergamo.

Cerete borders the following municipalities: Bossico, Gandino, Rovetta, Songavazzo, Sovere.

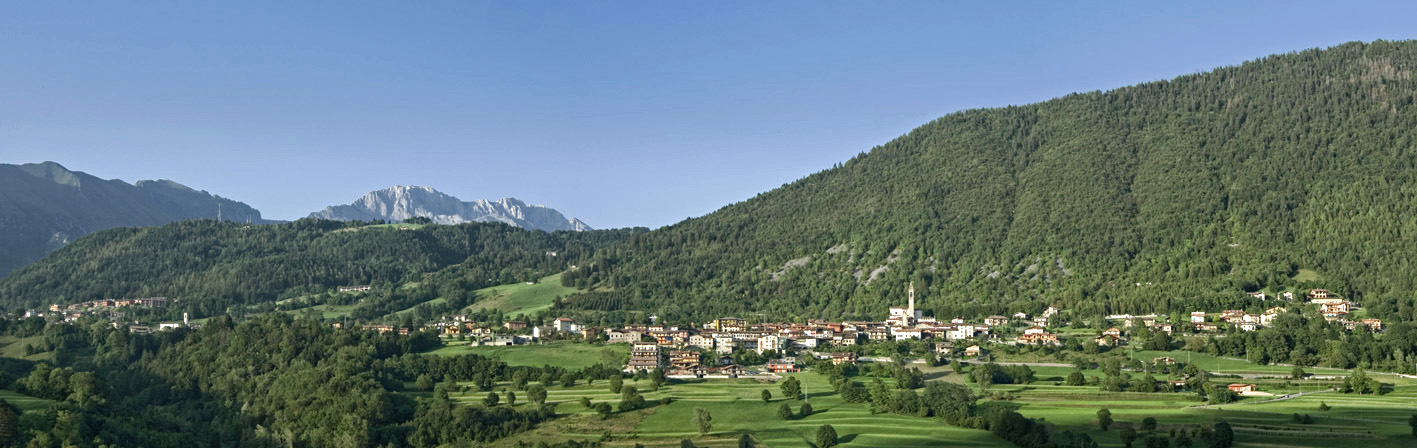
the town of Cerete
