= Artogne =

Artogne Artògne
- Comune
- Comune di Artogne
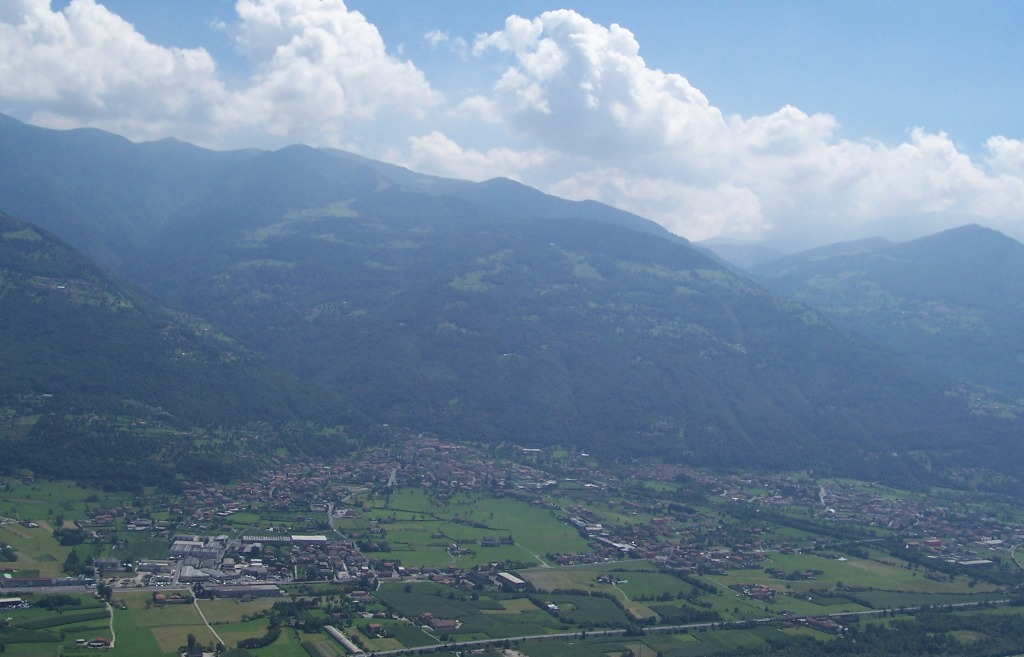
- View of Artogne

- Coat of arms

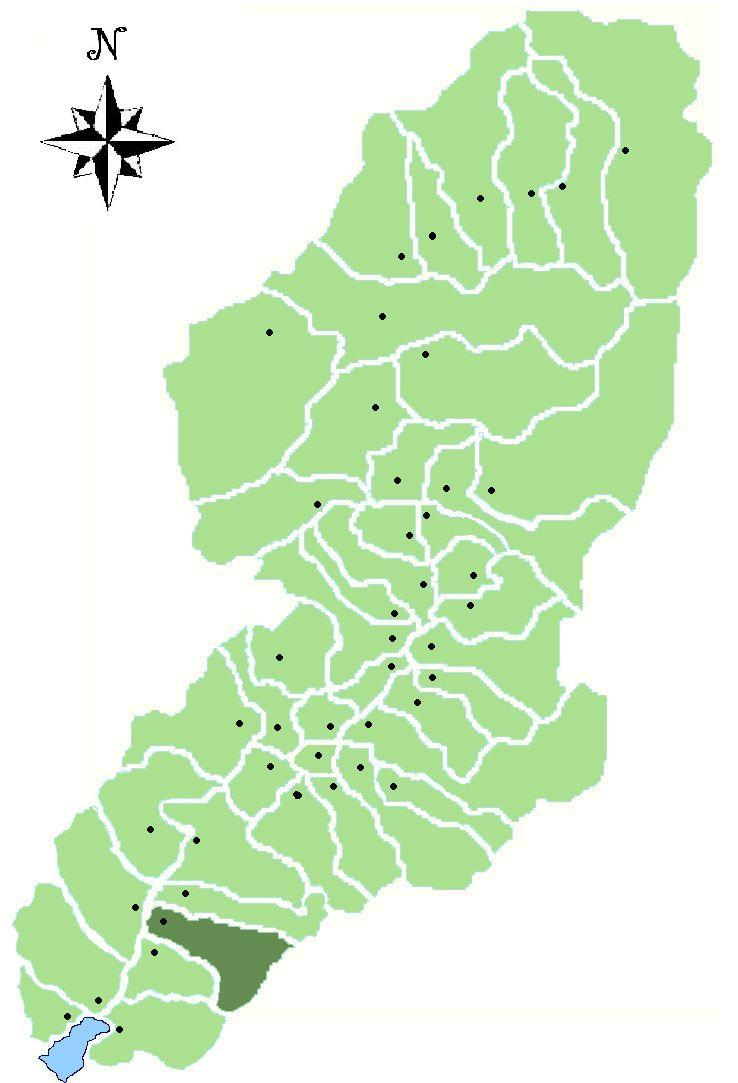

- Location of Artogne in Italy Artogne (Lombardy)
- Coordinates: 45°51′2″N 10°9′43″E
- Country: Italy
- Region: Lombardy
- Province: Brescia (BS)

Government
  - Mayor: Barbara Bonicelli

Area
  - Total: 21.02 km^{2} (8.12 sq mi)
- Elevation: 266 m (873 ft)

Population (30 November 2017)
  - Total: 3,636
  - Density: 173.0/km^{2} (448.0/sq mi)
- Demonym: Artognesi
- Time zone: UTC+1 (CET)
  - Summer (DST): UTC+2 (CEST)
- Postal code: 25040
- Dialing code: 0364
- Patron saint: Sts. Cornelius and Cyprian
- Saint day: 16 settembre
- Website: Official website

Artogne (Artògne in camunian dialect) is an Italian comune in the province of Brescia, in Lombardy (Italy).

Artogne lies on the left side of Oglio river, between the towns of Gianico, Pian Camuno and Rogno.

== History ==
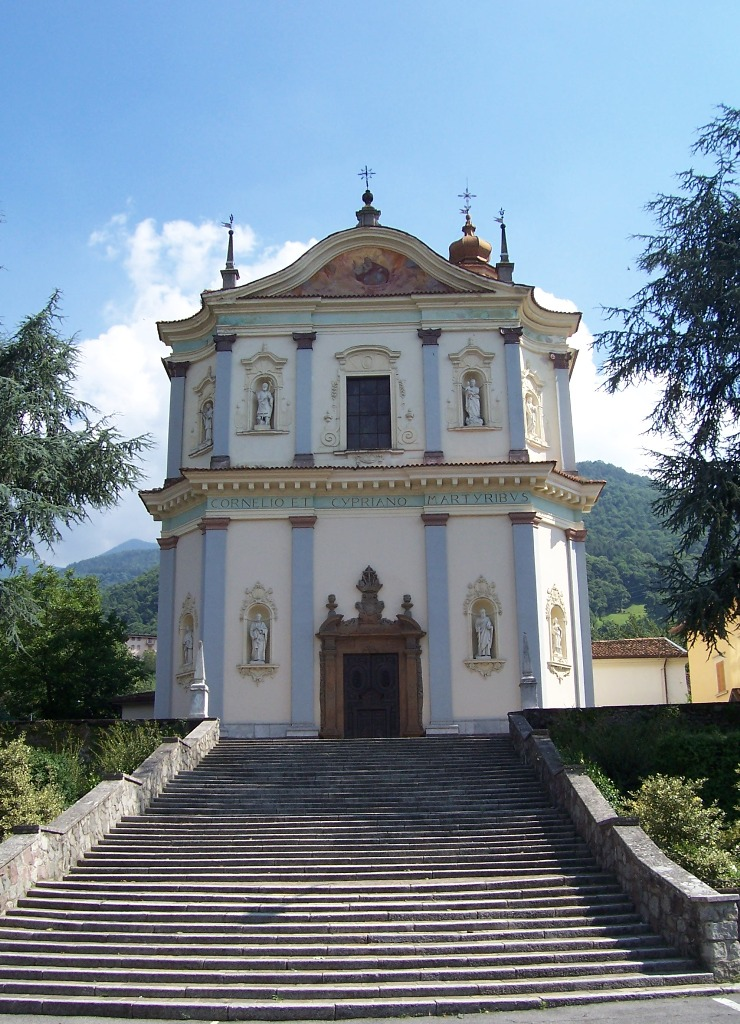
Parish church of Saints Cornelius and Cyprian

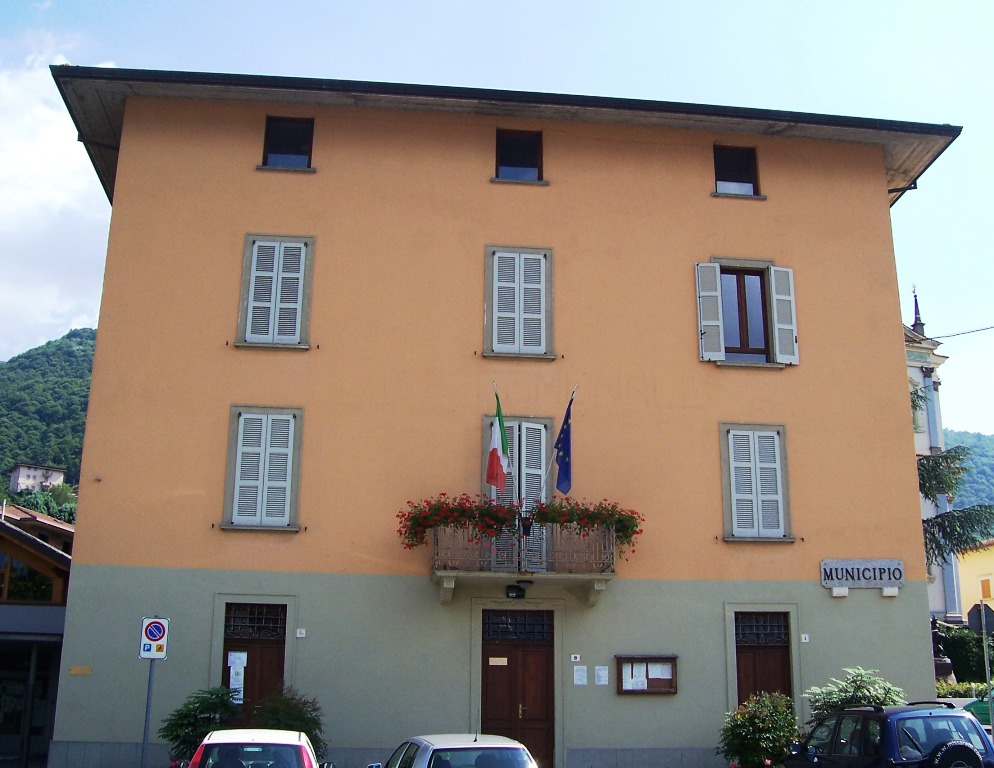
Townhall.

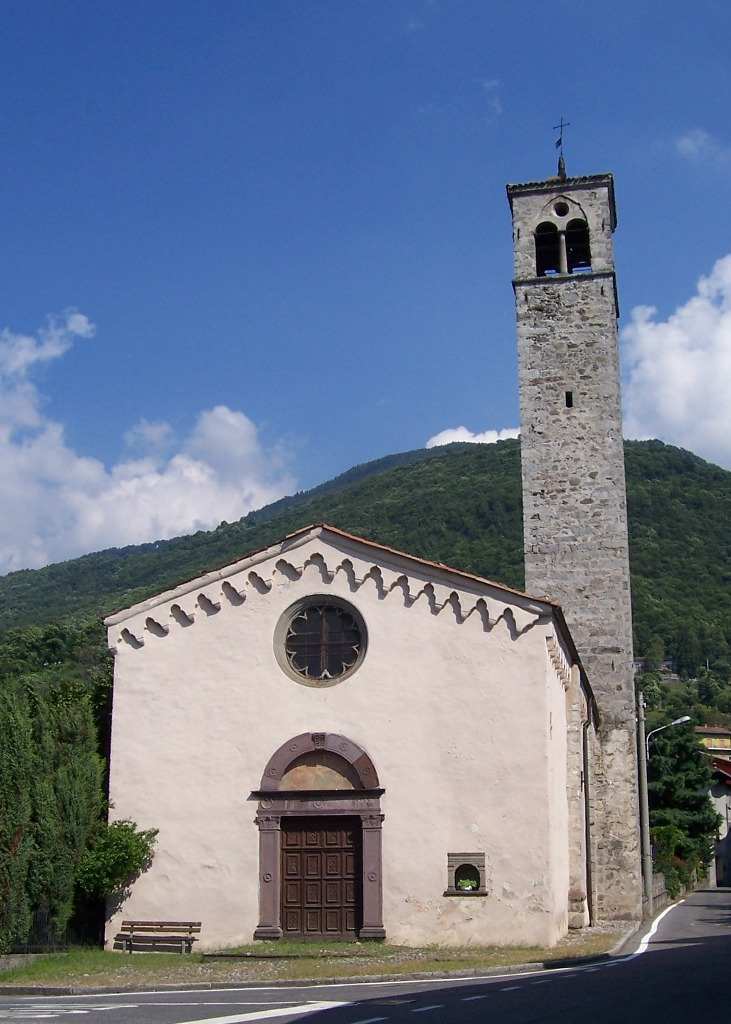
Church of Santa Maria ad Elisabetta.

In 1233 Artogne became property of the Brusati family.

In 1331 Zanone called "Mastaio" and Ziliolo Federici, sons of Bojaco of Gorzone, bought all the property that Girardo Brusati owned in the land of Artogne.

Artogne is indicated on the 1508 map of Valle Camonica designed by Leonardo da Vinci, which is kept at the Royal Library of Windsor, in Great Britain.

In 1912 a severe flood hit the village.

In 1927 the town merged with that of Pian Camuno, creating the town of Pian d'Artogne. This was split again in 1957.

On July 26, 1944, Battista Pedersoli, Giacomo Marioli and Antonio Cotti Cottiniare were killed at the Cascina Campelli by Nazi-fascists.

== Main sights ==
The churches of Artogne are:

- Church of Santa Maria a Elisabetta (15th century): the portal dates from 1532.
- Church of Sant'Andrea, in 15th century style. The presbytery is separated from the nave by an iron grating.
- Parish of Saints Cornelius and Cyprian, the portal in "stone of Sarnico" contains the inscription "pietas polùpuli erexit years 1751/cornelio et cypria martiribus".

There are several houses of the Federici family, including one with a stone portal of Sarnico and studded wooden door of the 15th century.

== Traditions and folklore ==
The scütüm are in camunian dialect nicknames, sometimes personal, elsewhere showing the characteristic features of a community. The one which characterize the people of Artogne are Patàte, Mascherpine, maia mèlga, Màgole.

== Sport ==
Sportspeople linked to Artogne include:

- Nadia Fanchini
- Elena Fanchini

== Twin towns ==
Artogne is twinned with:

- Courcelles, Belgium, since 1999

== Bibliography ==
- Panazza, Gaetano; Araldo Bertolini (1984). Arte in Val Camonica - vol 3 (in Italian). Brescia: Industrie grafiche bresciane.
