= Rovetta =

- Comune
- Comune di Rovetta
- Location within Italy Location within Lombardy
- Coordinates: 45°53′N 9°59′E
- Country: Italy
- Region: Lombardy
- Province: Province of Bergamo (BG)
- Frazioni: S. Lorenzo

Government
  - Mayor: Mauro Marinoni

Area
  - Total: 24.0 km^{2} (9.3 sq mi)
- Elevation: 650 m (2,130 ft)

Population (Dec. 2004)
  - Total: 3,611
  - Density: 150/km^{2} (390/sq mi)
- Demonym: Rovettesi
- Time zone: UTC+1 (CET)
  - Summer (DST): UTC+2 (CEST)
- Postal code: 24020
- Dialing code: 0346

Rovetta (Bergamasque: Roèta or Ruèta) is a comune (municipality) in the Province of Bergamo in the Italian region of Lombardy, located about 80 kilometres (50 mi) northeast of Milan and about 30 kilometres (19 mi) northeast of Bergamo. As of 31 December 2004, it had a population of 3,611 and an area of 24.0 square kilometres (9.3 mi^{2}).

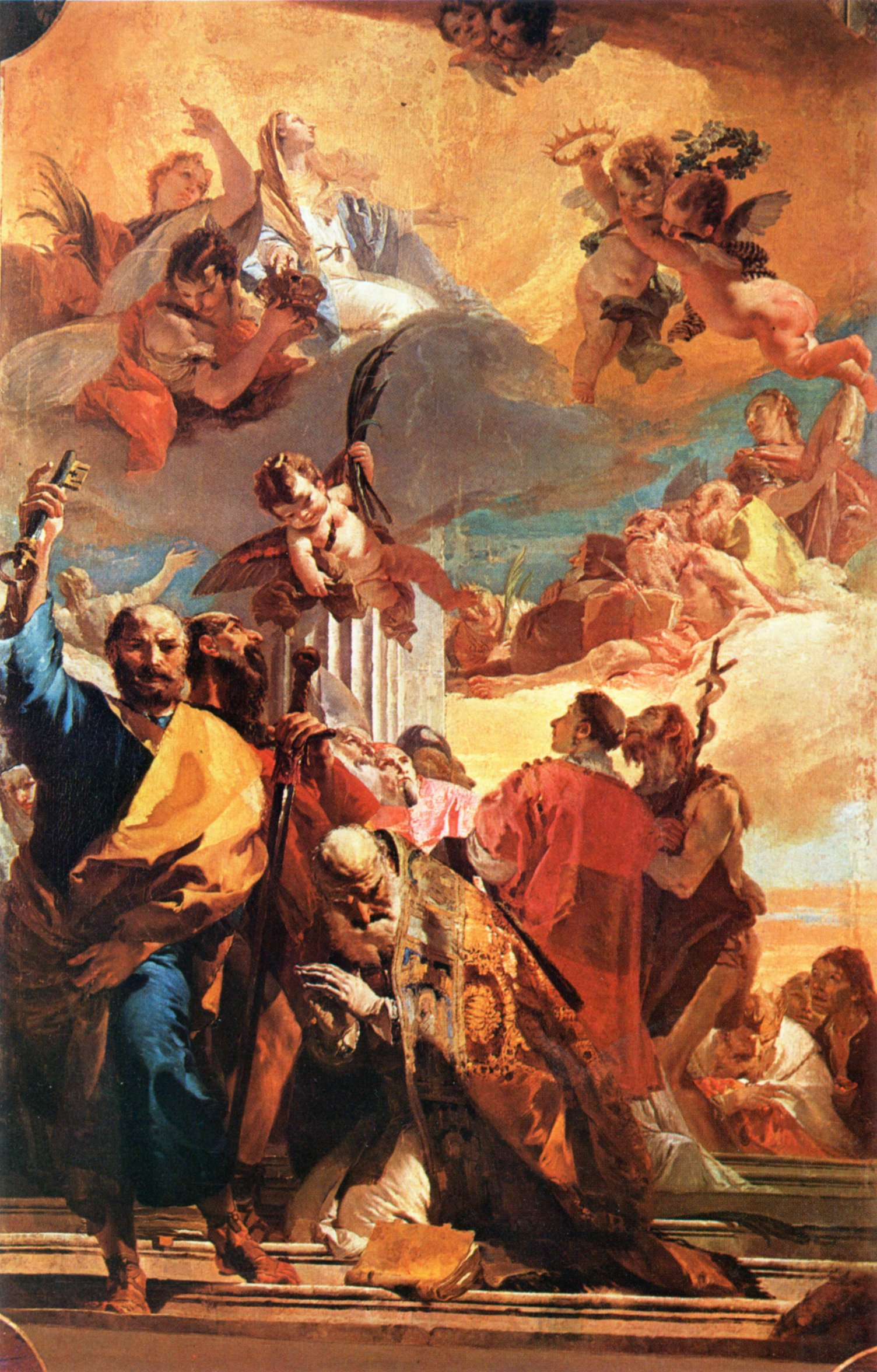
Madonna in gloria with the Saints of Giovan Battista Tiepolo

The municipality of Rovetta contains the frazione (subdivision) S. Lorenzo.

Rovetta borders the following municipalities: Castione della Presolana, Cerete, Clusone, Colere, Fino del Monte, Gandino, Oltressenda Alta, Songavazzo, Villa d'Ogna, Vilminore di Scalve.

== Demographic evolution ==
Historical population

Year	Pop.	±%
1861	1,128	—
1871	1,259	+11.6%
1881	1,331	+5.7%
1901	1,615	+21.3%
1911	1,943	+20.3%

Year	Pop.	±%
1921	2,162	+11.3%
1931	2,105	−2.6%
1936	1,811	−14.0%
1951	2,112	+16.6%
1961	2,033	−3.7%

Year	Pop.	±%
1971	2,147	+5.6%
1981	2,535	+18.1%
1991	2,806	+10.7%
2001	3,370	+20.1%

Source: Data from ISTAT

== Twin towns ==
Rovetta is twinned with:

- Vilafant, Spain

== See also ==
- Rovetta massacre
