= Lake Moro (Valle Brembana) =

Lake in Lombardy, Italy

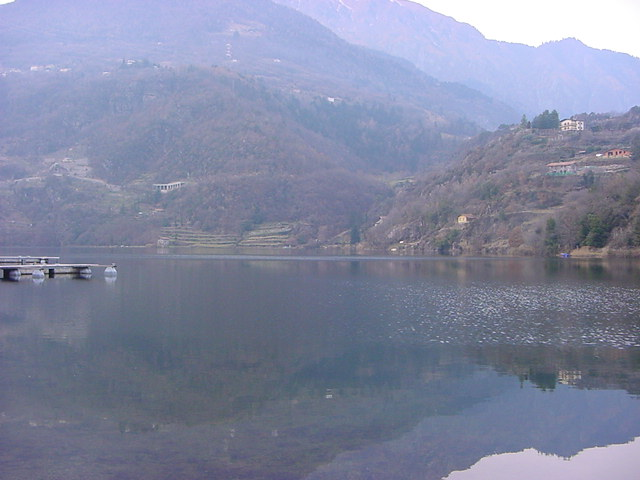

- Location within Lombardy
- Location: Province of Bergamo, Lombardy
- Coordinates: 46.052193°N 9.794955°E
- Basin countries: Italy
- Surface elevation: 2,235 m (7,333 ft)

Lake Moro is a lake in the Province of Bergamo, Lombardy, Italy.

It can be reached from Foppolo Alta by starting from the ski lifts and continuing towards Montebello. Once you reach the refuge, continue along the trail that heads northeast towards Lago Moro-Corno Stella. Alternatively, it can be reached from Valtellina by climbing the Valcervia to the Valcervia Pass, located north of the lake.
