= Costa Volpino =

- Comune
- Comune di Costa Volpino
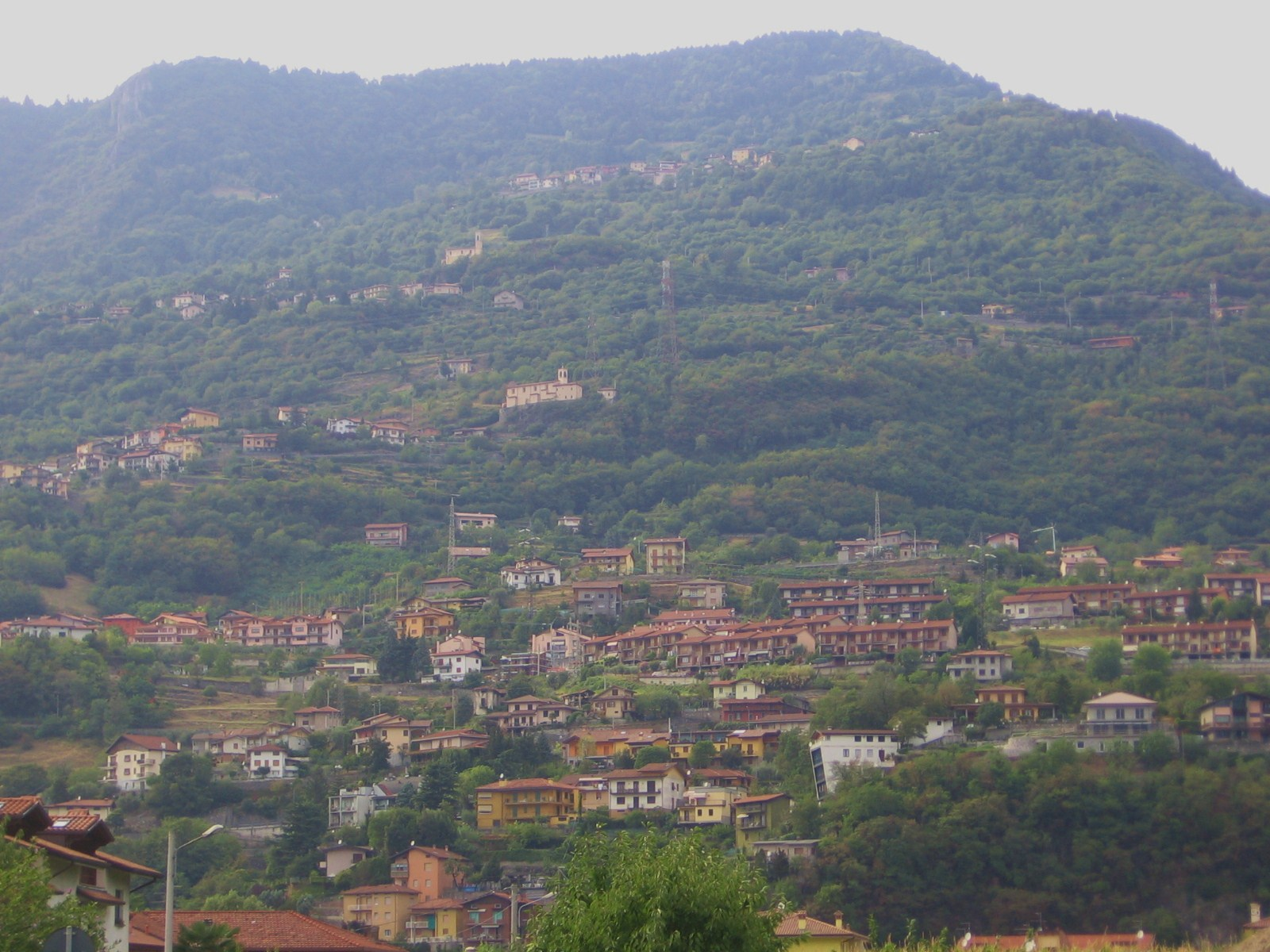
- Costa Volpino

- Coat of arms

- Location within Italy Location within Lombardy
- Coordinates: 45°49′50″N 10°05′57″E
- Country: Italy
- Region: Lombardy
- Province: Bergamo (BG)
- Frazioni: Branìco, Ceratéllo, Corti, Flaccanìco, Qualìno, Piano, Volpino

Government
  - Mayor: Mauro Bonomelli

Area
  - Total: 18 km^{2} (6.9 sq mi)
- Elevation: 192 m (630 ft)

Population (31 December 2021)
  - Total: 8,997
  - Density: 500/km^{2} (1,300/sq mi)
- Demonym: Costavolpinesi
- Time zone: UTC+1 (CET)
  - Summer (DST): UTC+2 (CEST)
- Postal code: 24062
- Dialing code: 035
- Website: Official website

Costa Volpino (Bergamasque: Cósta Ulpì) is a comune in the province of Bergamo, in Lombardy, Italy. Situated at the end of Valle Camonica, where the Oglio river enters the Lake Iseo, it is bounded by other communes of Lovere and Rogno.
