= Gianico =

Gianico Jànec
- Comune
- Comune di Gianico
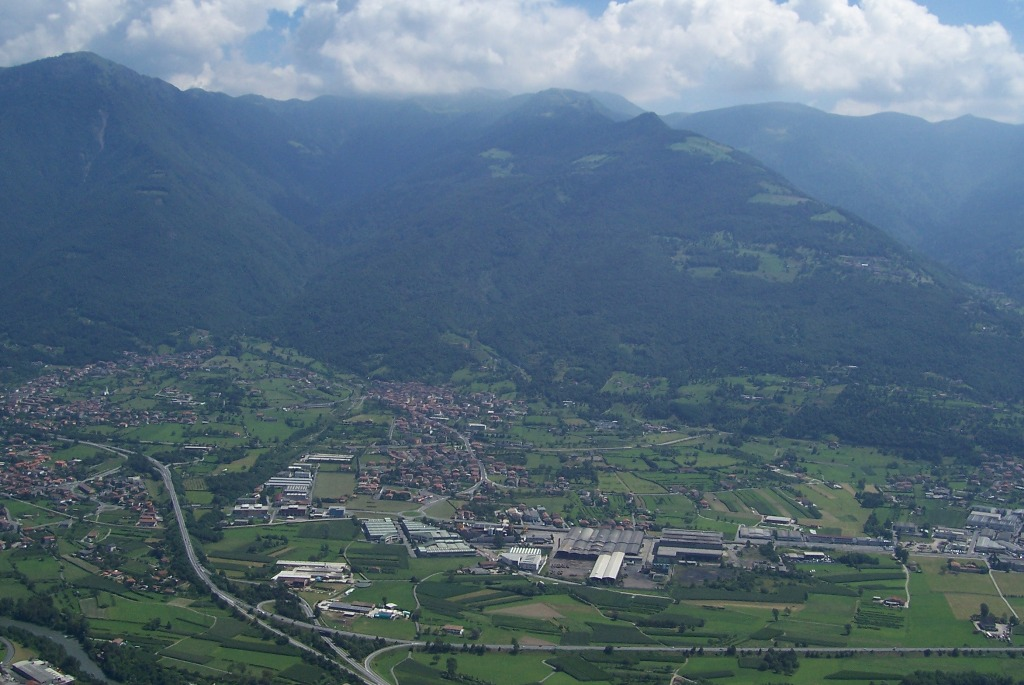
- Gianico

- Location within Italy Location within Lombardy
- Coordinates: 45°51′59″N 10°10′33″E
- Country: Italy
- Region: Lombardy
- Province: Brescia (BS)

Area
  - Total: 13 km^{2} (5.0 sq mi)
- Elevation: 281 m (922 ft)

Population (2011)
  - Total: 2,227
  - Density: 170/km^{2} (440/sq mi)
- Time zone: UTC+1 (CET)
  - Summer (DST): UTC+2 (CEST)
- Postal code: 25040
- Dialing code: 0364
- Website: Official website

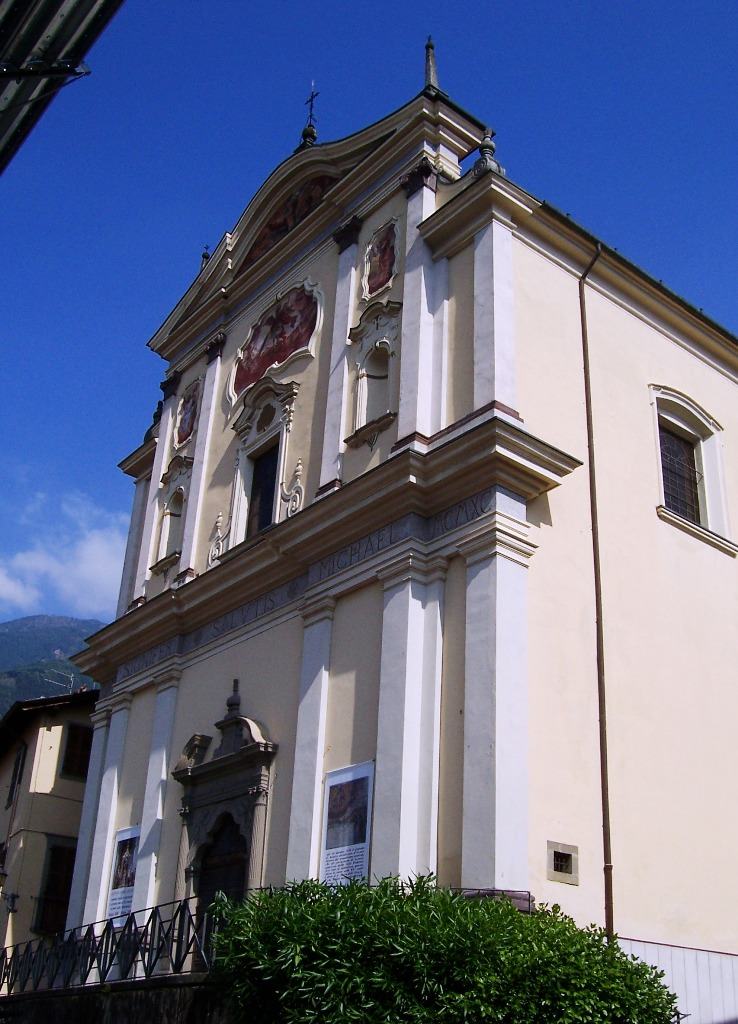
San Michele church

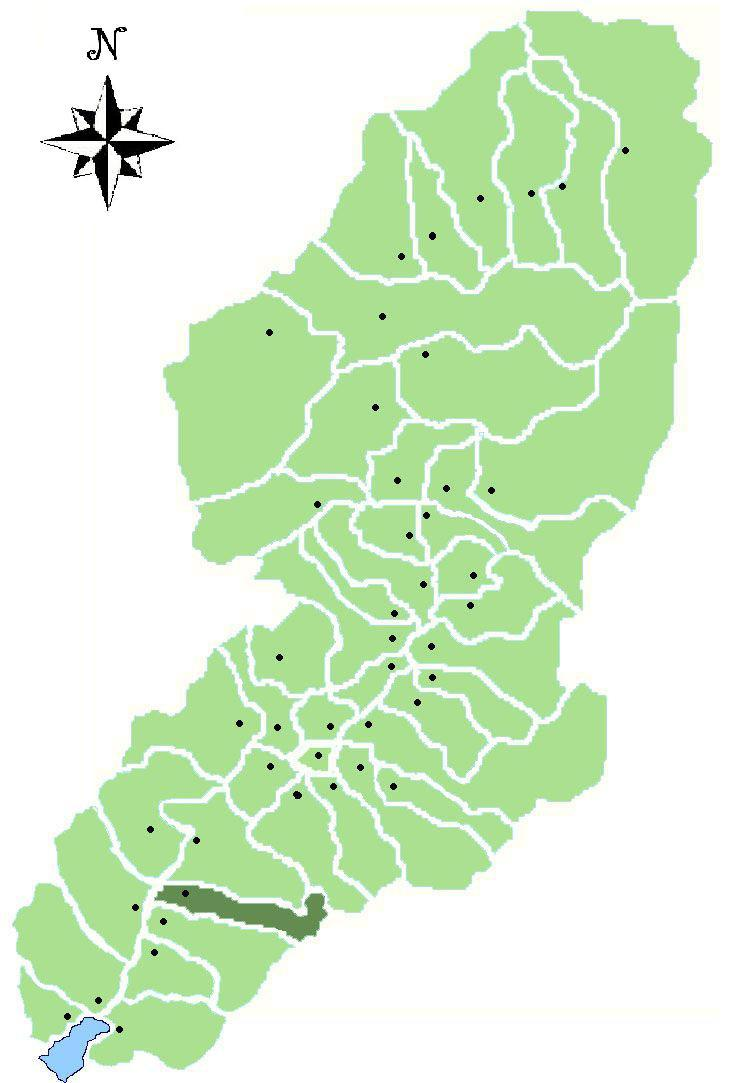
Location of Gianico in Val Camonica

Gianico (Camunian: Jànec) is a town and comune in the province of Brescia, in Lombardy.
