= Lake Moro (Valle Camonica) =

Lake in Province of Brescia, Italy

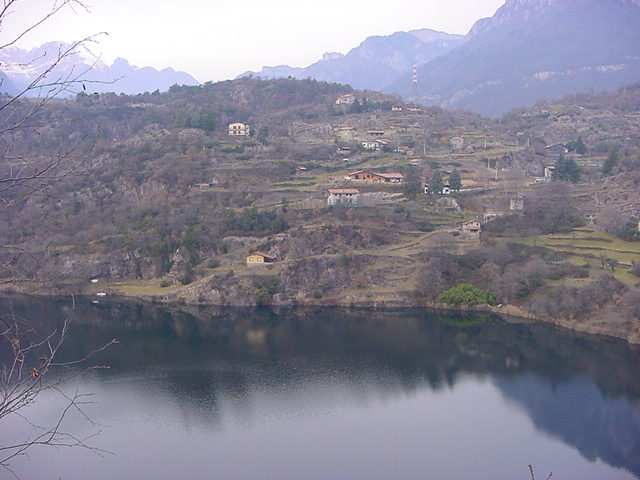

- Location within Lombardy
- Location: Province of Brescia, Lombardy
- Coordinates: 45°52′48.61″N 10°9′23.47″E
- Primary inflows: none
- Primary outflows: none
- Basin countries: Italy
- Surface area: 0.174 km^{2} (0.067 sq mi)
- Surface elevation: 380 m (1,250 ft)

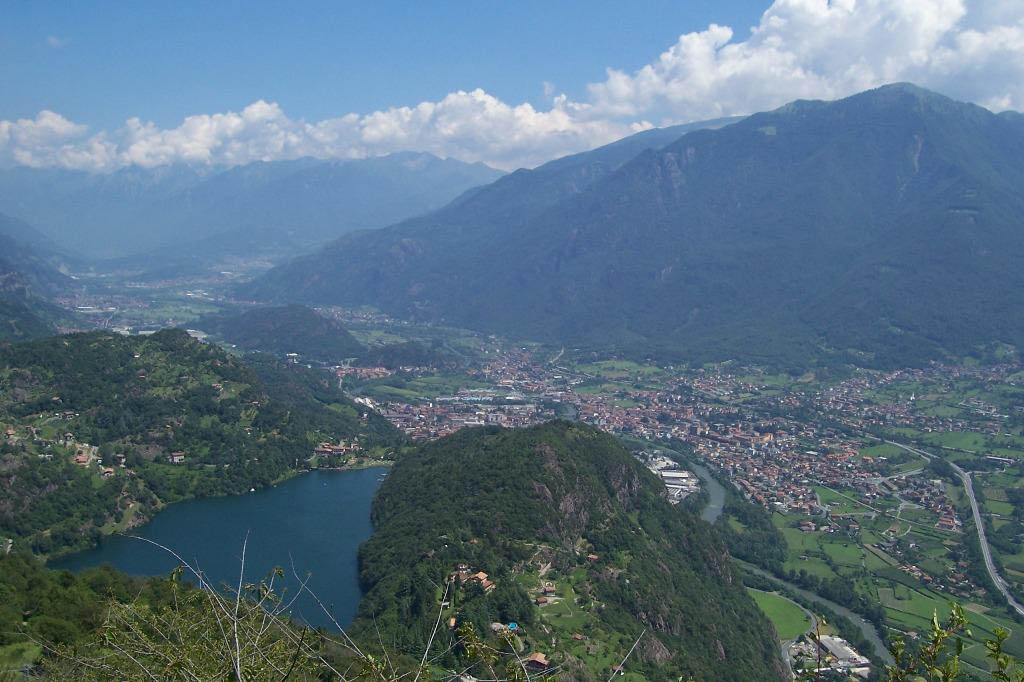
Aerial view of Lake Moro

Lake Moro (Italian: Lago Moro) is a lake in the Province of Brescia, Lombardy, Italy. At an elevation of 380 m, its surface area is 0.174 km^{2}.
