= Angolo Terme =

Angolo Terme Angól
- Comune
- Comune di Angolo Terme
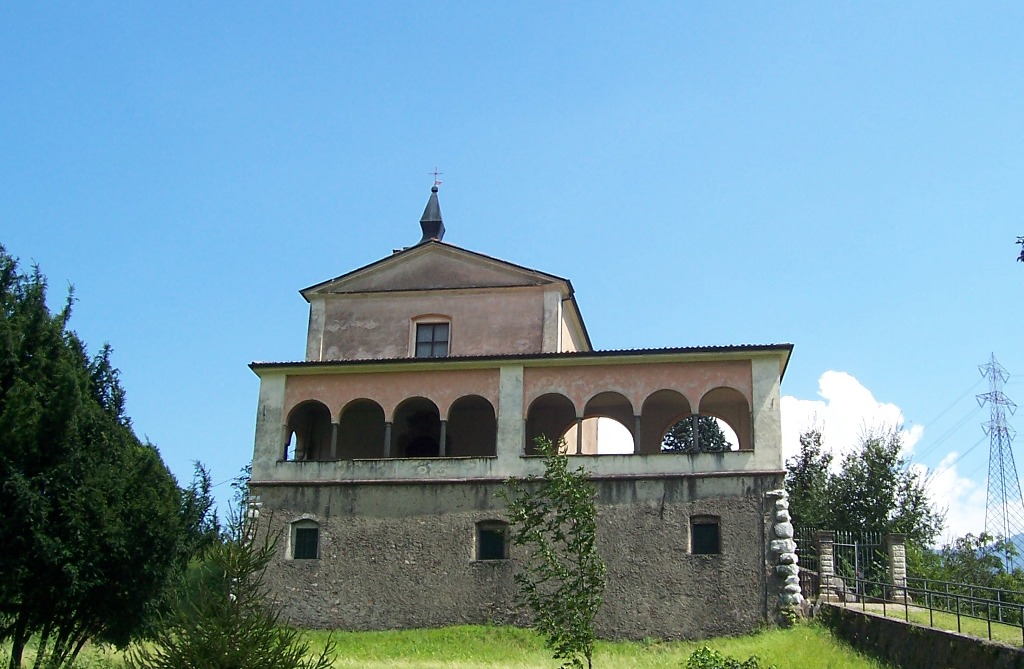
- Church of San Silvestro, Angolo Terme

- Coat of arms

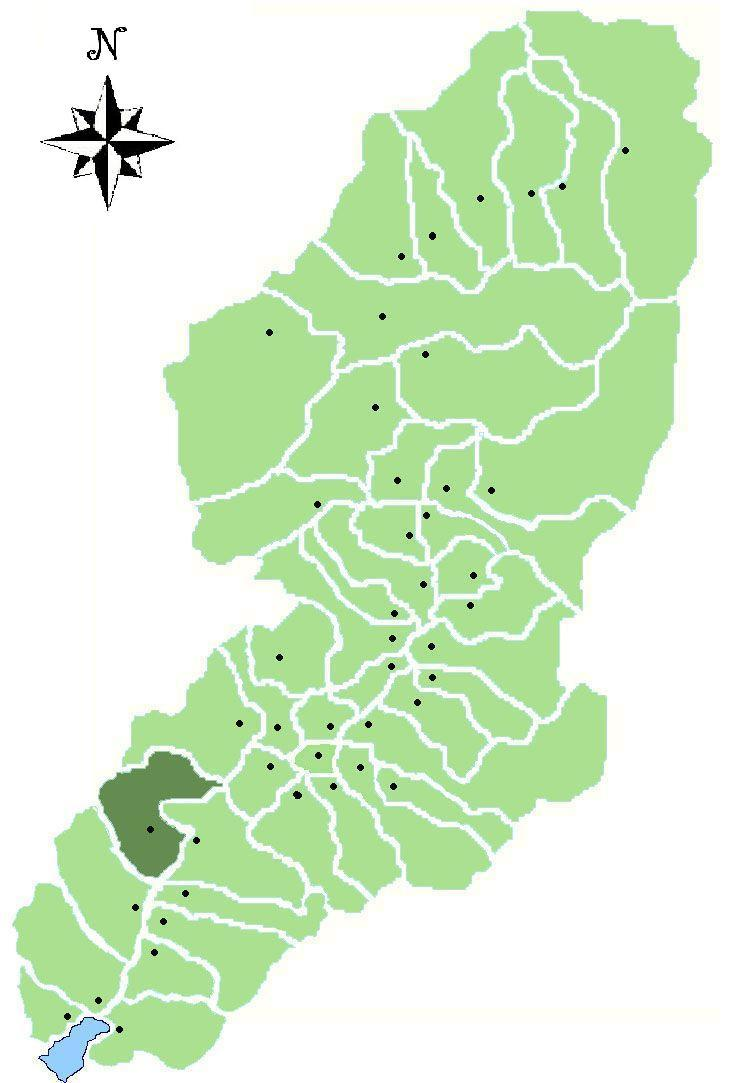

- Location of Angolo Terme in Italy Angolo Terme (Lombardy)
- Coordinates: 45°53′32″N 10°8′55″E
- Country: Italy
- Region: Lombardy
- Province: Brescia (BS)
- Frazioni: Anfurro, Mazzunno, Terzano

Government
  - Mayor: Alessandro Morandini

Area
  - Total: 30.56 km^{2} (11.80 sq mi)
- Elevation: 426 m (1,398 ft)

Population (30 April 2017)
  - Total: 2,397
  - Density: 78.44/km^{2} (203.1/sq mi)
- Demonym: Angolesi
- Time zone: UTC+1 (CET)
  - Summer (DST): UTC+2 (CEST)
- Postal code: 25040
- Dialing code: 0364
- Website: Official website

Angolo Terme (Angól in Camunian dialect) is a comune in Val Camonica, province of Brescia, in Lombardy, Italy. It lies on the right bank of the river Dezzo, in the lower Valle di Scalve.

== History ==
Angolo was a mining center known since the 4th century BC. After the 12th century AD its history was closely linked to that of the Federici family. In 1335 Luchino Visconti granted them a privilege to extract iron in the area. In 1403 Caterina Visconti gave the family the possessions of the Antonioli of Grevo in exchange for the support offered her.

In 1408 Angolo went to Pandolfo III Malatesta, who ceded it to Comicino Federici, who temporarily sided for the Guelphs, until 1419, when he returned to the Ghibelline allegiance and the Visconti.

In 1509 Angolo (called Anghol) appears in a map of the Valle Camonica designed by Leonardo da Vinci.

In 1846 the town of Angolo, placed administratively in the province of Bergamo, demanded to be included in the province of Brescia.

In 1923 several houses suffer damage from the failure of the Gleno Dam (Italy), with 46 deaths among the inhabitants.

== Main sights ==
- Parish Church of San Lorenzo, of ancient origin, rebuilt in 1694 and enlarged in 1757. The side portals are in "Simona stone". The fifteen panels of the entrance door depict episodes of Christ's Life.
- Church of Saint Elizabeth (or of the Visitation), situated along the road that leads into the Val di Scalve. It was built between the 15th and 16th century.
- Hermitage of Saint Sylvester: built in the early 16th century.
- Former Albrici - Federici palace, with a 16th-century portal in "Sarnico stone".

== Culture ==
The scütüm are in camunian dialect nicknames, sometimes personal, elsewhere showing the characteristic features of a community. The one which characterize the people of Angolo Terme is Treàangoi.

== Sources ==
- Panazza, Gaetano; Araldo Bertolini (1984). Arte in Val Camonica - vol 2 (in Italian). Brescia: Industrie grafiche bresciane.
