= Cherio =

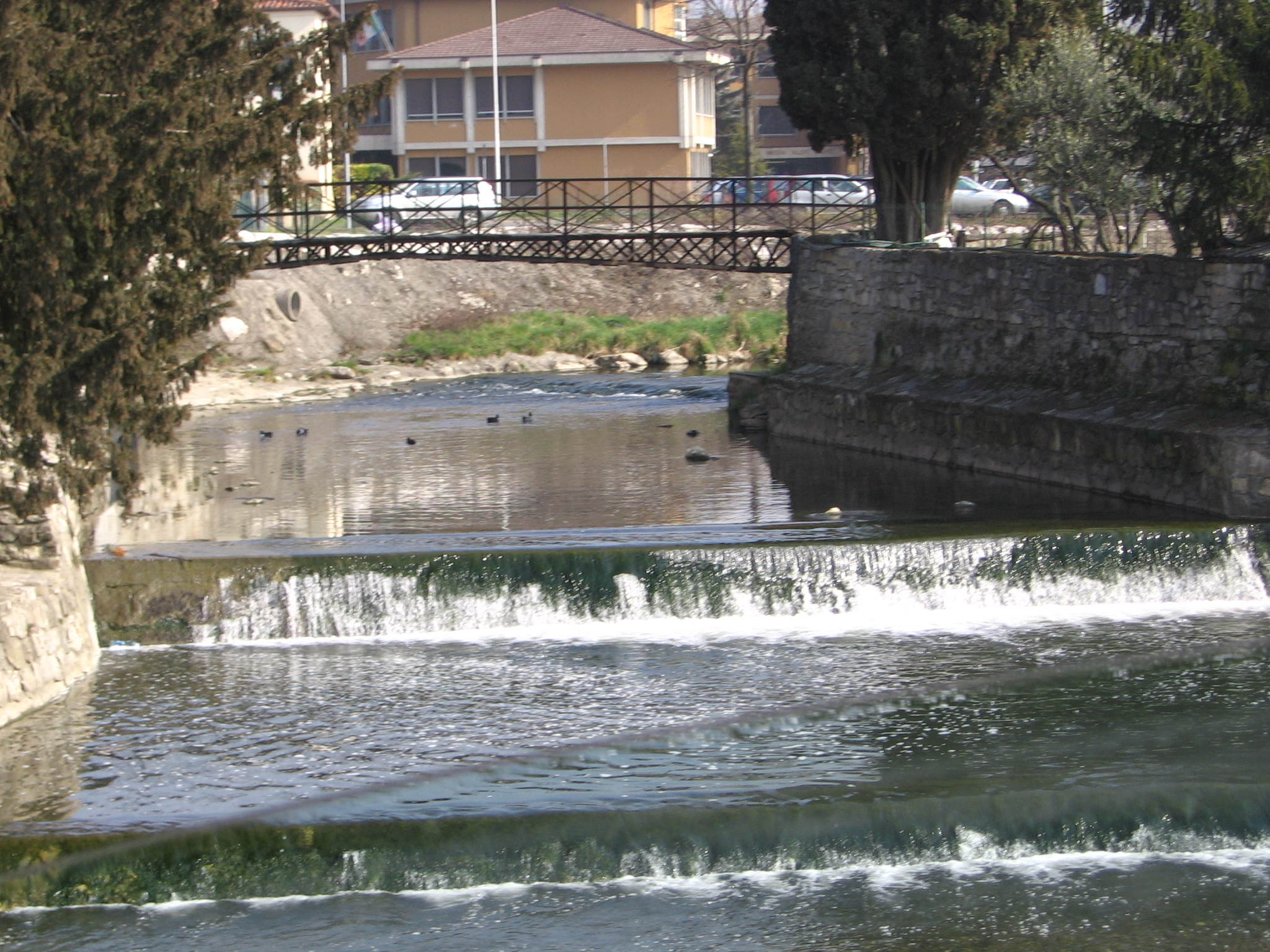

Location
- Country: Italy

Physical characteristics
- Mouth
  - location: Oglio
  - coordinates: 45.5791°N 9.8419°E

Basin features
- Progression: Oglio

The Cherio (Lombard: Chere) is a river of the Province of Bergamo in Lombardy in Italy. The river runs for 32 kilometers (20 mi) and has a basin area of 161 square kilometers (62 sq mi). Its source is at 1,276 meters (4,186 ft) above sea level at Monte Torrezzo near Lake Endine. From there, it flows into the Oglio at Palosco. The main tributary is the Tadone River on its right bank.

The valley of the river is known as the Val Cavallina (lit. "Valley of the Little Horse"; Lombard: Al Caàlina). The river flows past the communes of Endine Gaiano, Monasterolo del Castello, Casazza, Vigano San Martino, Grone, Borgo di Terzo, Berzo San Fermo, Luzzana, Entratico, Trescore Balneario, Zandobbio, Gorlago, Carobbio degli Angeli, Bolgare, Calcinate, Mornico al Serio and Palosco.
