= Francesco Zucco =

Italian painter

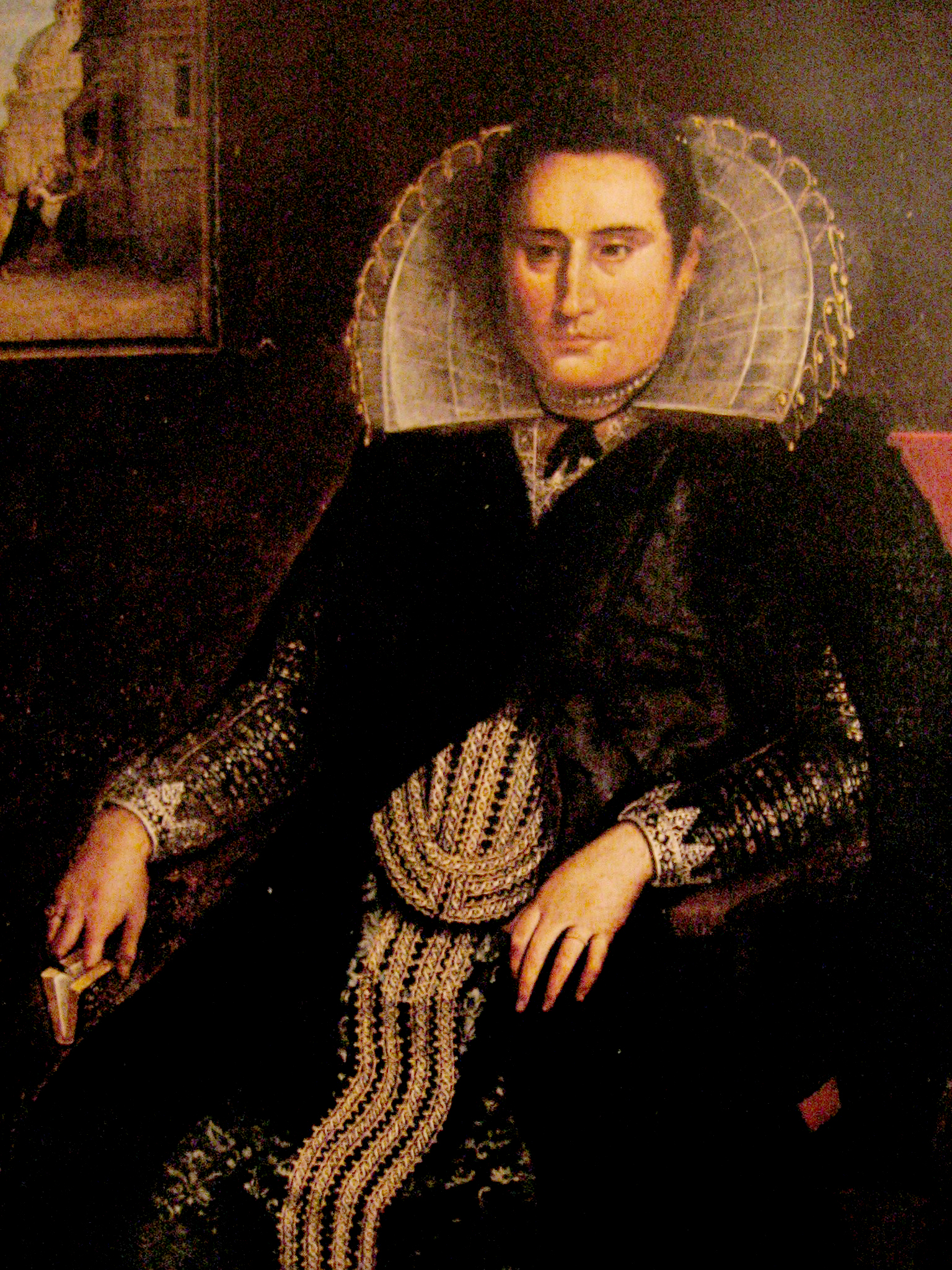
Portrait of a Lady, in the Accademia Carrara in Bergamo

Francesco Zucco (Italian pronunciation: [franˈtʃesko dˈdzukko; tˈtsukko], c.1570 – May 3, 1627) was an Italian painter.

Zucco was born in Bergamo. The year of his birth is uncertain, but is known to be no later than 1575. Zucco studied art for a time in Cremona before returning to Bergamo; there he associated with painters such as Giovanni Paolo Cavagna and Enea Salmeggia. He painted both religious and secular pieces in a fairly traditional Baroque style; the Adoration of the Magi and Virgin and Child in the parish church of Levate are reminiscent of the work of Giovanni Battista Moroni. He was active for the duration of his career all around the Province of Bergamo, and painted works for churches in Albino, Alzano Lombardo, Brembate, Camerata Cornello, Capriate San Gervasio, Entratico, Foresto Sparso, Orio al Serio (a Virgin and Child), Scanzorosciate, Villa di Serio, Ubiale Clanezzo, Peia, Suisio, Luzzana, Selvino, Sorisole, and Zandobbio. Some of his religious works may still be seen in the church of Santa Maria Maggiore in Bergamo, while other paintings are in that city's Accademia Carrara.

Zucco married one Aurelia Chiesa, and had three children; he died at home in Bergamo in 1627.
