= Albino, Lombardy =

Albino
- Comune
- Città di Albino
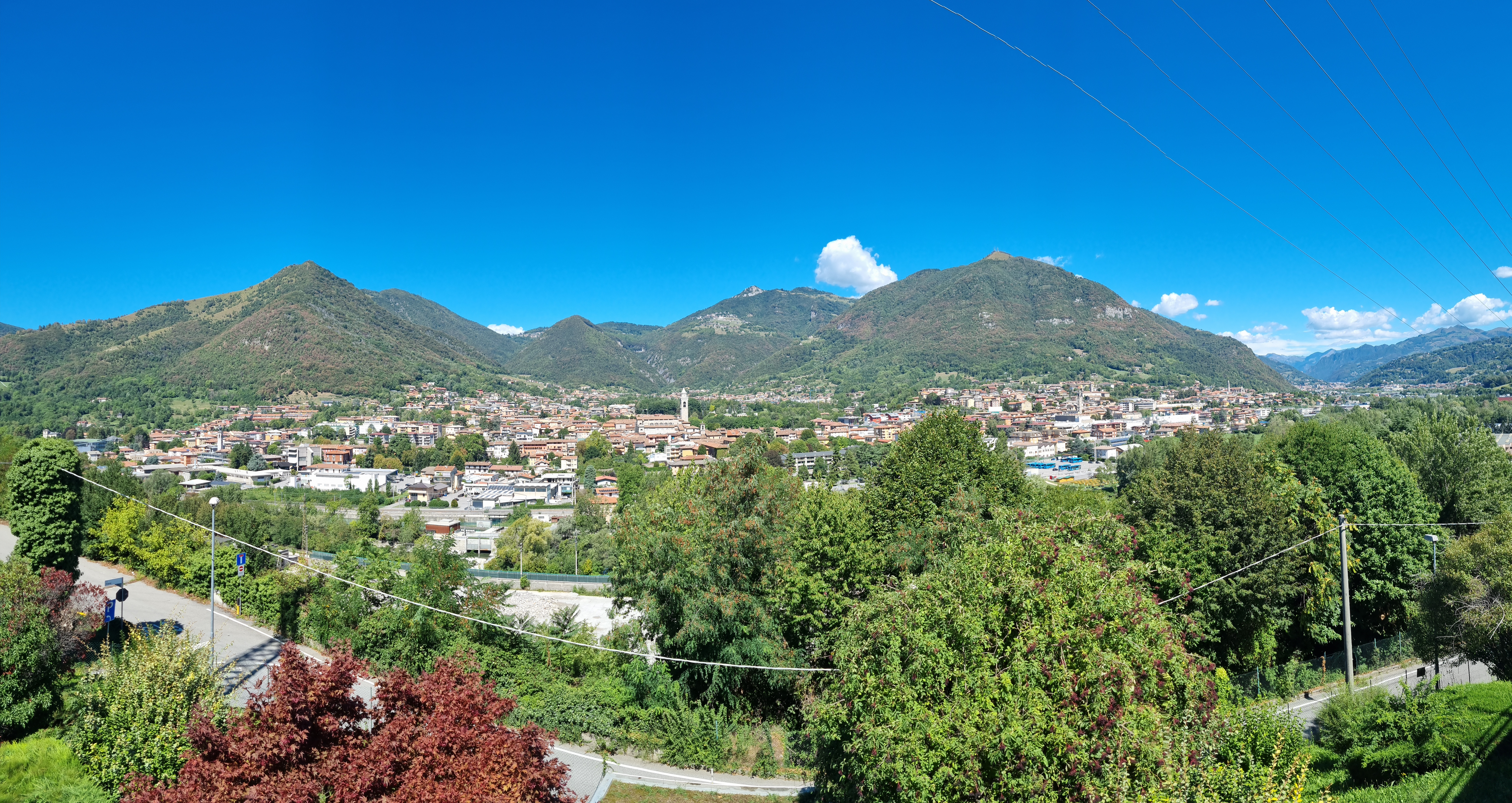
- A view over the town of Albino

- Coat of arms

- Location within Italy Location within Lombardy
- Coordinates: 45°45′38″N 9°47′49″E
- Country: Italy
- Region: Lombardy
- Province: Bergamo (BG)
- Frazioni: Bondo Petello, Desenzano al Serio, Comenduno, Vall'Alta, Fiobbio, Abbazia, Dossello, Casale, Grumelduro

Government
  - Mayor: Fabio Terzi

Area
  - Total: 31.81 km^{2} (12.28 sq mi)
- Highest elevation: 410 m (1,350 ft)
- Lowest elevation: 342 m (1,122 ft)

Population (28 February 2026)
  - Total: 17,594
  - Density: 553.1/km^{2} (1,433/sq mi)
- Demonym: Albinesi
- Time zone: UTC+1 (CET)
  - Summer (DST): UTC+2 (CEST)
- Postal code: 24021
- Dialing code: 035
- ISTAT code: 016004
- Patron saint: Sts. Julian and Albinus
- Saint day: 9 January
- Website: Official website

Albino (Bergamasque: Albì) is a comune in the province of Bergamo, in Lombardy, northern Italy. It is located northeast of Bergamo and is situated in the valley of the river Serio (Val Seriana). The comune is included in the perimeter of the Alpine Convention international treaty.

== History ==
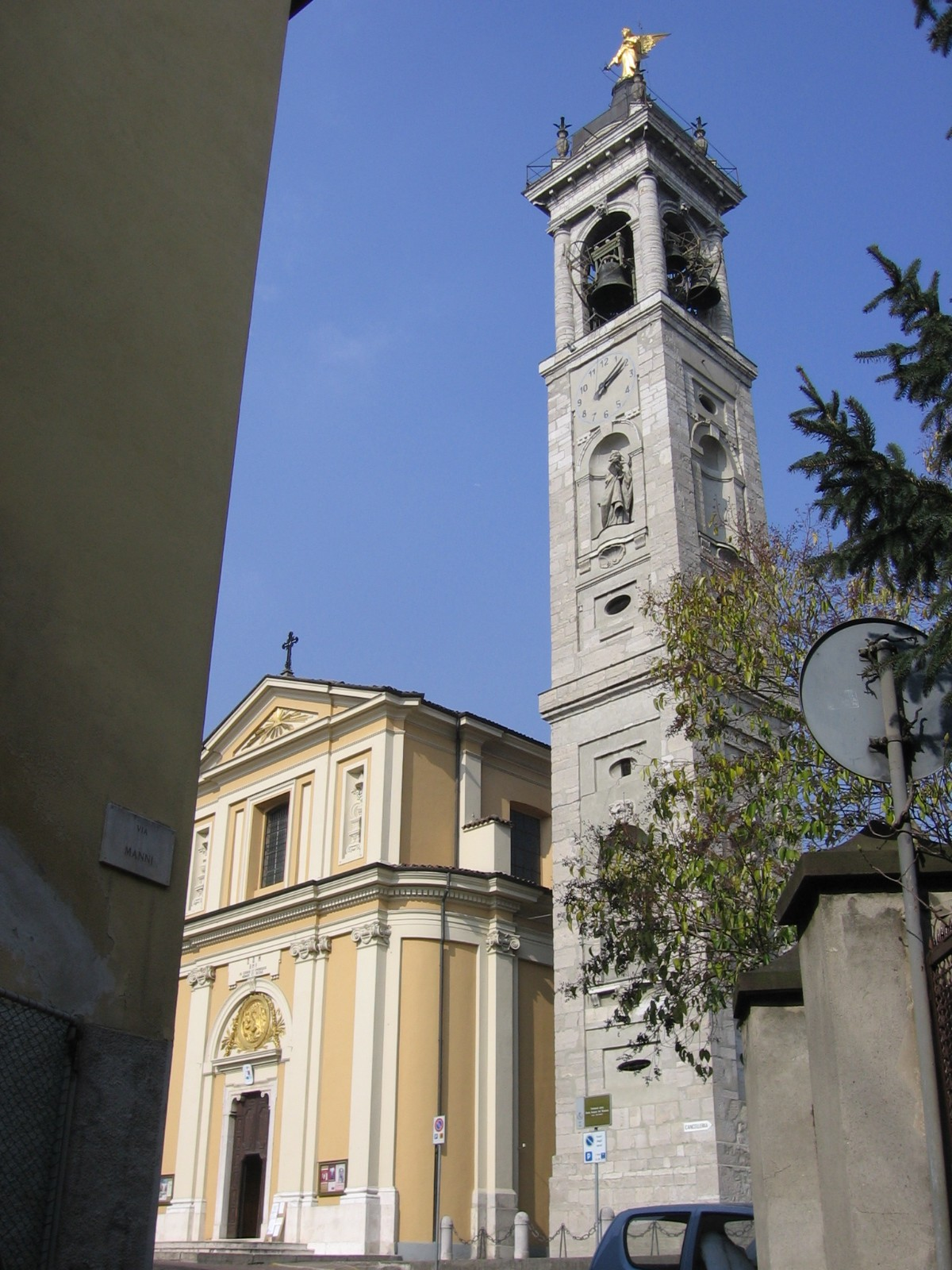
Sanctuary of Madonna della Gamba.

Archaeological findings have shown that the area was already settled in the Copper Age. In Roman times there were settlements in the area (probably of Gaulish origin), though the first document mentioning a in vico Albines dates from 892 AD. Later, entangled in the struggles between Guelphs and Ghibellines, the town was strongly fortified, a castle being built in the 14th century. Later it was under the Republic of Venice, with a strong increasing of textile and iron industry, peculiarities which still characterize Albino today.

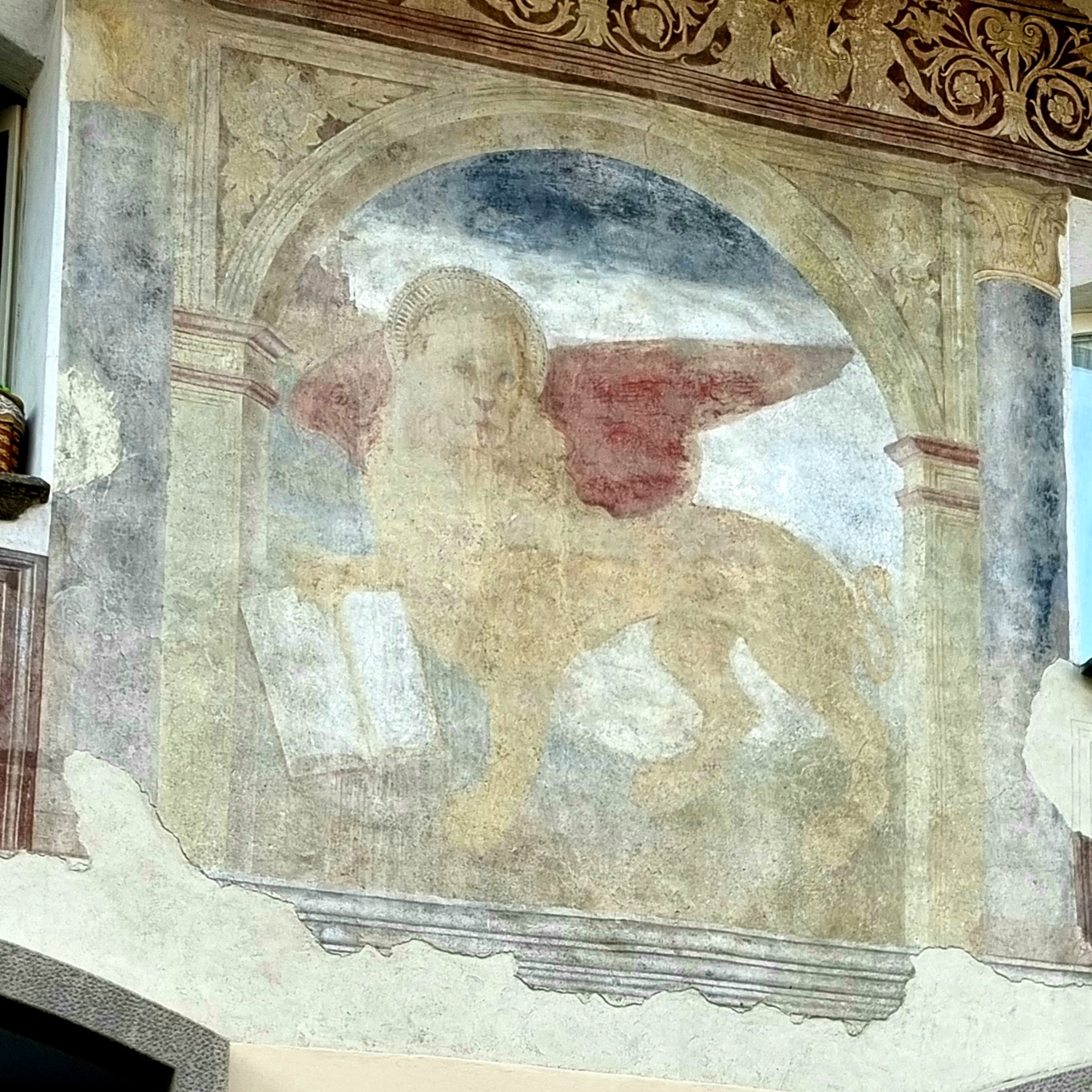
Venetian Lion of Saint Mark in a 1499 fresco on the façade of a palace in Albino, Bergamo

Albino received the honorary title of city with a presidential decree of December 27, 1991. Since 2009, the Bergamo–Albino light rail connects the two cities.

== Main sights ==
- Parrocchiale di San Giuliano, founded in 898. Rebuilt in neoclassicist style in the early 19th century, it houses works by Giovan Battista Moroni, Enea Salmeggia and others. The bell tower (1497) was designed by Cosimo Fanzago.
- Convent of San Bartolomeo (12th century), in Lombard-Gothic style. It includes frescoes from the 16th-century renovation, 21 wooden sculptures in the choir and polyptych in gilded wood. It is a national monument.
- Sanctuary of the Madonna del Pianto (15th century). It is home to a canvas by Moroni with Christ Carrying the Cross and one by Salmaggia, The Deposition.
- Church of the Conception (late 15th century). It has a notable portico and a frescoes from the 14th and 16th centuries.
- Sanctuary of the Madonna of the Snow, on the country road leading to Selvino. It dates from the 16th century, and has frescoes from the same age which were recently restored.
- Church of Sant'Anna (16th century), designed by Giovan Battista Caniana.
- Sanctuary of Altino (16th century), in the frazione Vall'Alta.
- Cistercian Abbey
- Sanctuary of Madonna della Gamba ("Madonna of the Leg"), in the frazione Desenzano al Serio. Erected from 1448, it honours a miracle that took place in 1440, when a maiden, praying the Virgin, was miraculously saved from the injuries received to her leg. It houses works by Enea Salmeggia, Palma il Giovane, Andrea Fantoni and others.
- Parish of St. Peter, a notable example of Lombard-Gothic architecture, in the frazione Desenzano al Serio.
- Casa della Misericordia, with frescoes by Moroni (1570).
- Casa Solari (16th century).

== Bounding communes ==
- Gazzaniga
- Cene
- Gaverina Terme
- Casazza
- Vigano San Martino
- Borgo di Terzo
- Luzzana
- Trescore Balneario
- Cenate Sopra
- Pradalunga
- Selvino

== See also ==
- Bergamo–Albino light rail
