= Parre (disambiguation) =

Parre is a municipality in Italy.

Parre may also refer to

- Parré, an American chocolate company
- Catherine Parr (or Parre; 1512–1548), queen consort of England and Ireland
- Ted van der Parre (born 1955), Dutch strongman
