= Bergamo–Albino light rail =

Light rail line in Italy

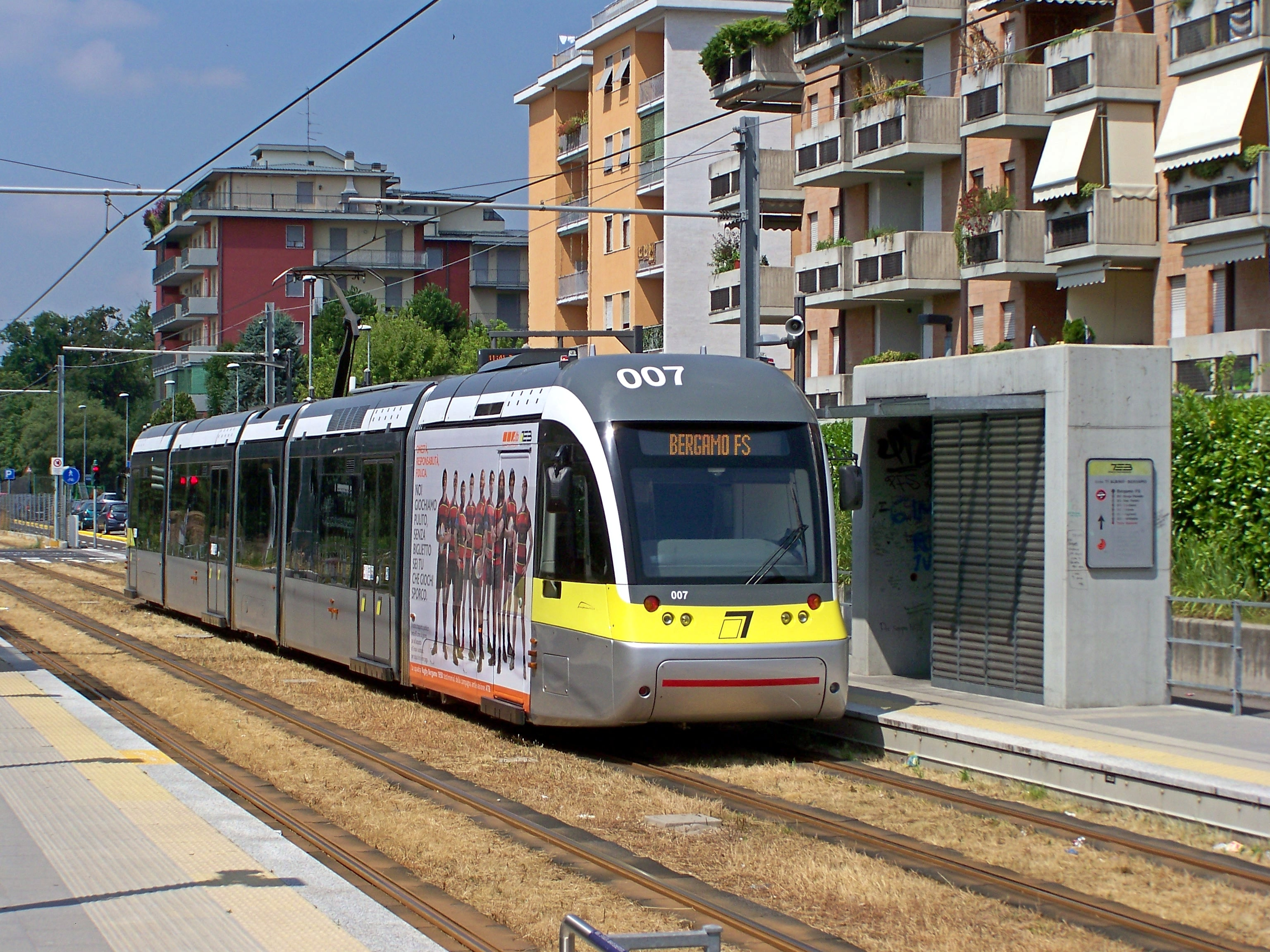
- Sirio Light rail car no. 007 at Torre Boldone

Overview
- Locale: Bergamo, Italy
- Transit type: Light rail
- Number of lines: 1
- Number of stations: 16
- Website: www.teb.bergamo.it/en

Operation
- Began operation: 24 April 2009
- Operator: TEB
- Number of vehicles: 14 AnsaldoBreda Sirio

Technical
- System length: 12.5 km (7.8 mi)
- No. of tracks: 2
- Track gauge: 1,435 mm (4 ft 8 1/2 in)
- Minimum radius of curvature: 100 m (330 ft)

The Bergamo–Albino light rail is a 12.5-kilometre (7.8 mi) light rail line, operated by TEB (Tramvie Elettriche Bergamasche), that connects the city of Bergamo, Italy, with the town of Albino, in the lower part of the Val Seriana. It was built on the right-of-way of the former Valle Seriana railway, closed in 1967. It opened for service on 24 April 2009.

== Sources ==
- Cleri, Claudio (September 2009). "Bergamo e il tram delle valli". I Treni (318): 25–29.
