= Piario =

- Comune
- Comune di Piario
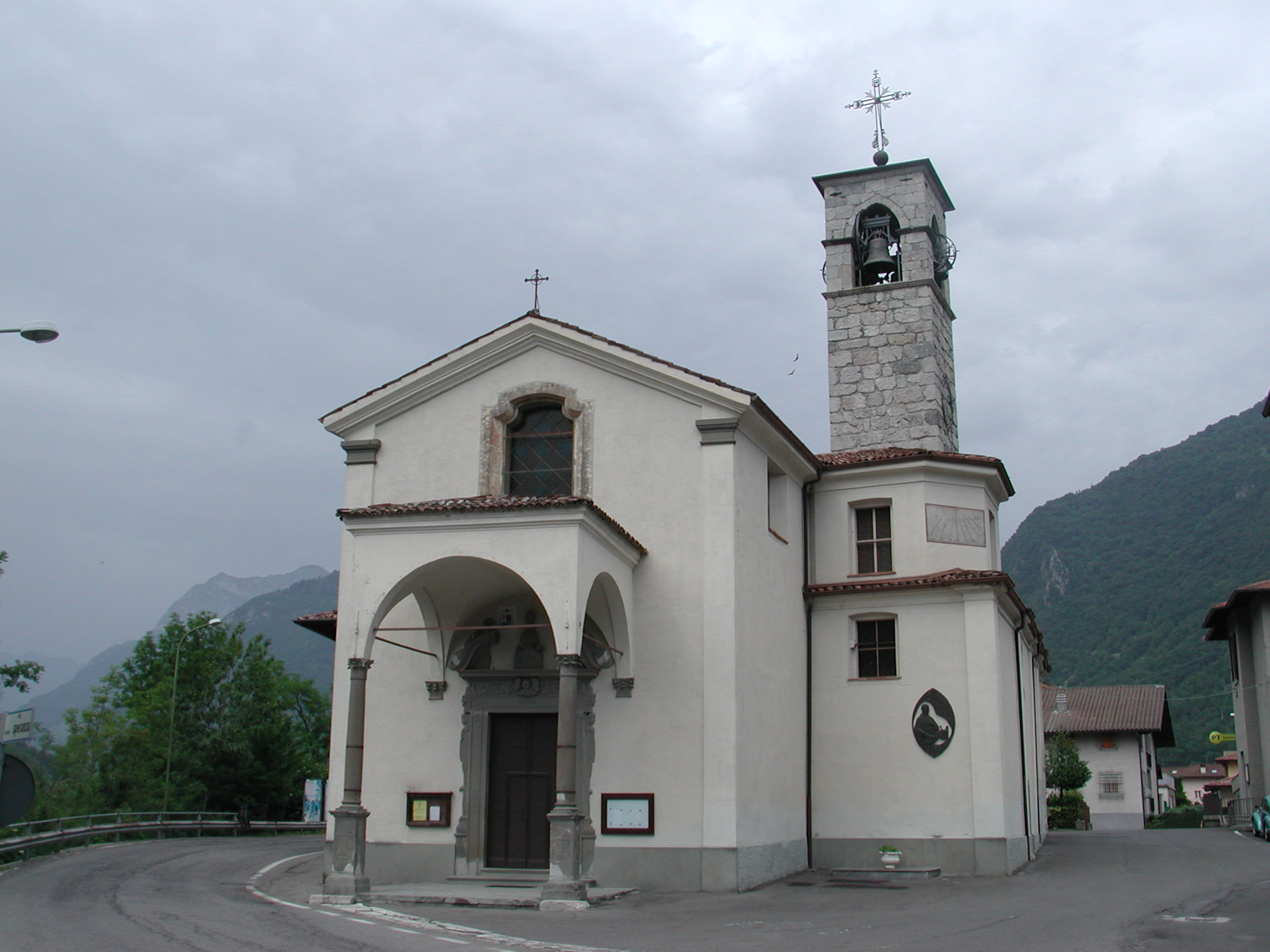
- Church

- Location within Italy Location within Lombardy
- Coordinates: 45°54′N 9°55′E
- Country: Italy
- Region: Lombardy
- Province: Province of Bergamo (BG)
- Frazioni: Groppino

Area
  - Total: 1.5 km^{2} (0.58 sq mi)
- Elevation: 539 m (1,768 ft)

Population (Dec. 2004)
  - Total: 990
  - Density: 660/km^{2} (1,700/sq mi)
- Demonym: Piariesi
- Time zone: UTC+1 (CET)
  - Summer (DST): UTC+2 (CEST)
- Postal code: 24020
- Dialing code: 0346
- Website: Official website

Piario (Bergamasque: Piér) is a comune (municipality) in the Province of Bergamo in the Italian region of Lombardy, located about 80 kilometres (50 mi) northeast of Milan and about 30 kilometres (19 mi) northeast of Bergamo. As of 31 December 2004, it had a population of 990 and an area of 1.5 square kilometres (0.58 mi^{2}).

The municipality of Piario contains the frazione (subdivision) Groppino.

Piario borders the following municipalities: Clusone, Parre, Villa d'Ogna.

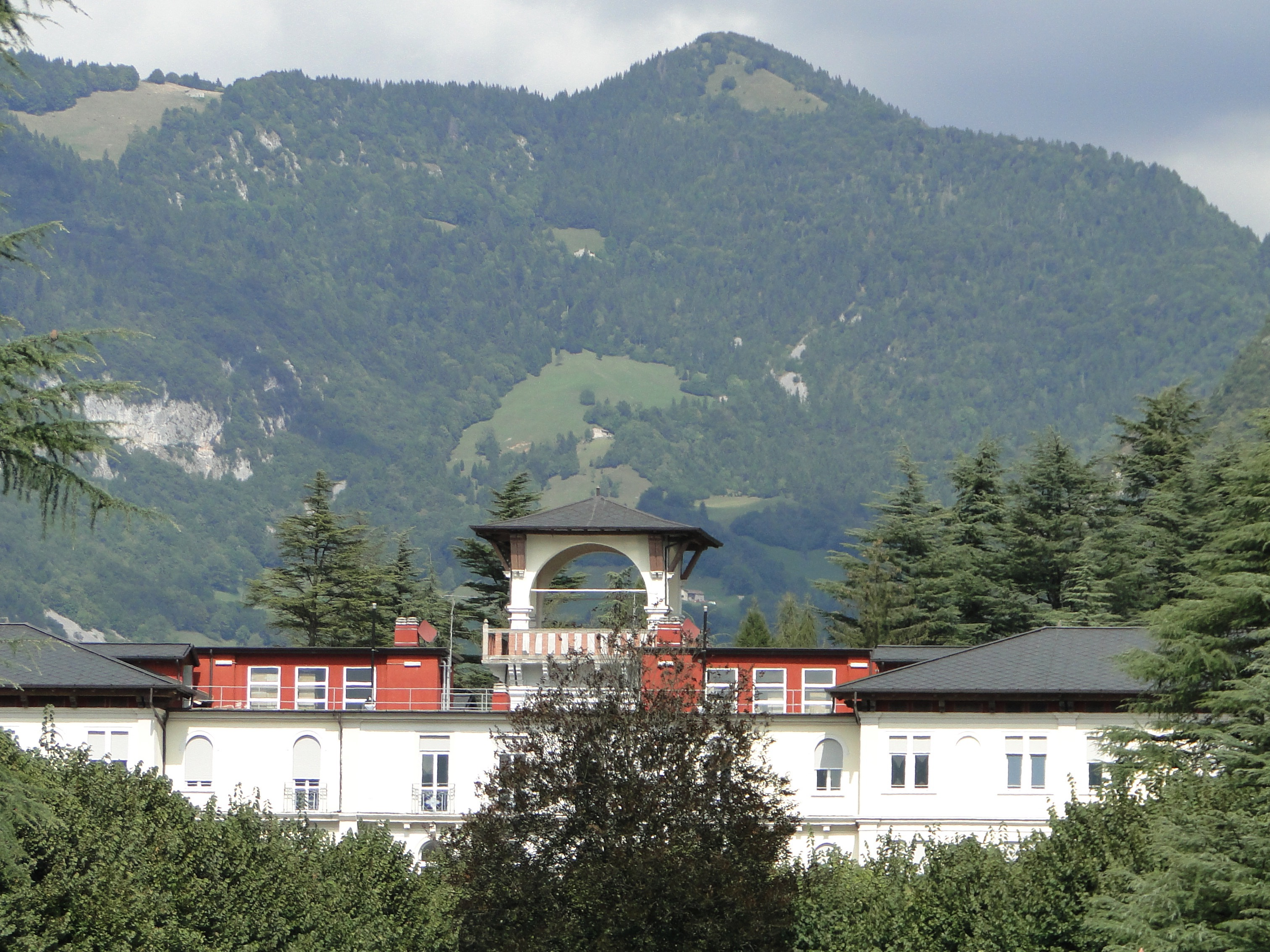
Hospital of Piario

== Demographic evolution ==
Historical population

| Year | Pop. | ±% |
|---|---|---|
| 1861 | 281 | — |
| 1871 | 281 | +0.0% |
| 1881 | 271 | −3.6% |
| 1901 | 440 | +62.4% |
| 1911 | 446 | +1.4% |

| Year | Pop. | ±% |
|---|---|---|
| 1921 | 581 | +30.3% |
| 1931 | 530 | −8.8% |
| 1936 | 550 | +3.8% |
| 1951 | 635 | +15.5% |
| 1961 | 672 | +5.8% |

| Year | Pop. | ±% |
|---|---|---|
| 1971 | 746 | +11.0% |
| 1981 | 788 | +5.6% |
| 1991 | 812 | +3.0% |
| 2001 | 918 | +13.1% |

Source: Data from ISTAT
