= Villongo =

- Comune
- Comune di Villongo
- Location within Italy Location within Lombardy
- Coordinates: 45°40′N 9°56′E
- Country: Italy
- Region: Lombardy
- Province: Province of Bergamo (BG)
- Frazioni: Sant'Alessandro, San Filastro

Area
  - Total: 5.93 km^{2} (2.29 sq mi)
- Elevation: 233 m (764 ft)

Population (Jan. 2017)
  - Total: 8,052
  - Density: 1,360/km^{2} (3,520/sq mi)
- Demonym: Villonghesi
- Time zone: UTC+1 (CET)
  - Summer (DST): UTC+2 (CEST)
- Postal code: 24060
- Dialing code: 035

Villongo (Bergamasque: Ilónch) is a comune (municipality) in the Province of Bergamo in the Italian region of Lombardy, located about 60 kilometres (37 mi) northeast of Milan and about 20 kilometres (12 mi) east of Bergamo. As of January 2017, it had a population of 8,052 and an area of 5.93 square kilometres (2.29 mi^{2}).

The municipality of Villongo contains two frazioni (subdivisions, mainly villages and hamlets): Sant'Alessandro and San Filastro.

Villongo borders the following municipalities: Adrara San Martino, Credaro, Foresto Sparso, Paratico, Sarnico, Zandobbio.

== Demographic evolution ==
Historical population

Year	Pop.	±%
1861	1,468	—
1871	1,533	+4.4%
1881	1,686	+10.0%
1901	1,987	+17.9%
1911	2,229	+12.2%

Year	Pop.	±%
1921	2,574	+15.5%
1931	2,662	+3.4%
1936	2,616	−1.7%
1951	2,656	+1.5%
1961	2,988	+12.5%

Year	Pop.	±%
1971	3,867	+29.4%
1981	5,128	+32.6%
1991	5,656	+10.3%
2001	6,396	+13.1%

Source: Data from ISTAT

== Infrastructure and accessibility ==
Between 1901 and 1921 the town hosted one stop of the Bergamo-Trescore-Sarnico tramway.

== Twin towns – sister cities ==
Villongo is twinned with:

- Seloncourt, France
