= Villa d'Ogna =

- Comune
- Comune di Villa d'Ogna
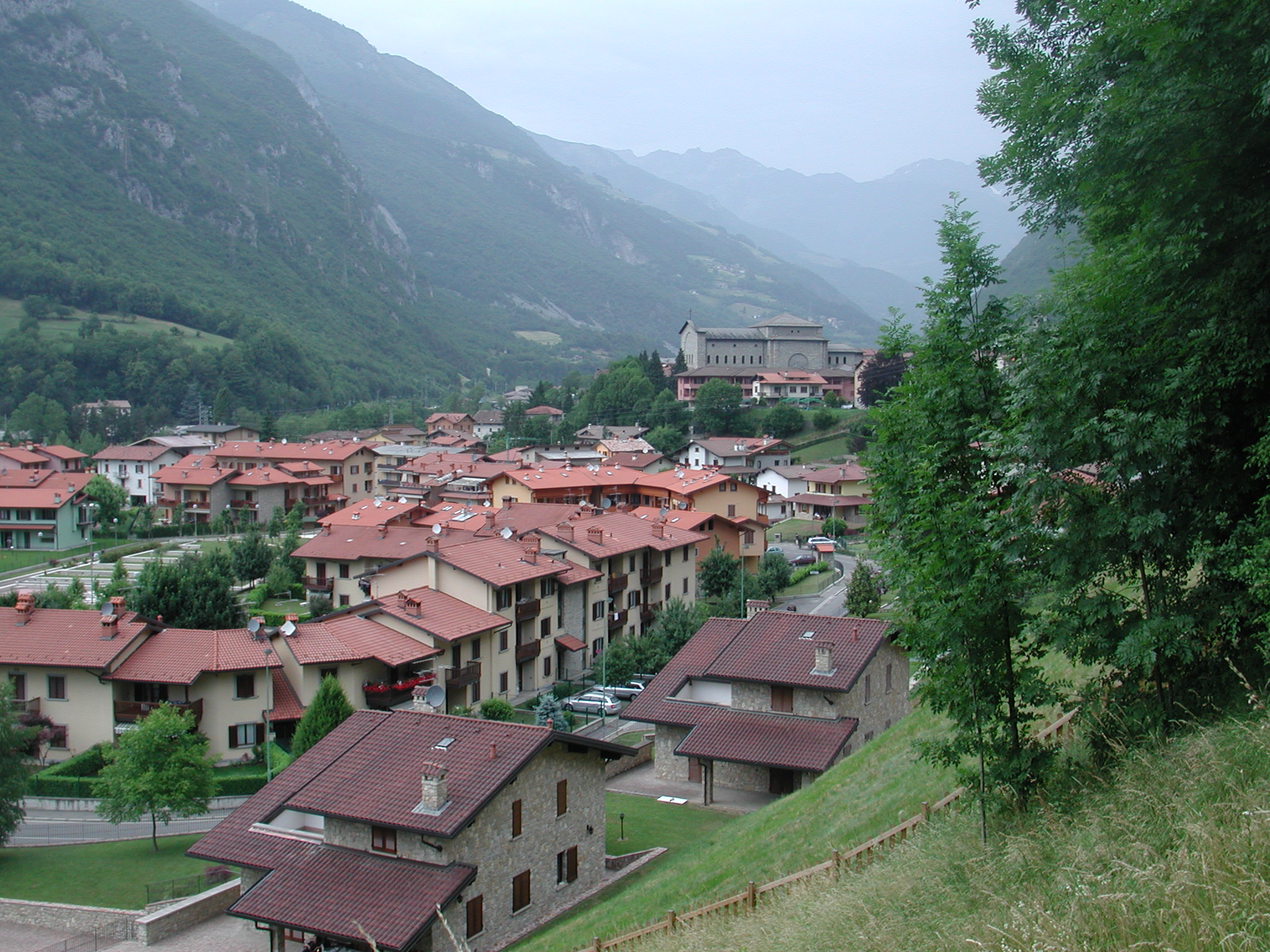
- Villa d'Ogna

- Location within Italy Location within Lombardy
- Coordinates: 45°54′N 9°56′E
- Country: Italy
- Region: Lombardy
- Province: Province of Bergamo (BG)

Area
  - Total: 5.2 km^{2} (2.0 sq mi)
- Elevation: 542 m (1,778 ft)

Population (Dec. 2004)
  - Total: 1,891
  - Density: 360/km^{2} (940/sq mi)
- Demonym: Villaonesi
- Time zone: UTC+1 (CET)
  - Summer (DST): UTC+2 (CEST)
- Postal code: 24020
- Dialing code: 0346

Villa d'Ogna (Bergamasque: Éla d'Ògna) is a comune (municipality) in the Province of Bergamo in the Italian region of Lombardy, located about 80 kilometres (50 mi) northeast of Milan and about 30 kilometres (19 mi) northeast of Bergamo. As of 2023, it had a population of 1,772 and an area of 5.2 square kilometres (2.0 mi^{2}).

Villa d'Ogna borders the following municipalities: Ardesio, Clusone, Oltressenda Alta, Parre, Piario, Rovetta.

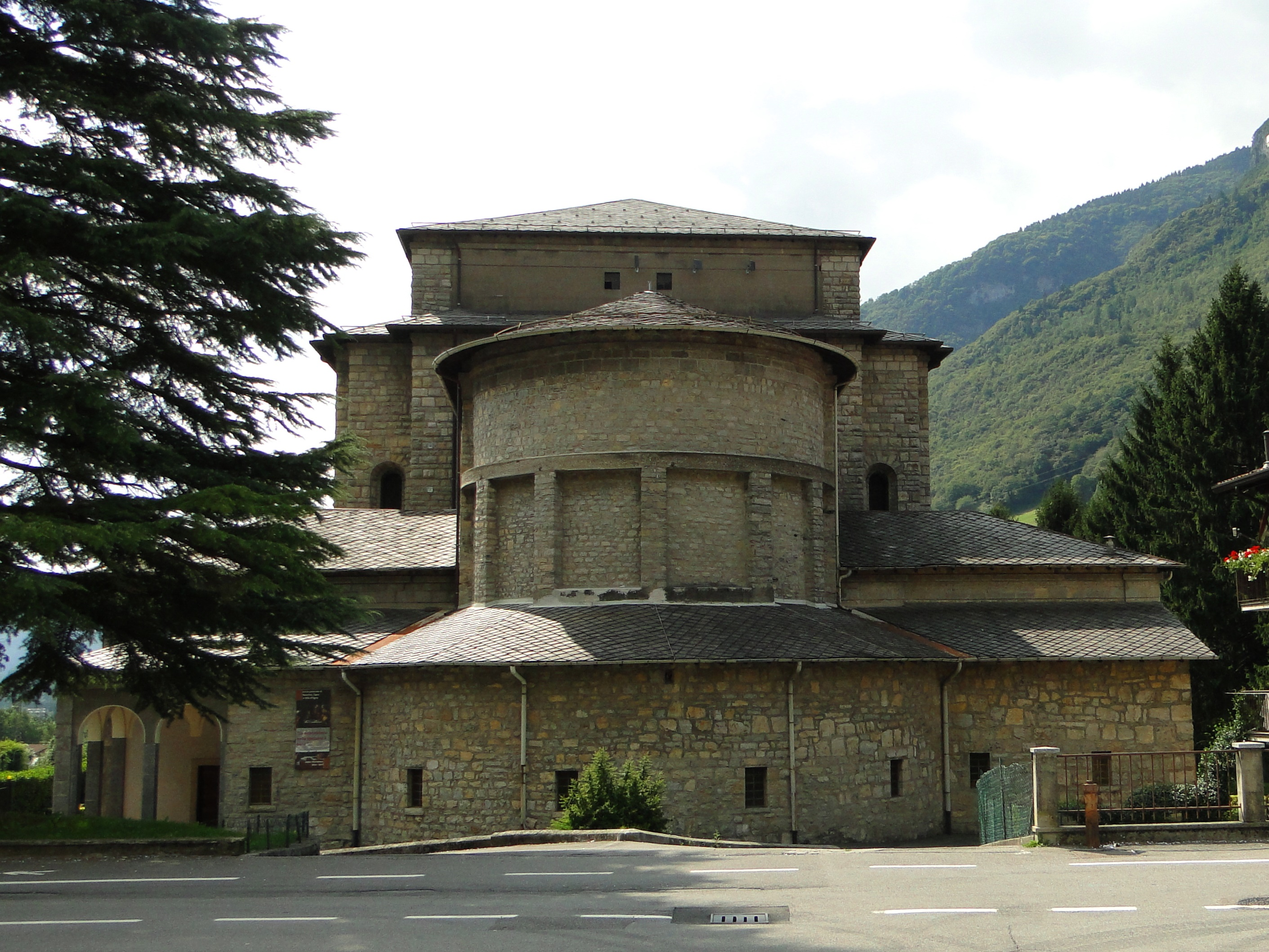
Parish church of Villa d'Ogna

== Demographic evolution ==
Historical population

Year	Pop.	±%
1861	643	—
1871	699	+8.7%
1881	666	−4.7%
1901	1,364	+104.8%
1911	1,586	+16.3%

Year	Pop.	±%
1921	2,016	+27.1%
1931	1,891	−6.2%
1936	1,908	+0.9%
1951	1,836	−3.8%
1961	1,990	+8.4%

Year	Pop.	±%
1971	1,727	−13.2%
1981	1,649	−4.5%
1991	1,682	+2.0%
2001	1,744	+3.7%

Source: Data from ISTAT
