= Gaverina Terme =

- Comune
- Comune di Gaverina Terme
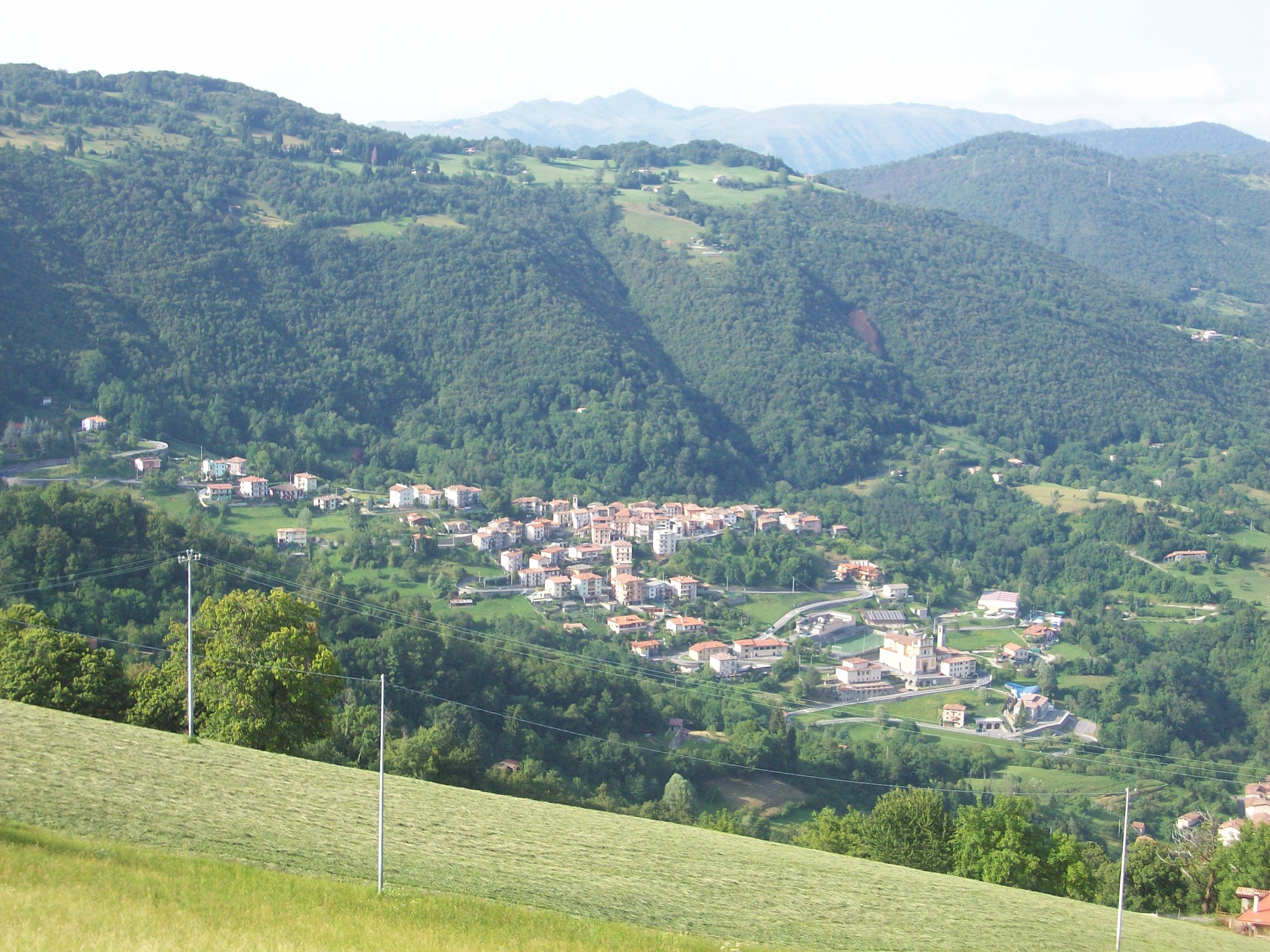

- Coat of arms

- Location within Italy Location within Lombardy
- Coordinates: 45°46′N 9°53′E
- Country: Italy
- Region: Lombardy
- Province: Bergamo (BG)

Government
  - Mayor: Denis Flaccadori

Area
  - Total: 5.2 km^{2} (2.0 sq mi)
- Elevation: 509 m (1,670 ft)

Population (2010)
  - Total: 932
  - Density: 180/km^{2} (460/sq mi)
- Demonym: Gaverinesi
- Time zone: UTC+1 (CET)
  - Summer (DST): UTC+2 (CEST)
- Postal code: 24060
- Dialing code: 035

Gaverina Terme (Bergamasque: Gaerina) is a comune (municipality) in the Province of Bergamo in the Italian region of Lombardy, located about 70 kilometres (43 mi) northeast of Milan and about 20 kilometres (12 mi) northeast of Bergamo.

Gaverina Terme borders the following municipalities: Albino, Bianzano, Casazza, Cene, Spinone al Lago.
