= Foresto Sparso =

- Comune
- Comune di Foresto Sparso
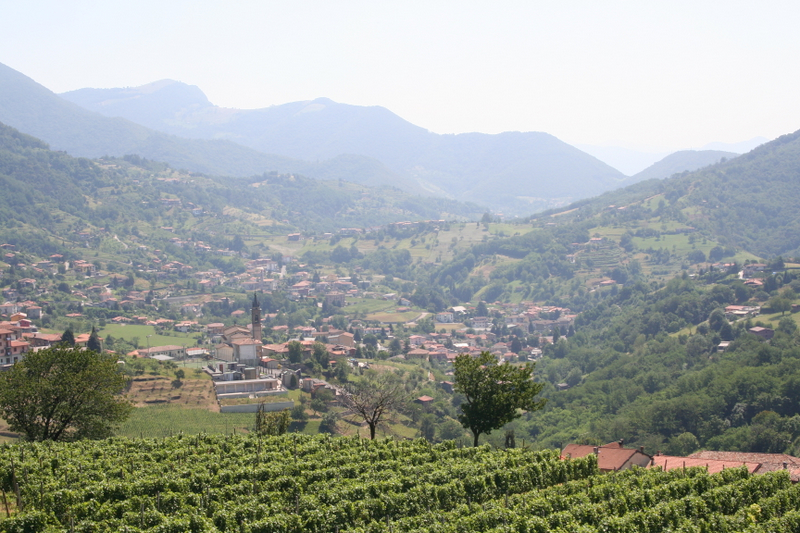
- Foresto Sparso

- Location within Italy Location within Lombardy
- Coordinates: 45°42′N 9°54′E
- Country: Italy
- Region: Lombardy
- Province: Province of Bergamo (BG)

Area
  - Total: 7.7 km^{2} (3.0 sq mi)
- Elevation: 346 m (1,135 ft)

Population (Dec. 2004)
  - Total: 2,983
  - Density: 390/km^{2} (1,000/sq mi)
- Demonym: Forestesi
- Time zone: UTC+1 (CET)
  - Summer (DST): UTC+2 (CEST)
- Postal code: 24060
- Dialing code: 035

Foresto Sparso (Bergamasque: Forèst) is a comune (municipality) in the Province of Bergamo in the Italian region of Lombardy, located about 60 kilometres (37 mi) northeast of Milan and about 20 kilometres (12 mi) east of Bergamo. As of 31 December 2004, it had a population of 2,983 and an area of 7.7 square kilometres (3.0 mi^{2}).

Foresto Sparso borders the following municipalities: Adrara San Martino, Berzo San Fermo, Entratico, Villongo, Zandobbio.

== Demographic evolution ==
Historical population

Year	Pop.	±%
1861	1,170	—
1871	1,188	+1.5%
1881	1,241	+4.5%
1901	1,495	+20.5%
1911	1,609	+7.6%

Year	Pop.	±%
1921	1,868	+16.1%
1931	2,033	+8.8%
1936	2,137	+5.1%
1951	2,281	+6.7%
1961	2,324	+1.9%

Year	Pop.	±%
1971	2,296	−1.2%
1981	2,285	−0.5%
1991	2,387	+4.5%
2001	2,847	+19.3%

Source: Data from ISTAT
