= Zandobbio =

- Comune
- Comune di Zandobbio
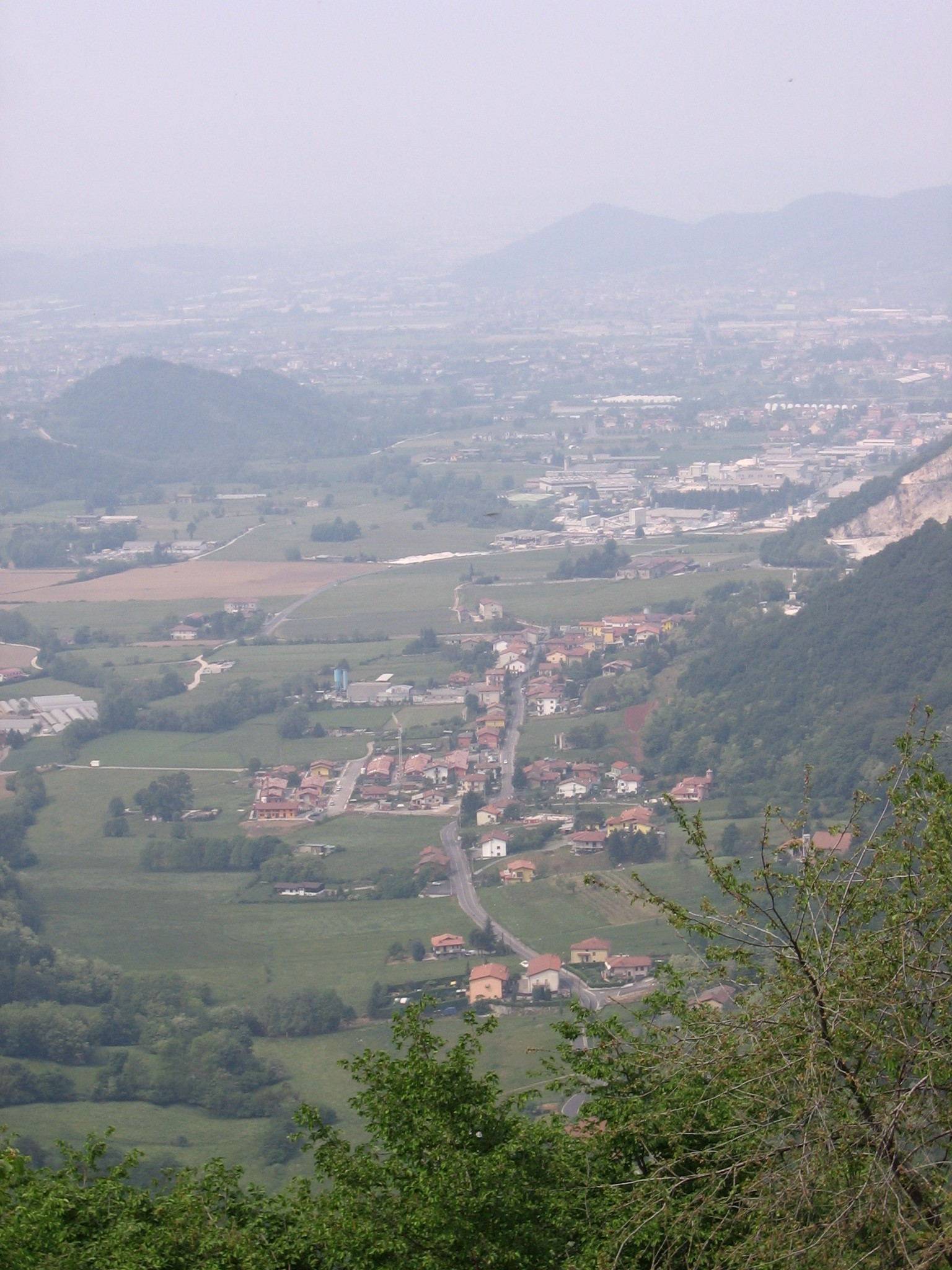
- Zandobbio

- Location within Italy Location within Lombardy
- Coordinates: 45°40′N 9°56′E
- Country: Italy
- Region: Lombardy
- Province: Province of Bergamo (BG)

Area
  - Total: 6.5 km^{2} (2.5 sq mi)
- Elevation: 278 m (912 ft)

Population (Dec. 2004)
  - Total: 2,412
  - Density: 370/km^{2} (960/sq mi)
- Demonym: Zandobbiesi
- Time zone: UTC+1 (CET)
  - Summer (DST): UTC+2 (CEST)
- Postal code: 24060
- Dialing code: 035

Zandobbio (Bergamasque: Zandòbe) is a comune (municipality) in the Province of Bergamo in the Italian region of Lombardy, located about 60 kilometres (37 mi) northeast of Milan and about 20 kilometres (12 mi) east of Bergamo. As of 31 December 2004, it had a population of 2,412 and an area of 6.5 square kilometres (2.5 mi^{2}).

Zandobbio borders the following municipalities: Credaro, Entratico, Foresto Sparso, Trescore Balneario, Villongo.

== Demographic evolution ==
Historical population

Year	Pop.	±%
1861	1,198	—
1871	1,229	+2.6%
1881	1,294	+5.3%
1901	1,541	+19.1%
1911	1,700	+10.3%

Year	Pop.	±%
1921	1,758	+3.4%
1931	1,938	+10.2%
1936	1,962	+1.2%
1951	2,003	+2.1%
1961	2,230	+11.3%

Year	Pop.	±%
1971	2,187	−1.9%
1981	2,080	−4.9%
1991	2,039	−2.0%
2001	2,281	+11.9%

Source: Data from ISTAT
