= Casazza =

- Comune
- Comune di Casazza
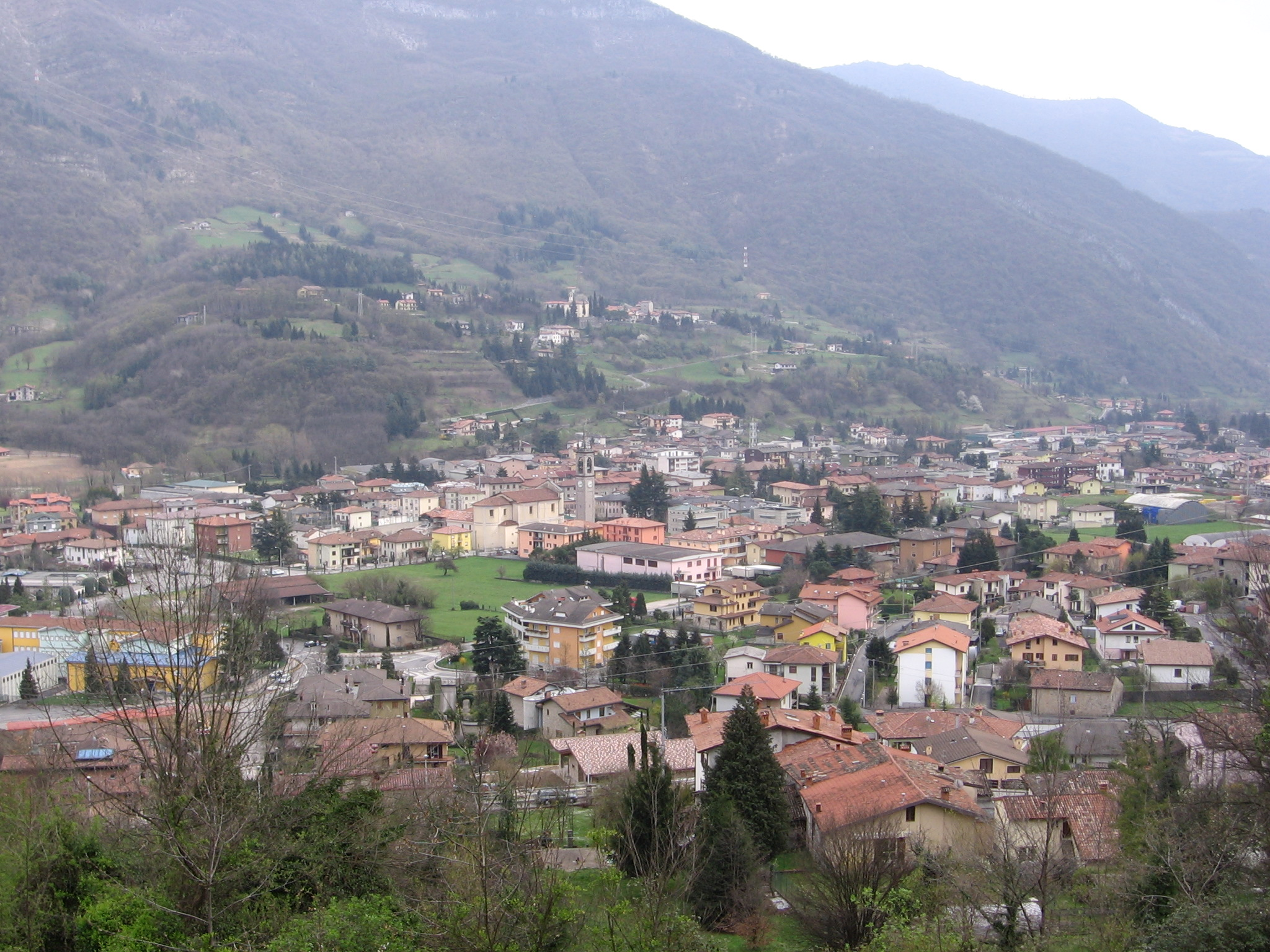
- Casazza

- Coat of arms

- Location within Italy Location within Lombardy
- Coordinates: 45°45′N 9°54′E
- Country: Italy
- Region: Lombardy
- Province: Province of Bergamo (BG)

Area
  - Total: 7.1 km^{2} (2.7 sq mi)
- Elevation: 349 m (1,145 ft)

Population (2010)
  - Total: 4,053
  - Density: 570/km^{2} (1,500/sq mi)
- Demonym: Casazzesi
- Time zone: UTC+1 (CET)
  - Summer (DST): UTC+2 (CEST)
- Postal code: 24060
- Dialing code: 035

Casazza (Bergamasque: Casàssa; formerly Mologno) is a comune (municipality) in the Province of Bergamo in the Italian region of Lombardy, located about 70 kilometres (43 mi) northeast of Milan and about 20 kilometres (12 mi) northeast of Bergamo. As of 31 December 2004, it had a population of 3,649 and an area of 7.1 square kilometres (2.7 mi^{2}).

Casazza borders the following municipalities: Albino, Gaverina Terme, Grone, Monasterolo del Castello, Spinone al Lago, Vigano San Martino.

== Demographic evolution ==
Historical population

Year	Pop.	±%
1861	1,050	—
1871	1,210	+15.2%
1881	1,281	+5.9%
1901	1,587	+23.9%
1911	1,780	+12.2%

Year	Pop.	±%
1921	1,956	+9.9%
1931	2,175	+11.2%
1936	1,931	−11.2%
1951	2,302	+19.2%
1961	2,402	+4.3%

Year	Pop.	±%
1971	2,729	+13.6%
1981	3,162	+15.9%
1991	3,266	+3.3%
2001	3,478	+6.5%

Source: Data from ISTAT
