= Parre =

- Comune
- Comune di Parre
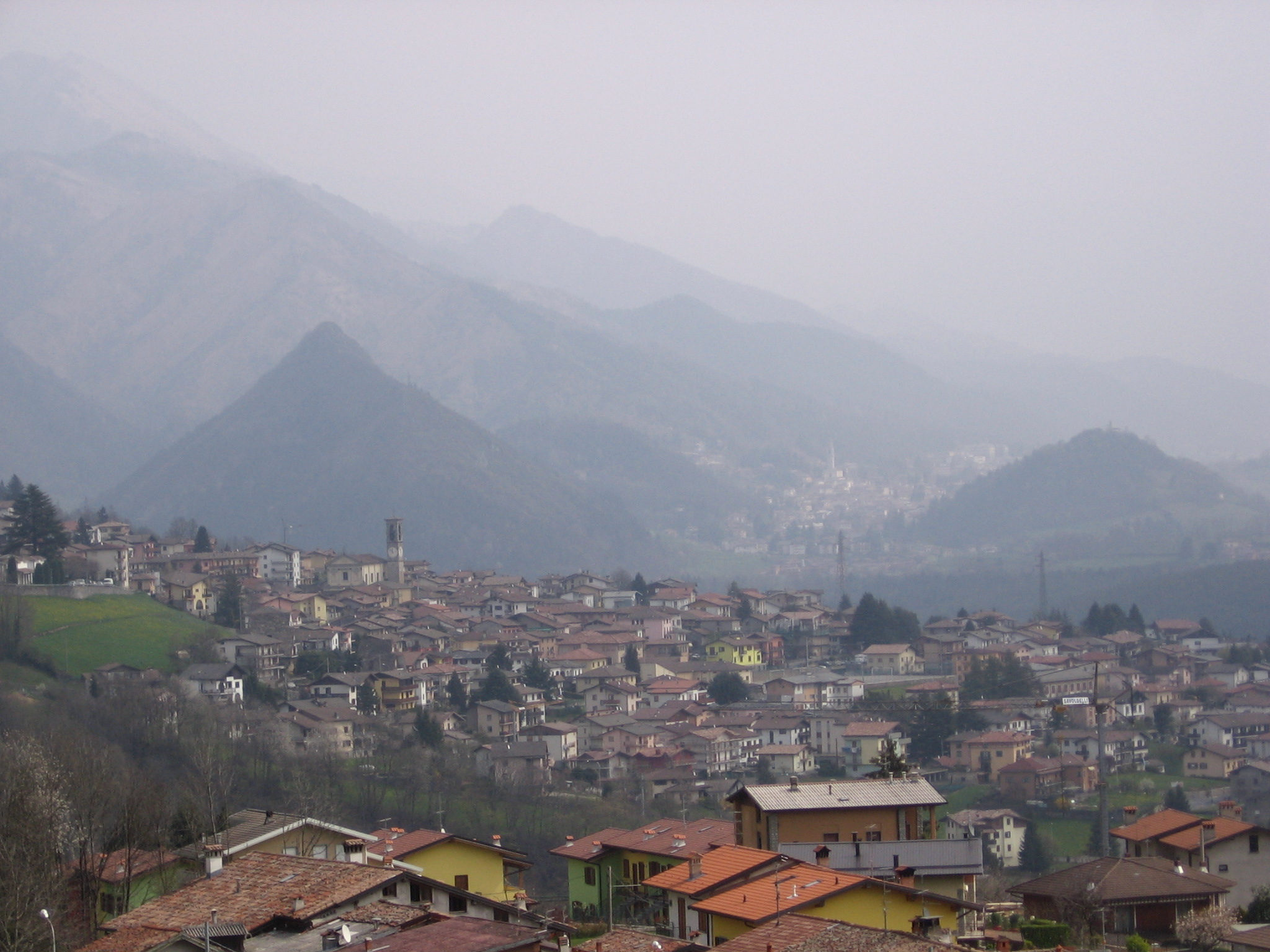

- Location within Italy Location within Lombardy
- Coordinates: 45°52′N 9°54′E
- Country: Italy
- Region: Lombardy
- Province: Province of Bergamo (BG)
- Frazioni: Ponte Selva, Sant' Alberto, Martorasco

Area
  - Total: 22.5 km^{2} (8.7 sq mi)
- Elevation: 650 m (2,130 ft)

Population (Dec. 2004)
  - Total: 2,821
  - Density: 125/km^{2} (325/sq mi)
- Demonym: Parresi
- Time zone: UTC+1 (CET)
  - Summer (DST): UTC+2 (CEST)
- Postal code: 24020
- Dialing code: 035
- Website: Official website

Parre (Bergamasque: Par) is a comune (municipality) in the Province of Bergamo in the Italian region of Lombardy, located about 70 kilometres (43 mi) northeast of Milan and about 25 kilometres (16 mi) northeast of Bergamo. As of 31 December 2004, it had a population of 2,821 and an area of 22.5 square kilometres (8.7 mi^{2}).

The municipality of Parre contains the frazioni (subdivisions, mainly villages and hamlets) Ponte Selva, Sant' Alberto, and Martorasco.

Parre borders the following municipalities: Ardesio, Clusone, Piario, Ponte Nossa, Premolo, Villa d'Ogna.

Parish Church of Sacro Cuore di Gesù.

== Demographic evolution ==
Historical population

Year	Pop.	±%
1861	735	—
1871	761	+3.5%
1881	847	+11.3%
1901	1,238	+46.2%
1911	1,529	+23.5%

Year	Pop.	±%
1921	1,605	+5.0%
1931	1,793	+11.7%
1936	1,746	−2.6%
1951	1,862	+6.6%
1961	1,949	+4.7%

Year	Pop.	±%
1971	2,157	+10.7%
1981	2,355	+9.2%
1991	2,457	+4.3%
2001	2,706	+10.1%

Source: Data from ISTAT
