= Province of Bergamo =

Province of Bergamo Provincia di Bergamo (Italian) Proìnsa de Bèrghem (Lombard)
- Province
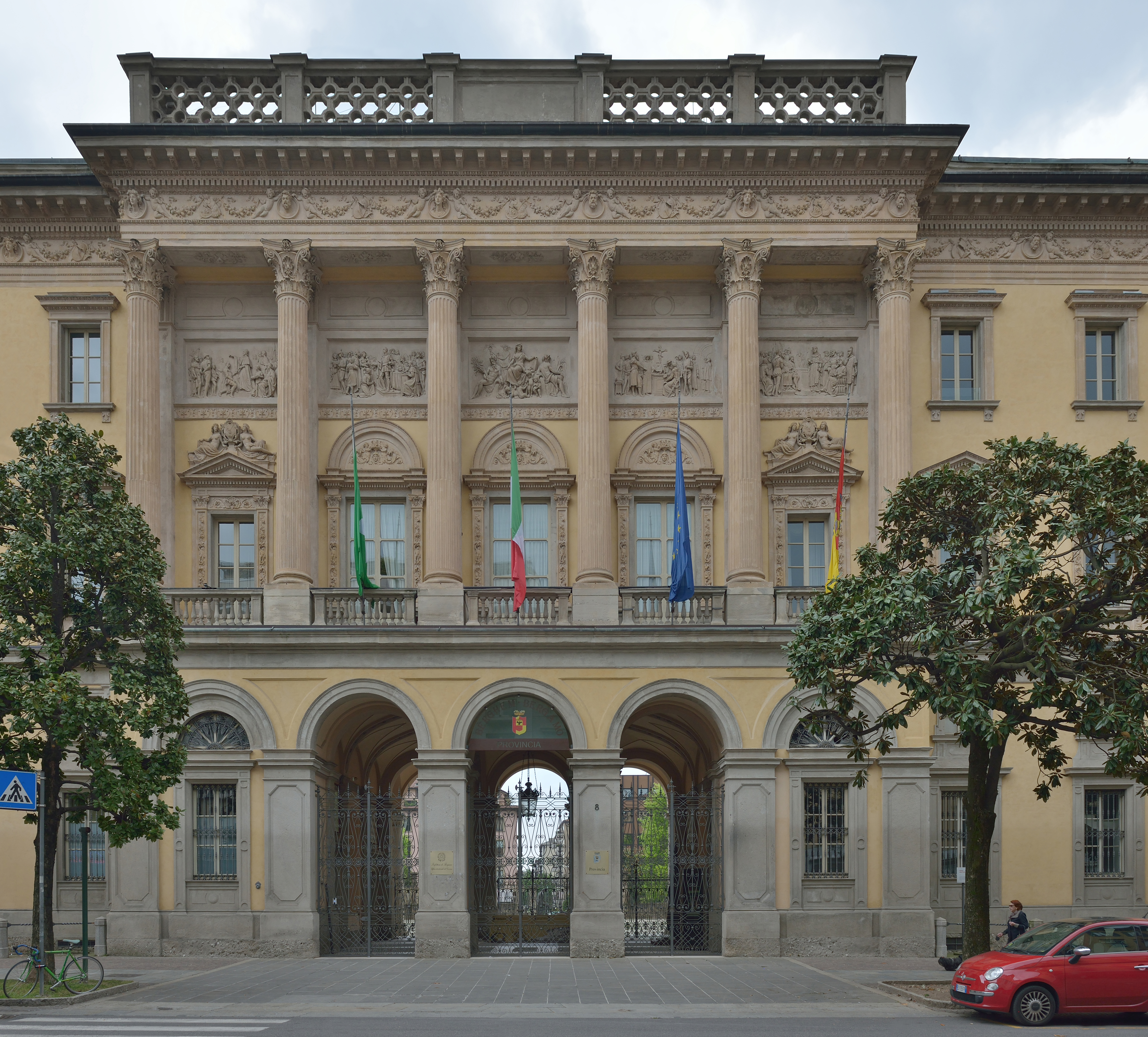
- The Palazzo della Provincia, the seat of the provincial administration.

- Coat of arms

- Location of the province of Bergamo in Italy
- Coordinates: 45°41′42″N 9°40′12″E
- Country: Italy
- Region: Lombardy
- Capital(s): Bergamo
- Municipalities: 243

Government
  - President: Gianfranco Gafforelli (FI)

Area
  - Total: 2,754.91 km^{2} (1,063.68 sq mi)

Population (2026)
  - Total: 1,119,233
  - Density: 406.268/km^{2} (1,052.23/sq mi)
- Demonym: Bergamascan or Bergamasque

GDP
  - Total: €33.795 billion (2015)
  - Per capita: €30,485 (2015)
- Time zone: UTC+1 (CET)
  - Summer (DST): UTC+2 (CEST)
- Postal code: 24000-24100
- Telephone prefix: 035, 0345, 0346, 0363, 02, 030
- ISO 3166 code: IT-BG
- Vehicle registration: BG
- ISTAT: 016

Map of the province of Bergamo

Map of the historical regions of Bergamo

Map of the municipalities of the province of Bergamo

The province of Bergamo (Italian: provincia di Bergamo; Bergamasque: proìnsa de Bèrghem) is a province in the region of Lombardy in northern Italy. Its capital is the city of Bergamo. The province has a population of 1,119,233 in an area of 2,754.91 square kilometers (1,063.68 sq mi) across its 243 municipalities.

== Geography ==
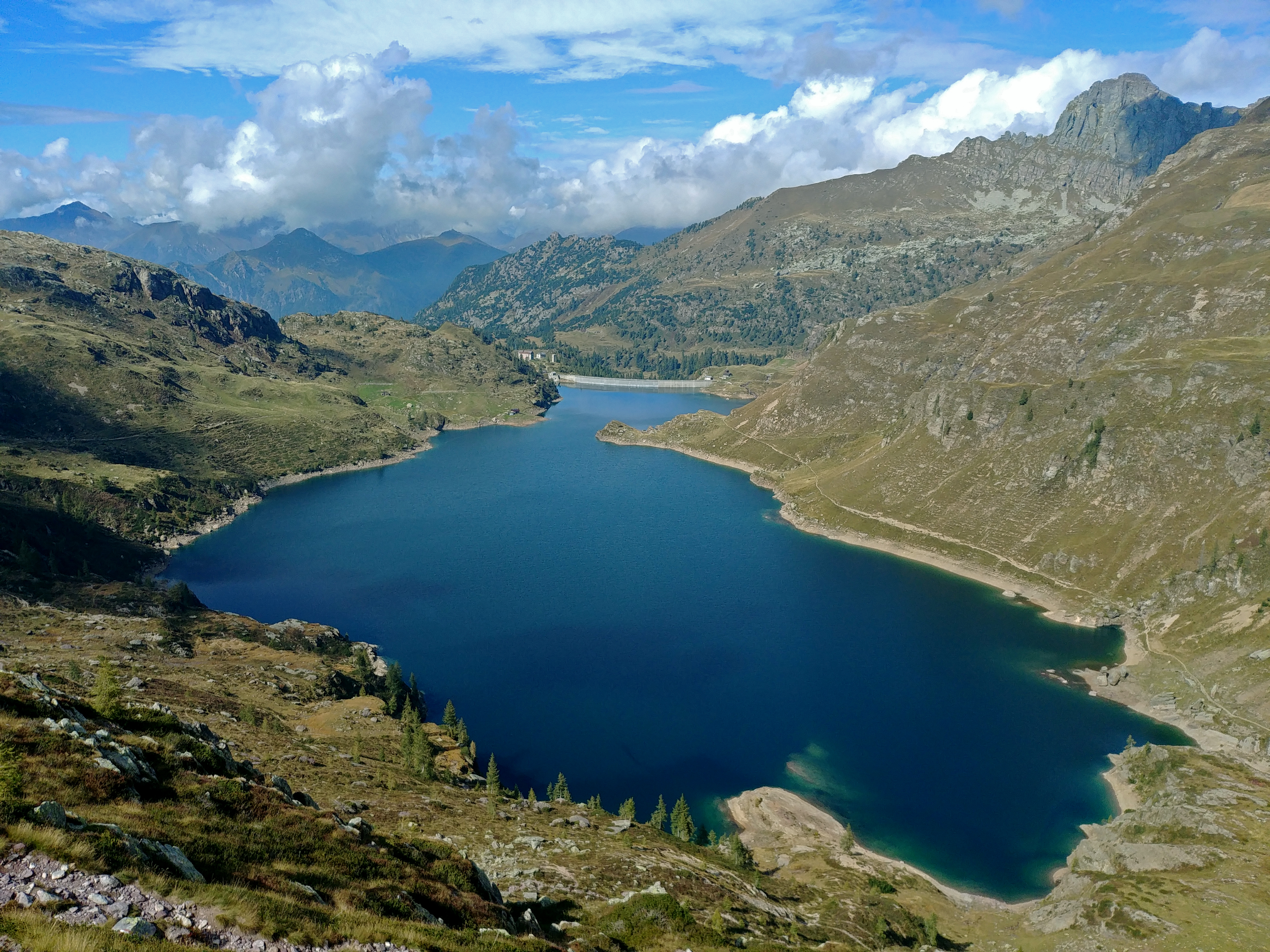
View of Laghi Gemelli

The province of Bergamo borders the province of Sondrio to the north, the province of Brescia to the east, the province of Cremona to the south and the Metropolitan City of Milan and the provinces of Monza and Brianza and Lecco to the west. The northern part spans the Orobian Alps with the highest point being Mount Coca at 3,052 meters (10,013 ft). Its rivers include the Serio, Dezzo, Cherio, Brembo, and Adda. Its valleys include the Seriana, Cavallina, and Brembana. Other, smaller but important valleys include the Valle Imagna, the Val di Scalve, the Val Brembilla, the Val Serina, and the Val Taleggio. The southern part is mainly made up of flatlands.

In the east, Lake Iseo forms its boundary which the Oglio from the Camonica Valley flows through. Minerals are found in the area of Trescore Balneario and San Pellegrino (the source of the mineral water of the same name) and other places.

=== Municipalities ===
- Adrara San Martino
- Adrara San Rocco
- Albano Sant'Alessandro
- Albino
- Algua
- Almè
- Almenno San Bartolomeo
- Almenno San Salvatore
- Alzano Lombardo
- Ambivere
- Antegnate
- Arcene
- Ardesio
- Arzago d'Adda
- Averara
- Aviatico
- Azzano San Paolo
- Azzone
- Bagnatica
- Barbata
- Bariano
- Barzana
- Bedulita
- Berbenno
- Bergamo
- Berzo San Fermo
- Bianzano
- Blello
- Bolgare
- Boltiere
- Bonate Sopra
- Bonate Sotto
- Borgo di Terzo
- Bossico
- Bottanuco
- Bracca
- Branzi
- Brembate
- Brembate di Sopra
- Brignano Gera d'Adda
- Brumano
- Brusaporto
- Calcinate
- Calcio
- Calusco d'Adda
- Calvenzano
- Camerata Cornello
- Canonica d'Adda
- Capizzone
- Capriate San Gervasio
- Caprino Bergamasco
- Caravaggio
- Carobbio degli Angeli
- Carona
- Carvico
- Casazza
- Casirate d'Adda
- Casnigo
- Cassiglio
- Castel Rozzone
- Castelli Calepio
- Castione della Presolana
- Castro
- Cavernago
- Cazzano Sant'Andrea
- Cenate Sopra
- Cenate Sotto
- Cene
- Cerete
- Chignolo d'Isola
- Chiuduno
- Cisano Bergamasco
- Ciserano
- Cividate al Piano
- Clusone
- Colere
- Cologno al Serio
- Colzate
- Comun Nuovo
- Corna Imagna
- Cornalba
- Cortenuova
- Costa di Mezzate
- Costa Serina
- Costa Valle Imagna
- Costa Volpino
- Covo
- Credaro
- Curno
- Cusio
- Dalmine
- Dossena
- Endine Gaiano
- Entratico
- Fara Gera d'Adda
- Fara Olivana con Sola
- Filago
- Fino del Monte
- Fiorano al Serio
- Fontanella
- Fonteno
- Foppolo
- Foresto Sparso
- Fornovo San Giovanni
- Fuipiano Valle Imagna
- Gandellino
- Gandino
- Gandosso
- Gaverina Terme
- Gazzaniga
- Ghisalba
- Gorlago
- Gorle
- Gorno
- Grassobbio
- Gromo
- Grone
- Grumello del Monte
- Isola di Fondra
- Isso
- Lallio
- Leffe
- Lenna
- Levate
- Locatello
- Lovere
- Lurano
- Luzzana
- Madone
- Mapello
- Martinengo
- Medolago
- Mezzoldo
- Misano di Gera d'Adda
- Moio de' Calvi
- Monasterolo del Castello
- Montello
- Morengo
- Mornico al Serio
- Mozzanica
- Mozzo
- Nembro
- Olmo al Brembo
- Oltre il Colle
- Oltressenda Alta
- Oneta
- Onore
- Orio al Serio
- Ornica
- Osio Sopra
- Osio Sotto
- Pagazzano
- Paladina
- Palazzago
- Palosco
- Parre
- Parzanica
- Pedrengo
- Peia
- Pianico
- Piario
- Piazza Brembana
- Piazzatorre
- Piazzolo
- Pognano
- Ponte Nossa
- Ponte San Pietro
- Ponteranica
- Pontida
- Pontirolo Nuovo
- Pradalunga
- Predore
- Premolo
- Presezzo
- Pumenengo
- Ranica
- Ranzanico
- Riva di Solto
- Rogno
- Romano di Lombardia
- Roncobello
- Roncola
- Rota d'Imagna
- Rovetta
- San Giovanni Bianco
- San Paolo d'Argon
- San Pellegrino Terme
- Sant'Omobono Terme
- Santa Brigida
- Sarnico
- Scanzorosciate
- Schilpario
- Sedrina
- Selvino
- Seriate
- Serina
- Solto Collina
- Solza
- Songavazzo
- Sorisole
- Sotto il Monte Giovanni XXIII
- Sovere
- Spinone al Lago
- Spirano
- Stezzano
- Strozza
- Suisio
- Taleggio
- Tavernola Bergamasca
- Telgate
- Terno d'Isola
- Torre Boldone
- Torre de' Busi
- Torre de' Roveri
- Torre Pallavicina
- Trescore Balneario
- Treviglio
- Treviolo
- Ubiale Clanezzo
- Urgnano
- Val Brembilla
- Valbondione
- Valbrembo
- Valgoglio
- Valleve
- Valnegra
- Valtorta
- Vedeseta
- Verdellino
- Verdello
- Vertova
- Viadanica
- Vigano San Martino
- Vigolo
- Villa d'Adda
- Villa d'Almè
- Villa d'Ogna
- Villa di Serio
- Villongo
- Vilminore di Scalve
- Zandobbio
- Zanica
- Zogno

== Demographics ==
Historical population
Year	Pop.	±%
1861	358,773	—
1871	375,183	+4.6%
1881	397,424	+5.9%
1901	459,889	+15.7%
1911	530,457	+15.3%
1921	570,284	+7.5%
1931	601,701	+5.5%
1936	594,934	−1.1%
1951	683,428	+14.9%
1961	729,551	+6.7%
1971	809,530	+11.0%
1981	875,624	+8.2%
1991	911,392	+4.1%
2001	974,873	+7.0%
2011	1,088,284	+11.6%
2021	1,102,997	+1.4%
Source: ISTAT (Note: Excluding the municipalities of Calolziocorte, Carenno, Erve, Monte Marenzo, and Vercurago, which were ceded to the newly-created Province of Lecco in 1992.)

As of 2026, the population is 1,119,233, of which 49.9% are male, and 50.1% are female. Minors make up 15.5% of the population, and seniors make up 23.3%.

=== Immigration ===
As of 2025, of the known countries of birth of 1,095,504 residents, the most numerous are: Italy (958,930 – 87.5%), Morocco (19,579 – 1.8%), Albania (14,473 – 1.3%), Romania (13,825 – 1.3%), India (12,383 – 1.1%), Senegal (11,368 – 1%), Pakistan (6,590 – 0.6%).

== Economy ==
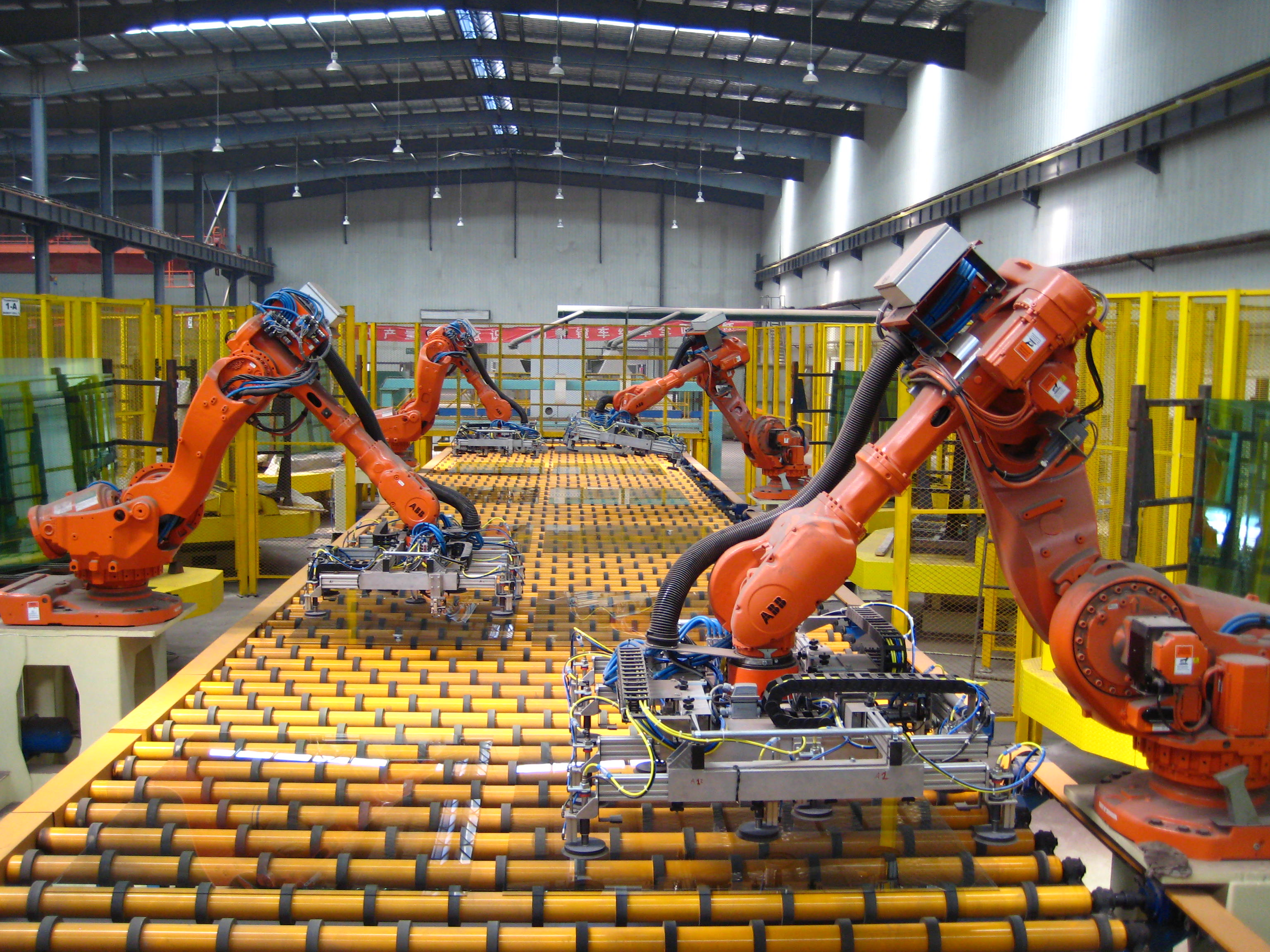
ABB plants

The low-lying areas are rich in pastures along with corn, wine, grain, rice and flax that are cultivated. Hunting is common. Very common is also the breeding of poultry, pigs with modern techniques, and the traditional sheep herding.

The provincial economy is based on SMEs, and varied products are made. The main heavy industries of the province of Bergamo are mineral processing, especially iron, concrete and marble. There is a large tractor plant, in Treviglio, a lot of global companies have a plant in Bergamo, like Tenaris and ABB in Dalmine. In Curno is placed the headquarter of Brembo which is also seated in Stezzano inside a famous technology area named Kilometro Rosso. Another international brand present is Alfa Laval in Suisio.

Silks, metallurgical products and clothing are also common products. A Heineken Italia brewery makes Moretti La Rossa in Comun Nuovo. Bergamo masons and assemblers are very famous for their ability and dedication to work.

== Transport ==
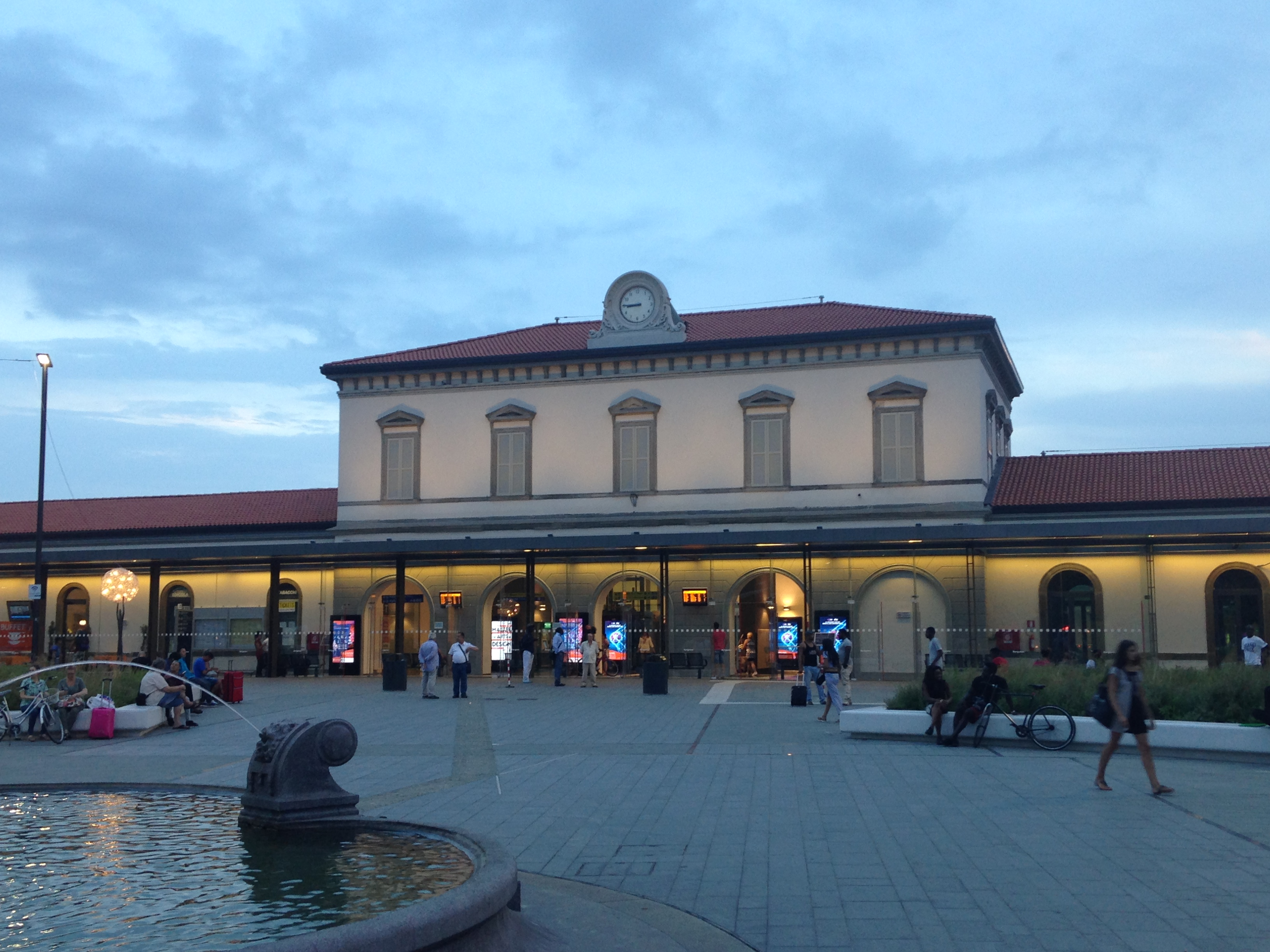
Bergamo railway station

=== Motorways ===
The province is crossed by the following motorways (in Italian, autostrade):

- Autostrada A4: Turin-Trieste
- Autostrada A35: Brescia-Bergamo-Milan
- Autostrada A36: Bergamo-Milan Malpensa Airport

=== Railway lines ===
- Milan–Venice railway
- Milan–Verona high-speed railway

== See also ==
- Monte Alben
- Lake Leffe
