= Entratico =

- Comune
- Comune di Entratico
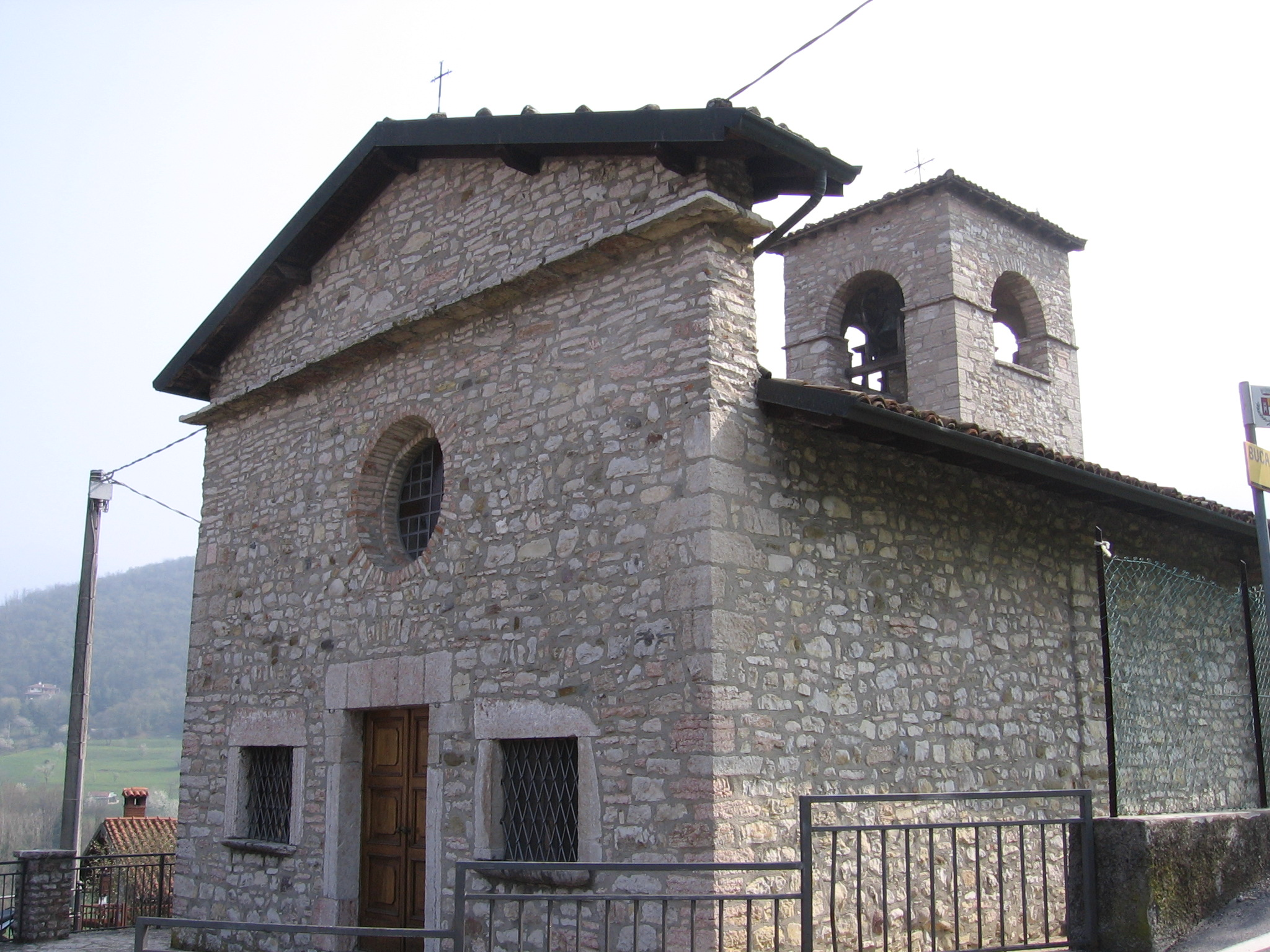
- Church

- Location within Italy Location within Lombardy
- Coordinates: 45°43′N 9°52′E
- Country: Italy
- Region: Lombardy
- Province: Province of Bergamo (BG)

Area
  - Total: 4.1 km^{2} (1.6 sq mi)
- Elevation: 299 m (981 ft)

Population (Dec. 2004)
  - Total: 1,620
  - Density: 400/km^{2} (1,000/sq mi)
- Demonym: Entratichesi
- Time zone: UTC+1 (CET)
  - Summer (DST): UTC+2 (CEST)
- Postal code: 24060
- Dialing code: 035

Entratico (Bergamasque: Entràdech) is a comune (municipality) in the Province of Bergamo in the Italian region of Lombardy, located about 60 kilometres (37 mi) northeast of Milan and about 15 kilometres (9.3 mi) east of Bergamo. As of 31 December 2004, it had a population of 1,620 and an area of 4.1 km^{2} (1.6 sq mi).

Entratico borders the following municipalities: Berzo San Fermo, Borgo di Terzo, Foresto Sparso, Luzzana, Trescore Balneario, Zandobbio.

== Demographic evolution ==
Historical population

Year	Pop.	±%
1861	642	—
1871	688	+7.2%
1881	780	+13.4%
1901	955	+22.4%
1911	1,055	+10.5%

Year	Pop.	±%
1921	1,133	+7.4%
1931	1,161	+2.5%
1936	995	−14.3%
1951	1,052	+5.7%
1961	1,075	+2.2%

Year	Pop.	±%
1971	1,163	+8.2%
1981	1,248	+7.3%
1991	1,354	+8.5%
2001	1,452	+7.2%

Source: Data from ISTAT
