= Vigano San Martino =

- Comune
- Comune di Vigano San Martino
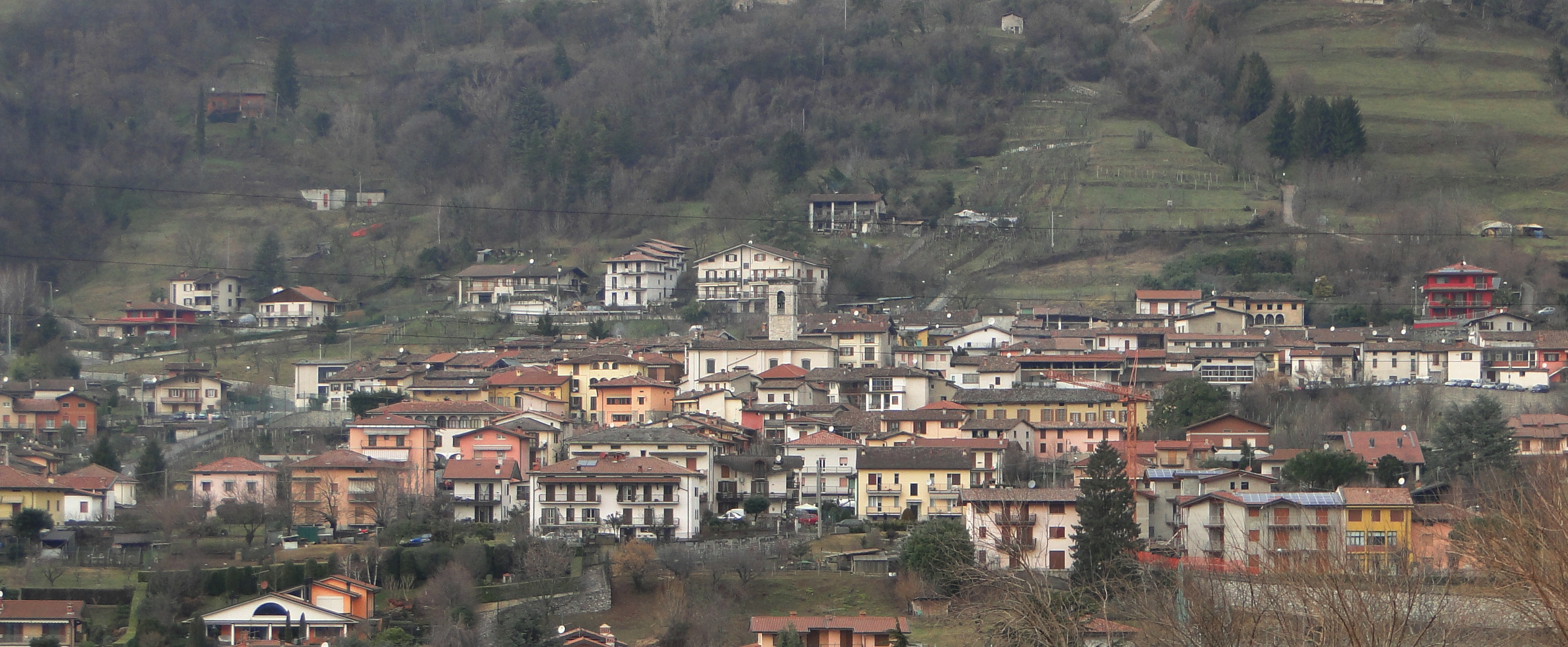
- Vigano San Martino

- Location within Italy Location within Lombardy
- Coordinates: 45°43′N 9°54′E
- Country: Italy
- Region: Lombardy
- Province: Bergamo (BG)

Government
  - Mayor: Massimo Armati

Area
  - Total: 3.76 km^{2} (1.45 sq mi)
- Elevation: 363 m (1,191 ft)

Population (30 November 2016)
  - Total: 1,336
  - Density: 355/km^{2} (920/sq mi)
- Demonym: Viganesi
- Time zone: UTC+1 (CET)
  - Summer (DST): UTC+2 (CEST)
- Postal code: 24060
- Dialing code: 035
- Website: Official website

Vigano San Martino (Bergamasque: Igà) is a comune (municipality) in the Province of Bergamo in the Italian region of Lombardy, located about 60 kilometres (37 mi) northeast of Milan and about 20 kilometres (12 mi) east of Bergamo.

Vigano San Martino borders the following municipalities: Albino, Berzo San Fermo, Borgo di Terzo, Casazza, Grone.
