= Grone, Lombardy =

Grone
- Comune
- Comune di Grone
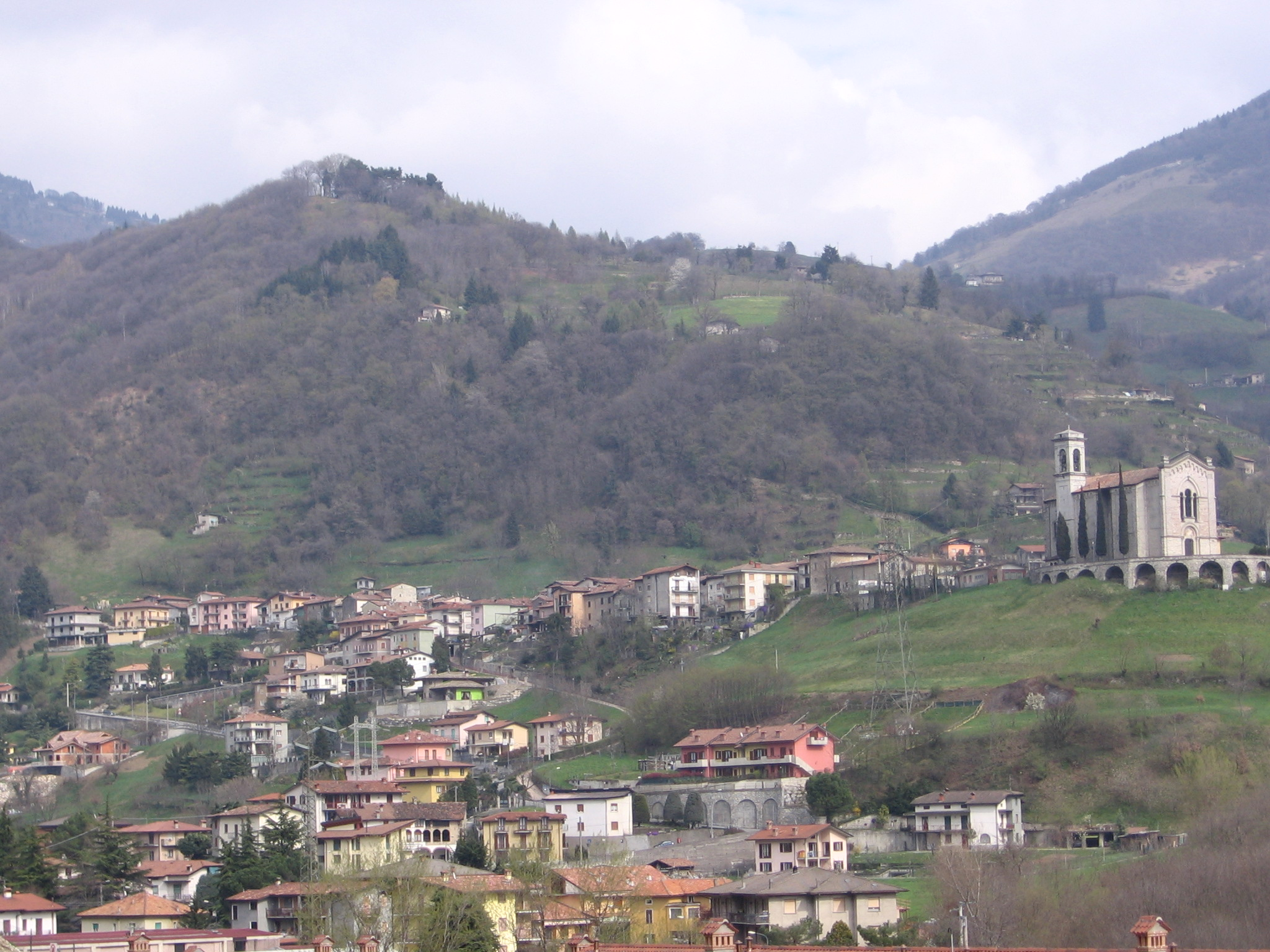
- Grone

- Location within Italy Location within Lombardy
- Coordinates: 45°44′N 9°55′E
- Country: Italy
- Region: Lombardy
- Province: Province of Bergamo (BG)

Area
  - Total: 7.8 km^{2} (3.0 sq mi)
- Elevation: 388 m (1,273 ft)

Population (Dec. 2004)
  - Total: 817
  - Density: 100/km^{2} (270/sq mi)
- Demonym: Gronesi
- Time zone: UTC+1 (CET)
  - Summer (DST): UTC+2 (CEST)
- Postal code: 24060
- Dialing code: 035

Grone (Bergamasque: Grù) is a comune (municipality) in the Province of Bergamo in the Italian region of Lombardy, located about 70 kilometres (43 mi) northeast of Milan and about 20 kilometres (12 mi) east of Bergamo. As of 31 December 2004, it had a population of 817 and an area of 7.8 square kilometres (3.0 mi^{2}).

Grone borders the following municipalities: Adrara San Martino, Berzo San Fermo, Casazza, Monasterolo del Castello, Vigano San Martino.

== Demographic evolution ==
Historical population

Year	Pop.	±%
1861	700	—
1871	736	+5.1%
1881	802	+9.0%
1901	893	+11.3%
1911	962	+7.7%

Year	Pop.	±%
1921	984	+2.3%
1931	916	−6.9%
1936	786	−14.2%
1951	841	+7.0%
1961	814	−3.2%

Year	Pop.	±%
1971	779	−4.3%
1981	749	−3.9%
1991	716	−4.4%
2001	730	+2.0%

Source: Data from ISTAT
