= Berzo San Fermo =

- Comune
- Comune di Berzo San Fermo
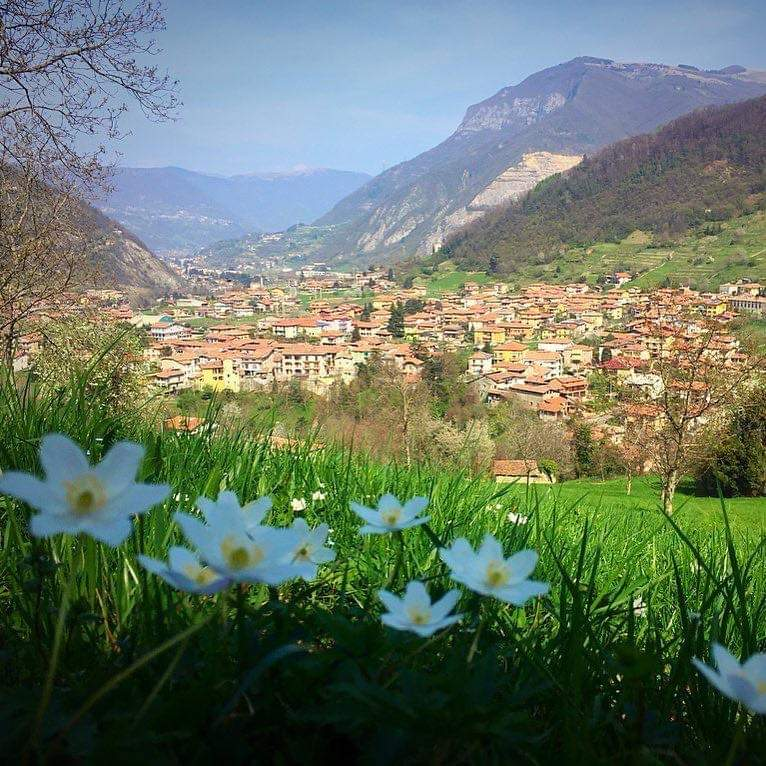
- Berzo San Fermo

- Coat of arms

- Location within Italy Location within Lombardy
- Coordinates: 45°43′N 09°54′E
- Country: Italy
- Region: Lombardy
- Province: Bergamo (BG)

Government
  - Mayor: Luciano Trapletti

Area
  - Total: 5.86 km^{2} (2.26 sq mi)
- Elevation: 365 m (1,198 ft)

Population (30 April 2017)
  - Total: 1,370
  - Density: 234/km^{2} (606/sq mi)
- Demonym: Berzesi
- Time zone: UTC+1 (CET)
  - Summer (DST): UTC+2 (CEST)
- Postal code: 24060
- Dialing code: 035
- Website: Official website

Berzo San Fermo (Bergamasque: Bèrs San Fìrem) is a comune in the province of Bergamo, in Lombardy.

== Bordering comuni ==
- Grone
- Adrara San Martino
- Foresto Sparso
- Entratico
- Borgo di Terzo
- Vigano San Martino

== Coat of arms ==
The coat of arms depicts a tree, a cow and a blue star on a yellow background.
