= Luzzana =

- Comune
- Comune di Luzzana
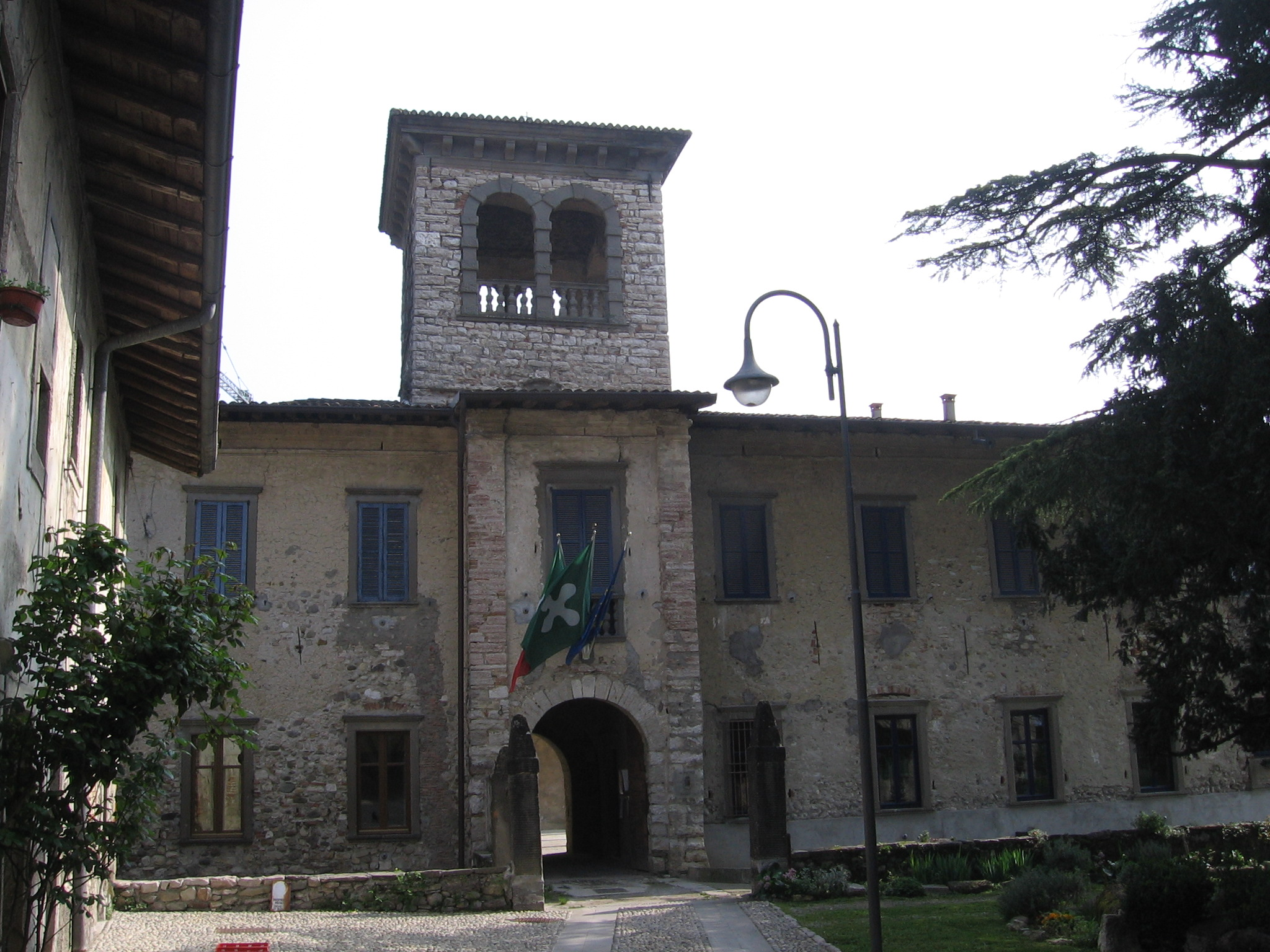
- Castle

- Location within Italy Location within Lombardy
- Coordinates: 45°43′N 9°53′E
- Country: Italy
- Region: Lombardy
- Province: Province of Bergamo (BG)

Area
  - Total: 3.4 km^{2} (1.3 sq mi)
- Elevation: 310 m (1,020 ft)

Population (Dec. 2004)
  - Total: 776
  - Density: 230/km^{2} (590/sq mi)
- Demonym: Luzzanesi
- Time zone: UTC+1 (CET)
  - Summer (DST): UTC+2 (CEST)
- Postal code: 24069
- Dialing code: 035

Luzzana (Bergamasque: Lössana) is a comune (municipality) in the Province of Bergamo in the Italian region of Lombardy, located about 60 kilometres (37 mi) northeast of Milan and about 15 kilometres (9 mi) east of Bergamo. As of 31 December 2004, it had a population of 776 and an area of 3.4 square kilometres (1.3 mi^{2}).

Luzzana borders the following municipalities: Albino, Borgo di Terzo, Entratico, Trescore Balneario.

== Demographic evolution ==
Historical population

Year	Pop.	±%
1861	342	—
1871	416	+21.6%
1881	424	+1.9%
1901	498	+17.5%
1911	583	+17.1%

Year	Pop.	±%
1921	659	+13.0%
1931	593	−10.0%
1936	586	−1.2%
1951	499	−14.8%
1961	460	−7.8%

Year	Pop.	±%
1971	429	−6.7%
1981	568	+32.4%
1991	617	+8.6%
2001	719	+16.5%

Source: Data from ISTAT
