= Borgo di Terzo =

- Comune
- Comune di Borgo di Terzo
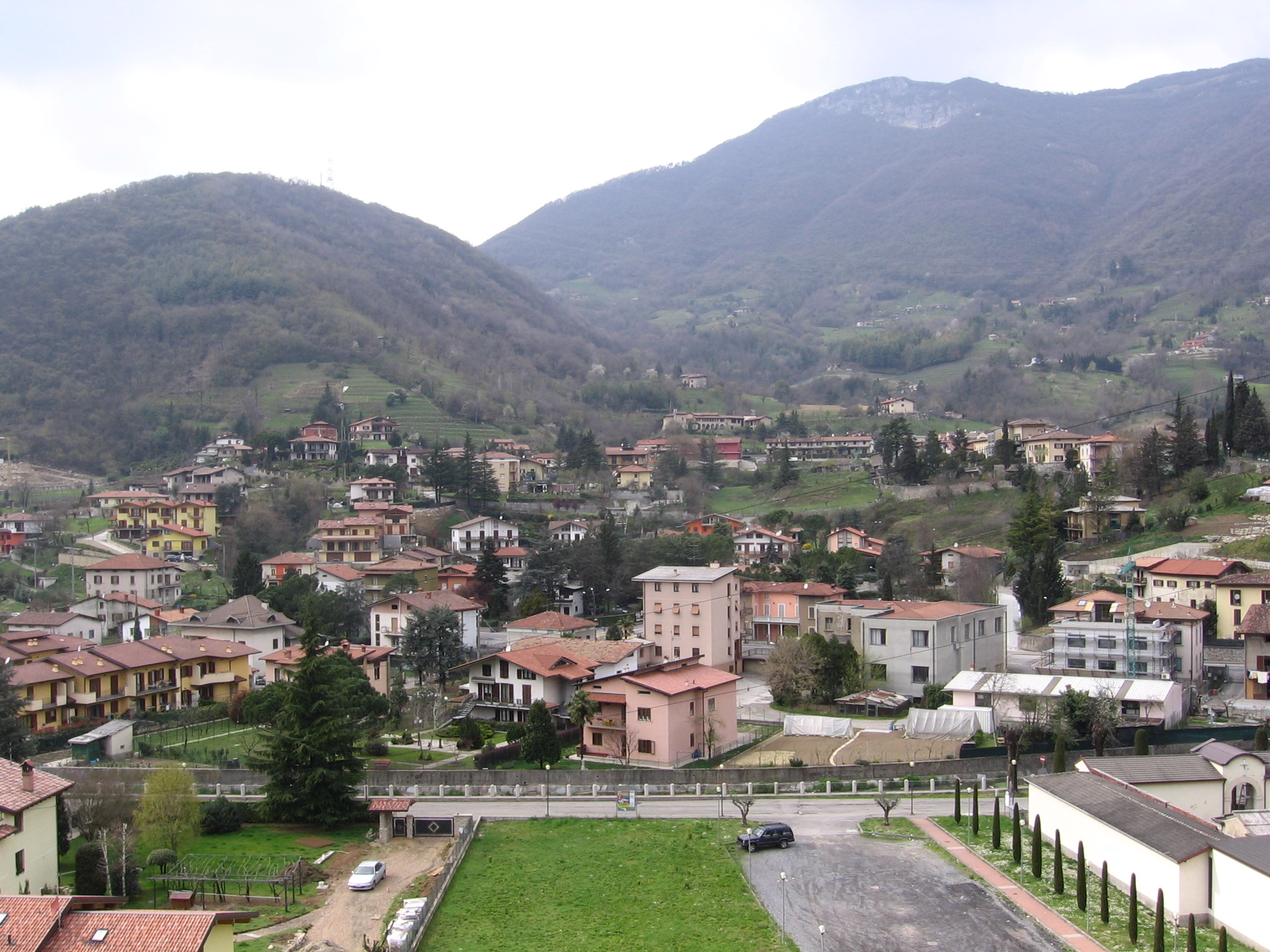
- View of Borgo di Terzo

- Flag Coat of arms

- Location within Italy Location within Lombardy
- Coordinates: 45°43′N 09°54′E
- Country: Italy
- Region: Lombardy
- Province: Bergamo (BG)

Government
  - Mayor: Mauro Antonio Fadini (since April 4, 2005)

Area
  - Total: 1 km^{2} (0.39 sq mi)
- Elevation: 300 m (980 ft)

Population (2011)
  - Total: 1,125
  - Density: 1,100/km^{2} (2,900/sq mi)
- Demonym: Borghesi
- Time zone: UTC+1 (CET)
  - Summer (DST): UTC+2 (CEST)
- Postal code: 24060
- Dialing code: 035

Borgo di Terzo (Bergamasque: Bórg de Tèrs) is a comune in the province of Bergamo, Lombardy, in northern Italy.

== Neighboring communes ==
- Entratico
- Vigano San Martino
- Berzo San Fermo
- Luzzana
