= Trescore Balneario =

- Comune
- Comune di Trescore Balneario
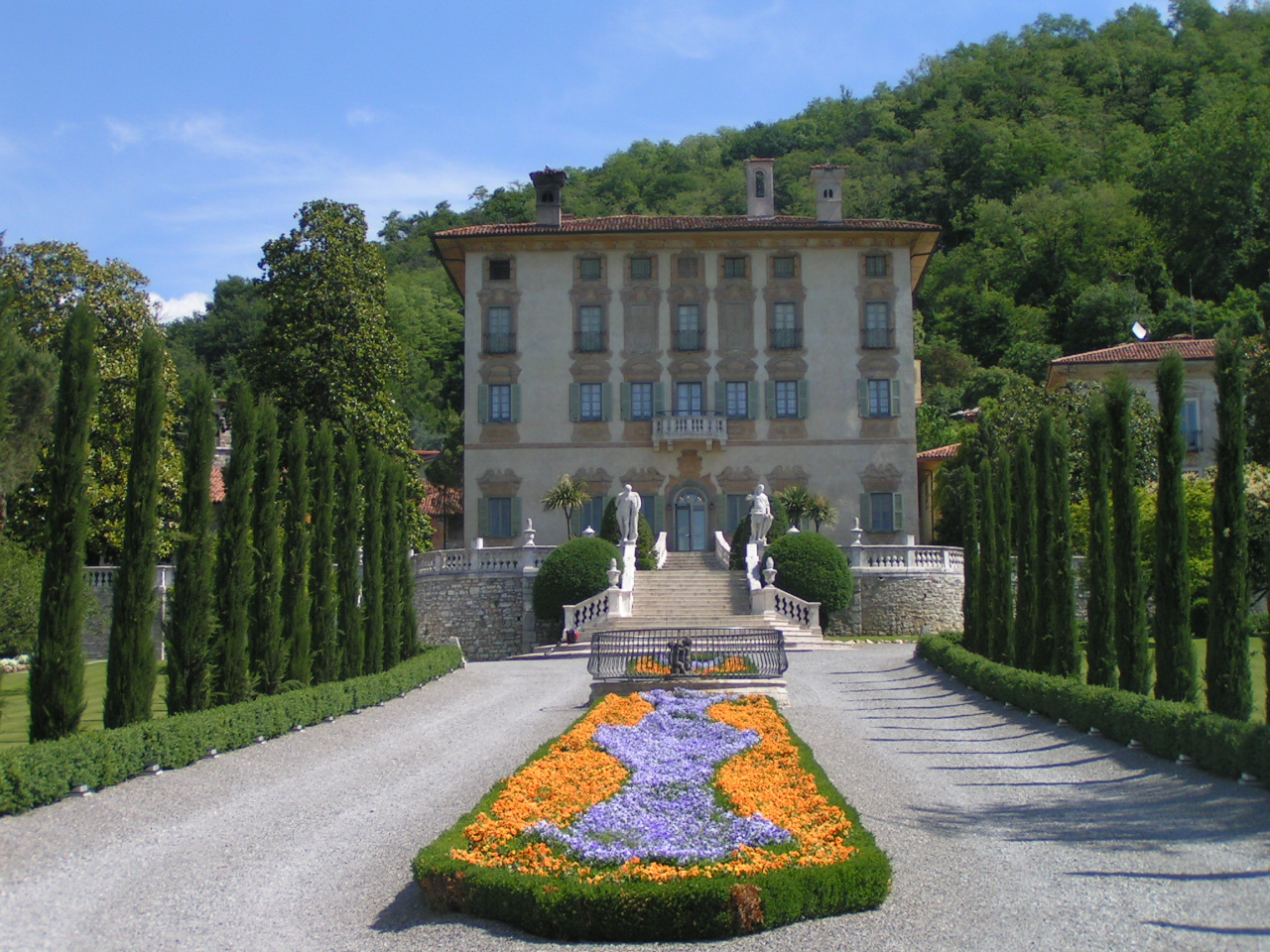
- Villa Terzi.

- Coat of arms

- Location within Italy Location within Lombardy
- Coordinates: 45°42′N 09°51′E
- Country: Italy
- Region: Lombardy
- Province: Bergamo (BG)
- Frazioni: Redona

Government
  - Mayor: Danny Benedetti

Area
  - Total: 13.51 km^{2} (5.22 sq mi)
- Elevation: 271 m (889 ft)

Population (31 May 2021)
  - Total: 9,527
  - Density: 705.2/km^{2} (1,826/sq mi)
- Demonym: Trescorensi
- Time zone: UTC+1 (CET)
  - Summer (DST): UTC+2 (CEST)
- Postal code: 24069
- Dialing code: 035
- Patron saint: Saint Peter and Saint Paul
- Saint day: 29 June
- Website: Official website

Trescore Balneario (Bergamasque: Trescùr Balneàre) is a town and comune in the Province of Bergamo, Lombardy, northern Italy. Located approximately 15 km east of Bergamo, it has always been the main centre of the lower Cavallina valley. First mentioned in a document from 996 as Trescurium, another town known as Leuceris was also shown here on maps of the Middle Ages, creating confusion as to the original name and location of the first settlement. It is known for its spas, inaugurated by the Romans (who called them thermae), which were heavily restored by Bartolomeo Colleoni starting in 1469.

== Demographics ==
Historical population

Year	Pop.	±%
1861	2,940	—
1871	2,977	+1.3%
1881	3,147	+5.7%
1901	3,639	+15.6%
1911	3,837	+5.4%
1921	4,058	+5.8%
1931	4,035	−0.6%
1936	4,145	+2.7%

Year	Pop.	±%
1951	4,577	+10.4%
1961	4,764	+4.1%
1971	5,736	+20.4%
1981	6,517	+13.6%
1991	7,075	+8.6%
2001	8,303	+17.4%
2011	9,427	+13.5%
2021	9,711	+3.0%

Source: ISTAT

== Main sights ==
- Suardi Chapel, in a private villa, containing frescoes by Lorenzo Lotto. Dating from 1524, they depict the lives of Saint Barbara and Saint Brigid.
- Church of Saint Peter (Trescore Balneario)
- Church of Saint Vincent (Trescore Balneario)
- Church of Saint Cassian (Trescore Balneario)

== Twin towns ==
- Zuera, Spain
- Čelákovice, Czech Republic
