= Vigolo =

- Comune
- Comune di Vigolo
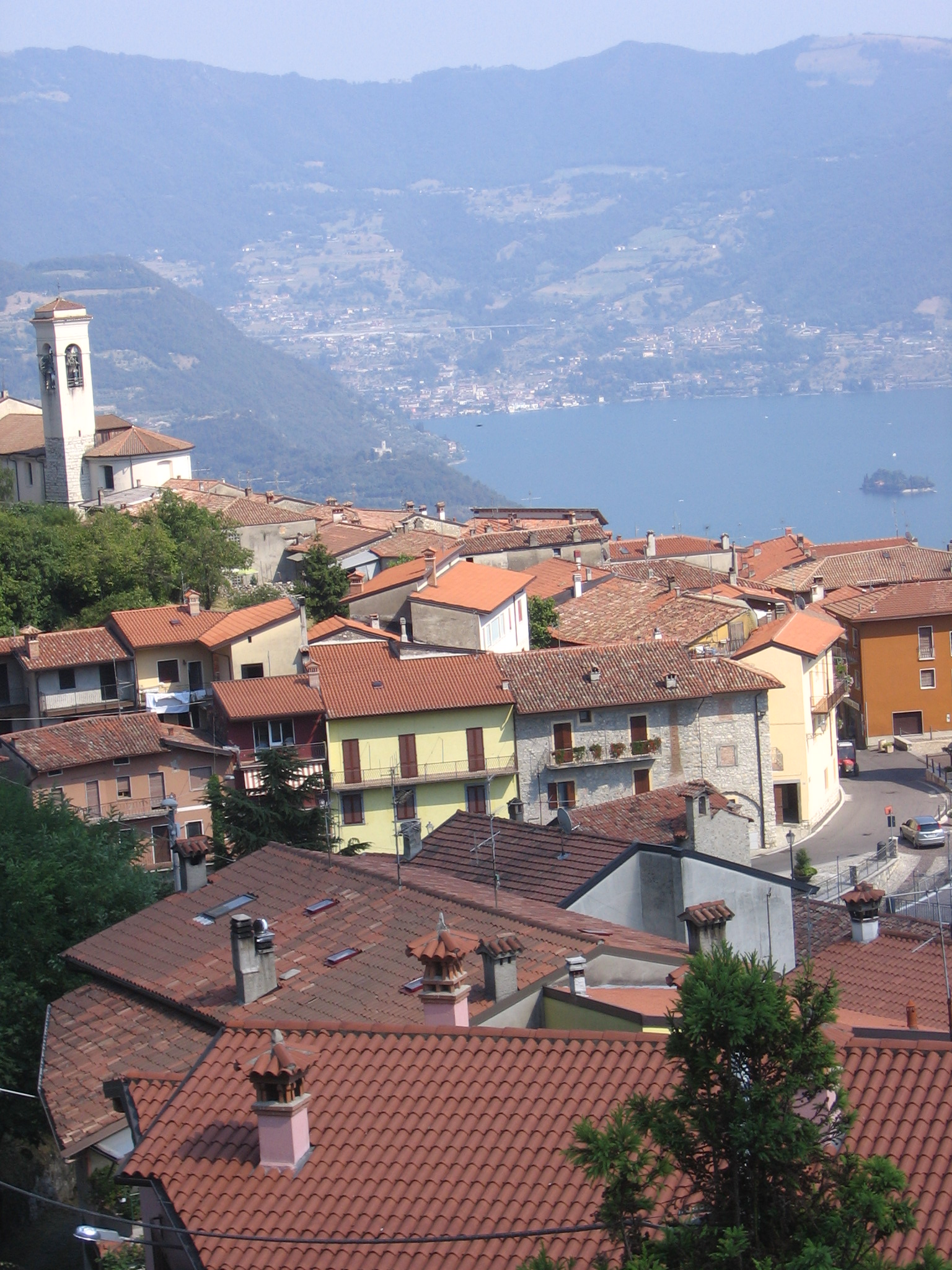
- Vigolo

- Location within Italy Location within Lombardy
- Coordinates: 45°43′N 10°1′E
- Country: Italy
- Region: Lombardy
- Province: Province of Bergamo (BG)

Government
  - Mayor: Gabriele Gori

Area
  - Total: 12.2 km^{2} (4.7 sq mi)
- Elevation: 616 m (2,021 ft)

Population (Dec. 2004)
  - Total: 641
  - Density: 52.5/km^{2} (136/sq mi)
- Demonym: Vigolesi
- Time zone: UTC+1 (CET)
  - Summer (DST): UTC+2 (CEST)
- Postal code: 24060
- Dialing code: 035

Vigolo (Bergamasque: Igol) is a comune (municipality) in the Province of Bergamo in the Italian region of Lombardy, located about 70 kilometres (43 mi) northeast of Milan and about 25 kilometres (16 mi) east of Bergamo. As of 31 December 2004, it had a population of 641 and an area of 12.2 square kilometres (4.7 mi^{2}).

Vigolo borders the following municipalities: Adrara San Martino, Adrara San Rocco, Fonteno, Parzanica, Predore, Tavernola Bergamasca, Viadanica.

== Demographic evolution ==
Historical population

Year	Pop.	±%
1861	622	—
1871	748	+20.3%
1881	790	+5.6%
1901	802	+1.5%
1911	1,003	+25.1%

Year	Pop.	±%
1921	1,036	+3.3%
1931	1,093	+5.5%
1936	1,134	+3.8%
1951	1,208	+6.5%
1961	1,036	−14.2%

Year	Pop.	±%
1971	811	−21.7%
1981	727	−10.4%
1991	656	−9.8%
2001	661	+0.8%

Source: Data from ISTAT
