= Vitalino Morandini =

Italian serial killer and mass murderer

- Born: Vitalino Morandini di Battista; 1916; Adrara San Rocco, Province of Bergamo, Kingdom of Italy
- Died: 10 June 1960 (aged 43–44); Pisa Prison, Province of Pisa, Italy
- Other names: "The Monster of Pontoglio" "Angèl"
- Conviction: Murder x9
- Penalty: Life imprisonment x4

Details
- Victims: 9–10
- Span of crimes: 1955–1956
- Country: Italy
- States: Bergamo, Brescia
- Date apprehended: 8 March 1956

Vitalino Morandini di Battista (1916 – 10 June 1960), known as The Monster of Pontoglio (Italian: Il Mostro di Pontoglio), was an Italian serial killer and mass murderer responsible for at least nine murders committed in the provinces of Bergamo and Brescia between 1955 and 1956. He was also suspected, but never charged, in the 1947 death of his aunt.

Convicted and sentenced to life for his confirmed crimes, Morandini hanged himself only two months after the conclusion of his trial.

== Early life and crimes ==
Born in 1916 in the small rural town of Adrara San Rocco, Morandini grew up in a very poor family and dropped out of school in the fourth grade to help his father in his pastoral and agricultural activities. He was nicknamed "Angèl" by locals due to his fervent religiousness.

While he was still young, Morandini's mother died, leaving him with even more work that left him with very little free time. He began stealing chickens and sheep as an outlet, but was arrested and served a month in prison. Once he was released, he continued committing petty thefts until 1938, until he was drafted into the Army, where he later fought in World War II on the Yugoslav front.

Once he returned to Italy, Morandini resumed his criminal activities and started pimping local prostitutes. In 1949, he stole a donkey, three goats, eleven sheep and more than 240,000 lire from his cousin, Giovanni Morandini, who immediately reported him to the authorities. For this, Vitalino was sentenced to six years imprisonment, which he served at the penal colony in Castiadas, Sardinia.

== Murders ==
Following his release in 1955, Morandini moved in with an aunt living in Pontoglio, but decided to kill his cousin for reporting him to the police. On 9 November of that year, he stalked Giovanni while he was out tending to his cows at a pasture, where he hit him on the back of the head with a stone. Vitalino then attempted to stage an accident by tying Giovanni's body to a cow, which he later pushed into a ravine.

Ten days later, on the night of 19–20 November, Morandini broke into a farmhouse on Squadra Street in Adrara San Martino with the intention of robbing it, but was caught in the act by the occupants. Unwilling to leave witnesses, he used an axe to bludgeon to death the three people present – 4-year-old Fausto Valtulini, his mother Angela Tiraboschi and grandmother Maria Falconi – then set the house on fire. The patriarch of the household, Giacomo Valtulini, was away tending to a stable he owned in Zandt, Bavaria, and was the only surviving member of the family.

On 28 December, Morandini broke into another house in Grone, where he used a pickaxe to kill 45-year-old Battista and 41-year-old Carolina Oberti by hitting both on the head while their five children slept. After killing the parents, Morandini did not harm the children, stole some valuables, and left.

He committed his final crime on 23 January 1956, when he decided to rob a famous tobacco shop on Piazza Armando Diaz in Pontoglio. He snuck into the house above the shop around 2:30 am, and after wrapping a stone in a pillowcase, he proceeded to attack the family inside. He fatally bludgeoned Cesare Giuseppe Breno and his wife Colomba Vignoni on the heads, after which he attacked their daughter Emilia, who was trying to get help by tapping on the window to the passers-by below. A witness later said that he saw the young woman be struck on the head with what appeared to be a stone. An autopsy later established that after killing Emilia, Morandini had sex with her corpse.

== Investigation and arrest ==
Initially, local authorities focused on a cattle thief named Vincenzo Volsi, but they turned their attention to Vitalino Morandini after receiving a tip from his aunt in which she claimed that on the night the Breno family was murdered, her nephew seemed unusually restless and agitated. His girlfriend, Franca Camanini, also reported that Morandini started exhibiting strange behavior such as growing fearful of the color red and ordering her to remove any red-colored objects from her house. A scarf found at the crime scene was established to belong to Morandini, who was arrested on 8 March.

While searching his home on Montonale Street in Pontoglio, investigators found several souvenirs taken from some of the crime scenes: these included his cousin Giovanni's umbrella; a sweater belonging to the Oberti spouses and some photos linked to the Adrara San Martino massacre. Initially, Morandini claimed that he was solely responsible for the Breno family murder, but eventually admitted guilt in the other killings as well. He was also suspected in the death of his aunt, Pasqua Elisabetta Bresciani, who died in April 1947 in what were deemed to be "suspicious circumstances", but was never charged in that case.

It was initially suspected that Morandini might have had accomplices in some of his crimes, as a witness supposedly claimed that she had seen him in the company of one or possibly two individuals on the night of the Pontoglio massacre. This claim was dismissed by investigators, who insisted that Morandini was the sole killer.

== Trial, imprisonment and suicide ==
At the subsequent trial, Morandini showed no remorse for his deeds, and when asked what it felt like to kill someone, he claimed it was like "wringing the neck of chickens". He was convicted on all counts and sentenced to four life terms, which he was ordered to serve at the Porto Azzurro prison. The two alleged accomplices in the crimes, Vincenzo Volsi and 26-year-old Felice Castoldi, were acquitted. Morandini did not react to his own sentence in any notable manner, but seemed relieved that the two men had been acquitted, after he had initially accused Castoldi of masterminding the Pontoglio murders and accusing Volsi of being his accomplice.

Four years into his sentence, he was temporarily transferred to the Pisa Prison in Pisa to await transfer to another facility. When he was left unsupervised for a brief period of time, Morandini attempted to hang himself with a towel he tied to his cell window's bars. When found, he was quickly rushed to the hospital, where doctors were shocked to learn that his heart was still beating – they then attempted to resuscitate him by doing CPR and giving him needle injections. However, Morandini died a couple of minutes later, with the autopsy determining his official cause of death to be pulmonary emphysema.

== See also ==
- List of serial killers by country

== In the media and culture ==
The Morandini case was discussed in the book "It's like wringing the necks of chickens. The ten murders of Vitalino Morandini, the 'Monster of Pontoglio" (Italian: È come tirare il collo alle galline. I dieci omicidi di Vitalino Morandini il “mostro di Pontoglio”), written by lawyer Roberto Trussardi in 2017.
