= Adrara =

Adrara may refer to the following places in the province of Bergamo, Italy:

- Adrara San Martino
- Adrara San Rocco
