= Parzanica =

- Comune
- Comune di Parzanica
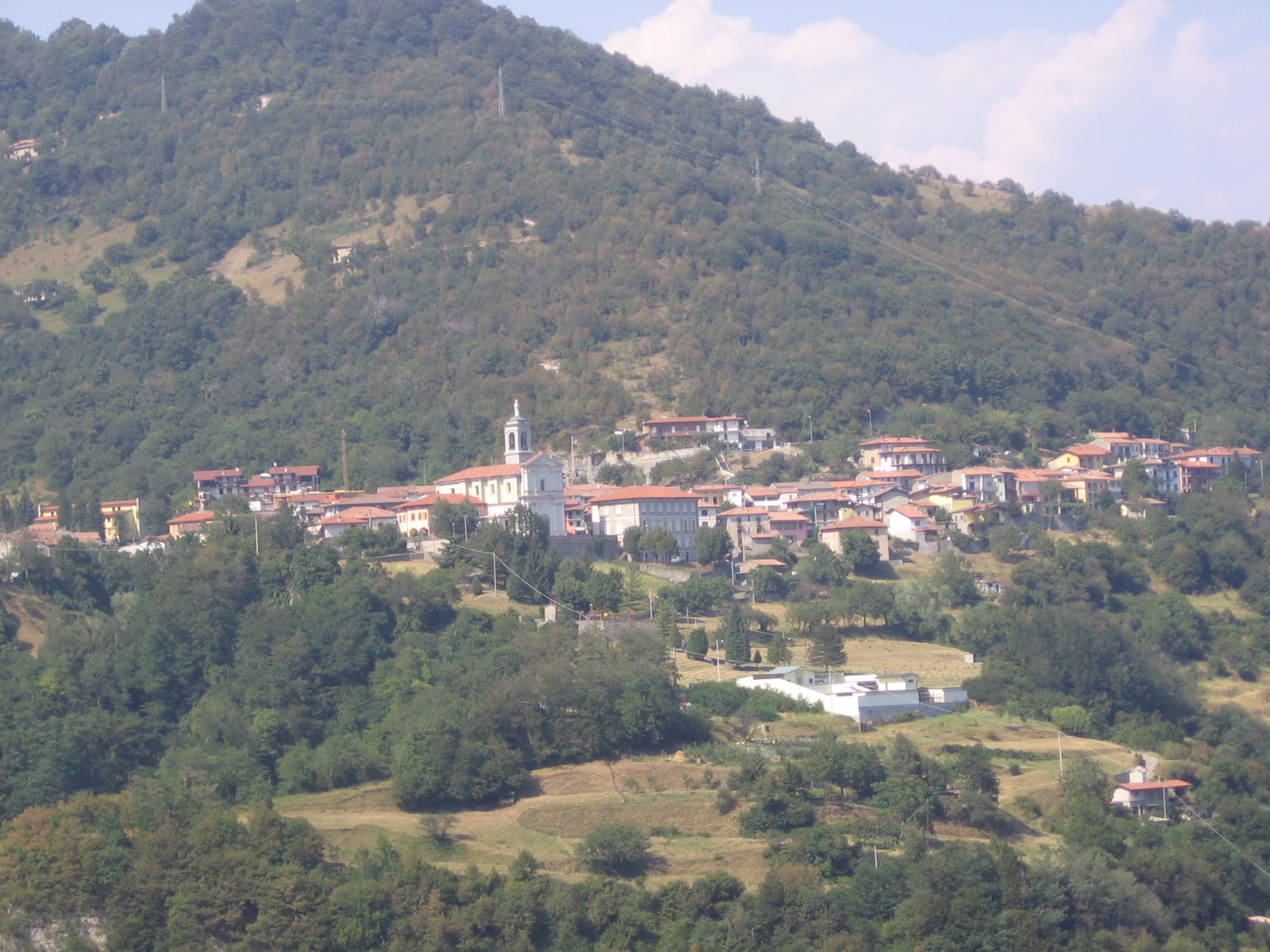
- Parzanica

- Location within Italy Location within Lombardy
- Coordinates: 45°44′N 10°2′E
- Country: Italy
- Region: Lombardy
- Province: Province of Bergamo (BG)

Area
  - Total: 10.8 km^{2} (4.2 sq mi)
- Elevation: 753 m (2,470 ft)

Population (Dec. 2004)
  - Total: 365
  - Density: 33.8/km^{2} (87.5/sq mi)
- Demonym: Parzanicensi
- Time zone: UTC+1 (CET)
  - Summer (DST): UTC+2 (CEST)
- Postal code: 24060
- Dialing code: 035

Parzanica (Bergamasque: Parsanèga) is a comune (municipality) in the Province of Bergamo in the Italian region of Lombardy, located about 70 kilometres (43 mi) northeast of Milan and about 30 kilometres (19 mi) east of Bergamo. As of 31 December 2004, it had a population of 365 and an area of 10.8 square kilometres (4.2 mi^{2}).

Parzanica borders the following municipalities: Fonteno, Marone, Monte Isola, Riva di Solto, Tavernola Bergamasca, Vigolo.

== Demographic evolution ==
Historical population

Year	Pop.	±%
1861	529	—
1871	564	+6.6%
1881	558	−1.1%
1901	673	+20.6%
1911	775	+15.2%

Year	Pop.	±%
1921	866	+11.7%
1931	942	+8.8%
1936	979	+3.9%
1951	1,098	+12.2%
1961	1,027	−6.5%

Year	Pop.	±%
1971	723	−29.6%
1981	567	−21.6%
1991	424	−25.2%
2001	377	−11.1%

Source: Data from ISTAT
