= Berzo Inferiore =

Berzo Inferiore Bèrs
- Comune
- Comune di Berzo Inferiore
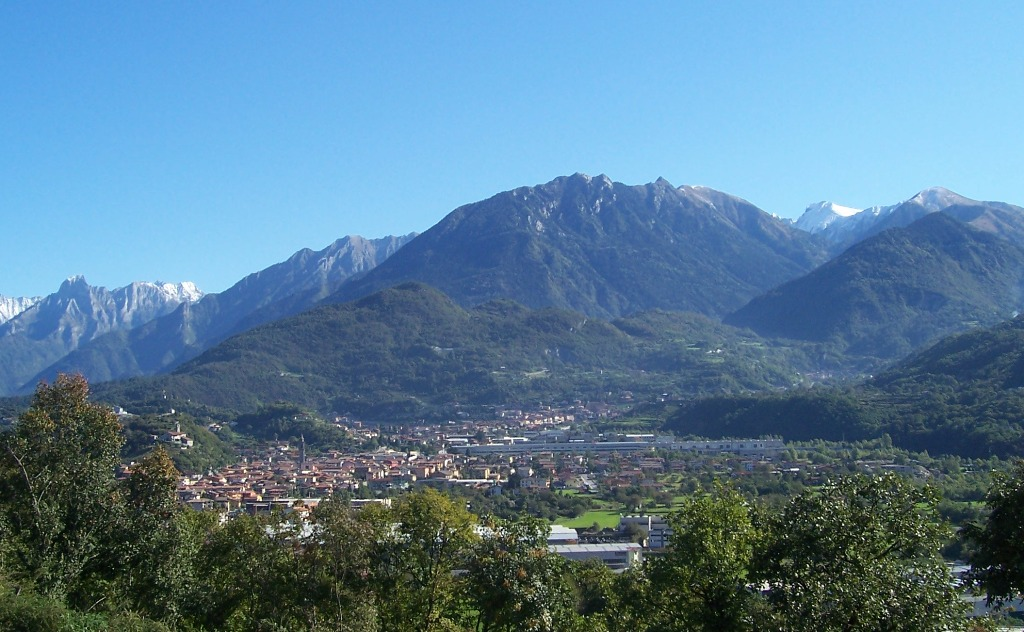
- View of Berzo Inferiore and Bienno

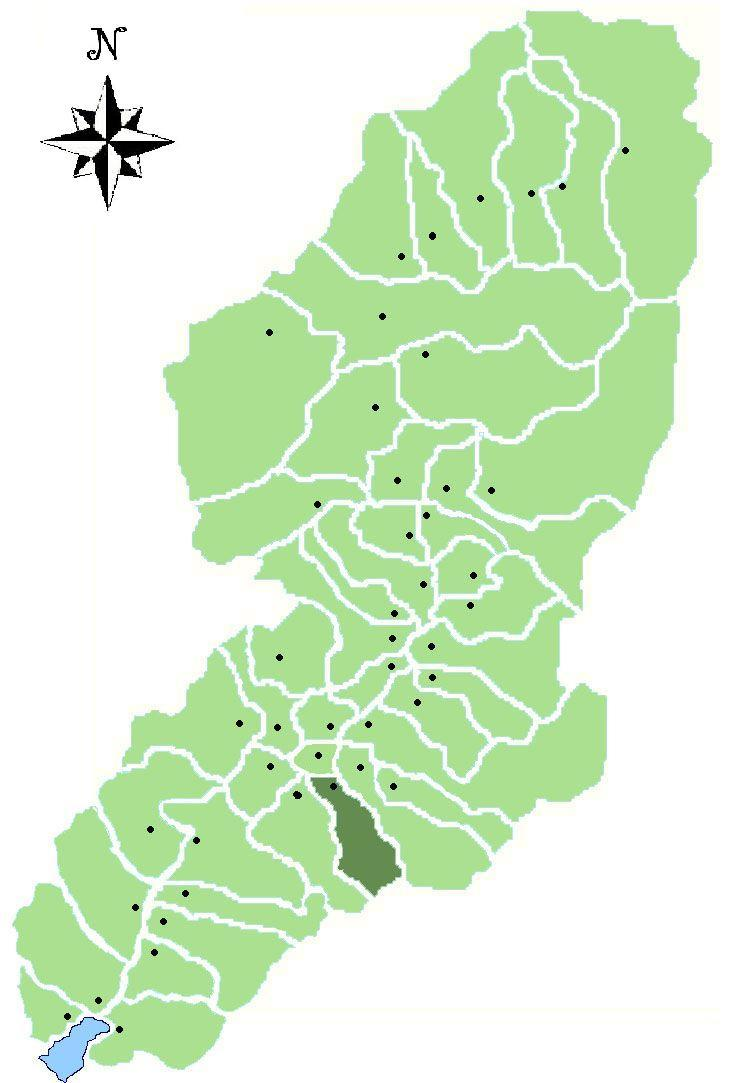

- Location within Italy Location within Lombardy
- Coordinates: 45°55′54″N 10°16′50″E
- Country: Italy
- Region: Lombardy
- Province: Brescia (BS)

Government
  - Mayor: Ruggero Bontempi

Area
  - Total: 21 km^{2} (8.1 sq mi)
- Elevation: 356 m (1,168 ft)

Population (30 April 2017)
  - Total: 2,454
  - Density: 120/km^{2} (300/sq mi)
- Time zone: UTC+1 (CET)
  - Summer (DST): UTC+2 (CEST)
- Postal code: 25040
- Dialing code: 0364
- Patron saint: Innocenzo of Berzo, Madonna Pellegrina, St. Lawrence
- Saint day: 3 March, 24 September, 10 August
- Website: Official website

Berzo Inferiore (Camunian: Bèrs) is an Italian comune of 2,316 inhabitants in Val Camonica, province of Brescia, in Lombardy, northern Italy.

== Geography ==
The village of Berzo Inferiore (Inferiore means "at the bottom" to distinguish from Berzo Demo) is situated in Val Grigna, a side valley of the Oglio valley, upstream from Esine and downstream from Bienno.

== History ==
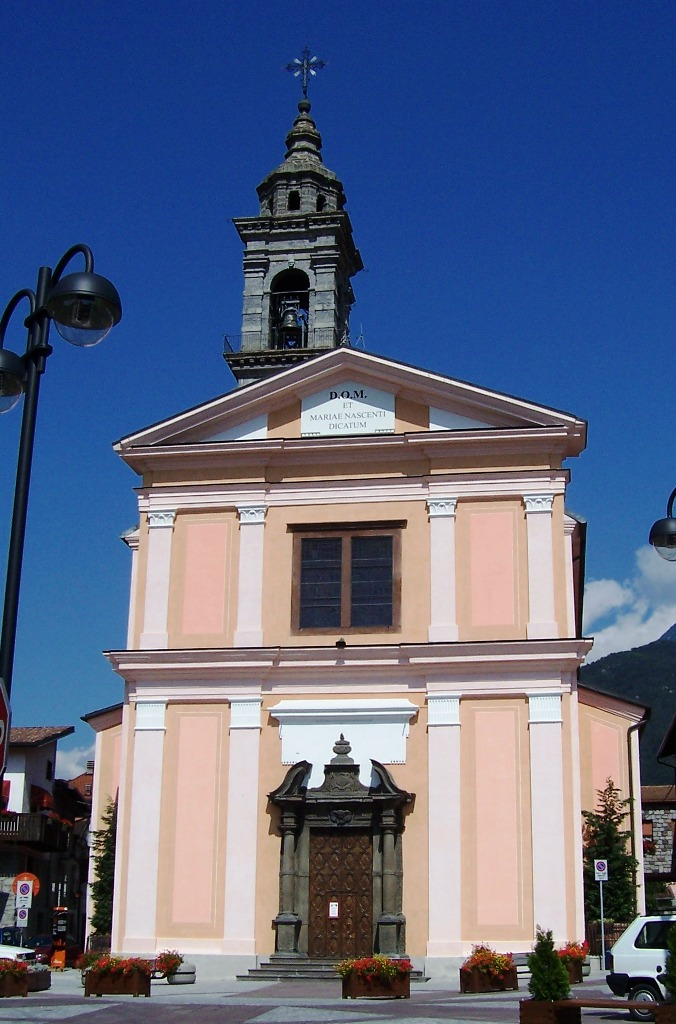
Parish of St Maria

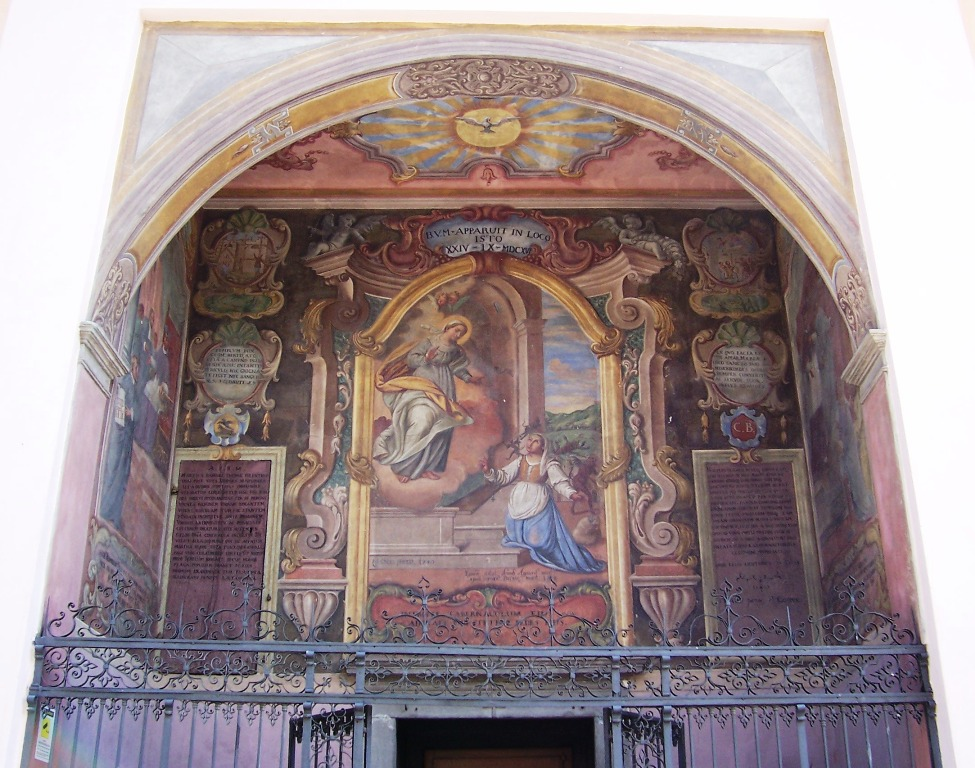
Apparition of Maria in Berzo Inferiore (1618)-

The area has known habitation dating back to Mesolithic prehistory, as ascribed from artifacts found near Passo Crestoso. The first documentation of the town name is in a document from 1041, that mentions Bercio. Documents also cite a quarrel with the nearby town of Bovegno regarding pastoral lands. In 1350, the bishop of Brescia, Zanino Federici of Gorzone, asserted feudal rights for the territories of the Lower Berzo, Ono and Cricolo and Cerveno of Rainaldo.

In July 1404, the town of Berzo was destroyed by the Guelphs from the towns of Predore and Adrara San Rocco, which had suffered depredations and looting at the hands of townsmen of Berzo. In 1562, the priest Giacomo Pandolfi was sent by the Bishop of Brescia, Domenico Bollani, to Berzo; his mission was to urge the local authorities to censure and cease the frequent episodes of public dancing in the town.

A miraculous apparition of the Virgin Mary to Marta Polentini is said to have occurred in 1618.

In 1867, the provincial council of Brescia agreed to the union of municipalities and Bienno Berzo: this was not carried out due to popular opposition. Between 1927 and 1947, due to fascist laws on municipalities, the municipalities of Bienno Berzo were aggregated.

== Main sights ==
The churches of Berzo Inferiore are:

- Shrine of Our Lady parish church, erected at the 1609th It has a tower of 55 meters and a portal "stone of Sarnico". Inside, the altarpiece of Fiammenghino.
- Church of San Lorenzo, fifteenth century church with frescoes by Giovanni Pietro da Cemmo
- Church of San Glisente, is on top of the mountain the same name, retains a crypt of the sixteenth century.

== Culture ==
The scütüm are in camunian dialect nicknames, sometimes personal, elsewhere showing the characteristic features of a community. The one which characterize the people of Berzo Inferiore is Gòs or Farisé.

== People ==
- Innocenzo da Berzo

== Sources ==
- Panazza, Gaetano; Araldo Bertolini (1984). Arte in Val Camonica - vol 4 (in Italian). Brescia: Industrie grafiche bresciane.
