= Fonteno =

- Comune
- Comune di Fonteno
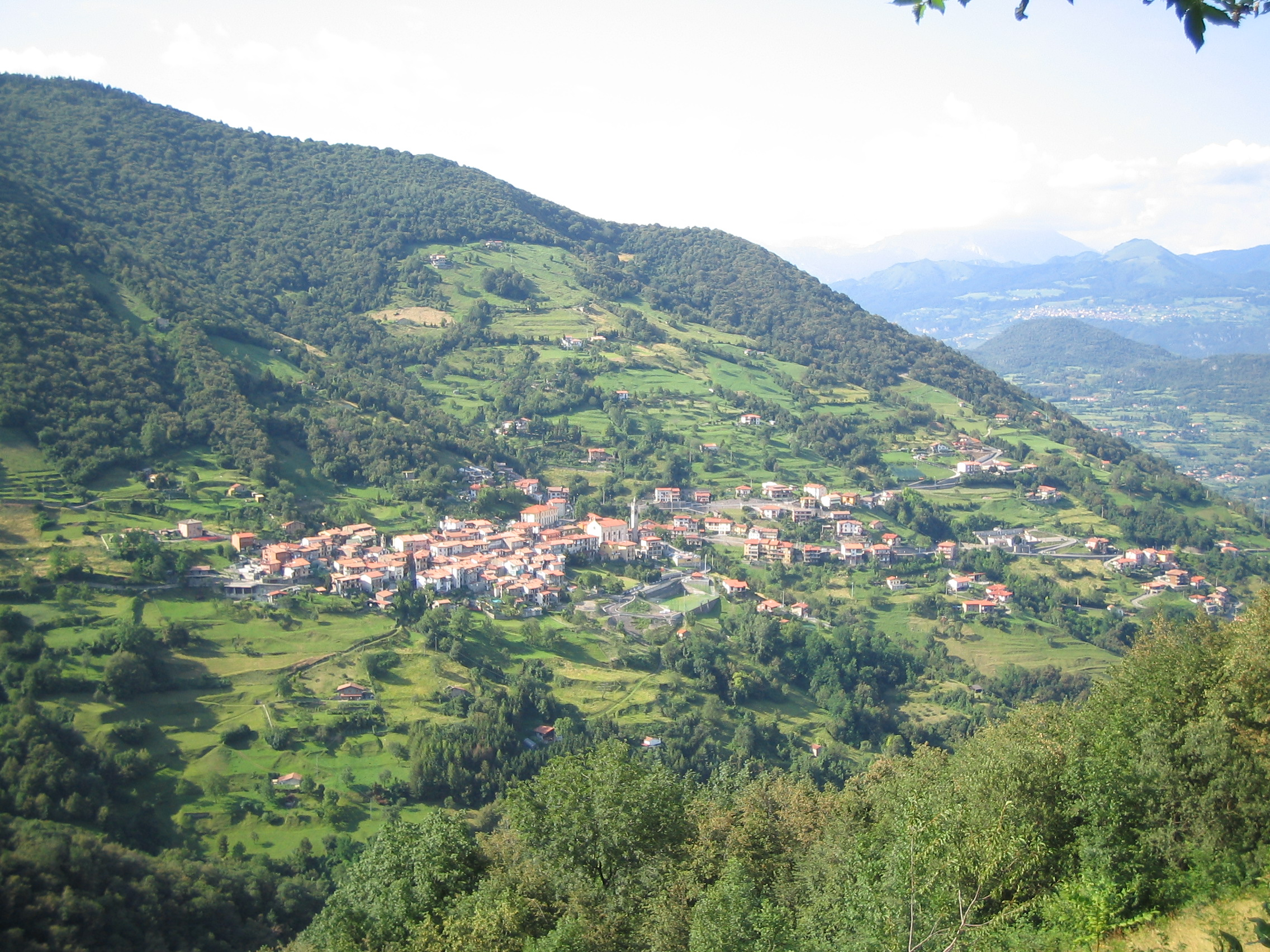
- Fonteno

- Location within Italy Location within Lombardy
- Coordinates: 45°46′N 10°1′E
- Country: Italy
- Region: Lombardy
- Province: Province of Bergamo (BG)
- Frazioni: Xino

Area
  - Total: 11.1 km^{2} (4.3 sq mi)
- Elevation: 606 m (1,988 ft)

Population (Dec. 2004)
  - Total: 680
  - Density: 61/km^{2} (160/sq mi)
- Demonym: Fontenesi
- Time zone: UTC+1 (CET)
  - Summer (DST): UTC+2 (CEST)
- Postal code: 24060
- Dialing code: 035

Fonteno (Bergamasque: Fonté) is a comune (municipality) in the Province of Bergamo in the Italian region of Lombardy, located about 70 kilometres (43 mi) northeast of Milan and about 30 kilometres (19 mi) northeast of Bergamo. As of 31 December 2004, it had a population of 680 and an area of 11.1 square kilometres (4.3 mi^{2}).

The municipality of Fonteno contains the frazione (subdivision) Xino.

Fonteno borders the following municipalities: Adrara San Rocco, Endine Gaiano, Monasterolo del Castello, Parzanica, Riva di Solto, Solto Collina, Vigolo.

== Demographic evolution ==
Historical population

Year	Pop.	±%
1861	456	—
1871	436	−4.4%
1881	424	−2.8%
1901	586	+38.2%
1911	670	+14.3%

Year	Pop.	±%
1921	748	+11.6%
1931	775	+3.6%
1936	835	+7.7%
1951	949	+13.7%
1961	886	−6.6%

Year	Pop.	±%
1971	764	−13.8%
1981	677	−11.4%
1991	724	+6.9%
2001	697	−3.7%

Source: Data from ISTAT
