= Giacomo Rossetti =

Italian painter and photographer

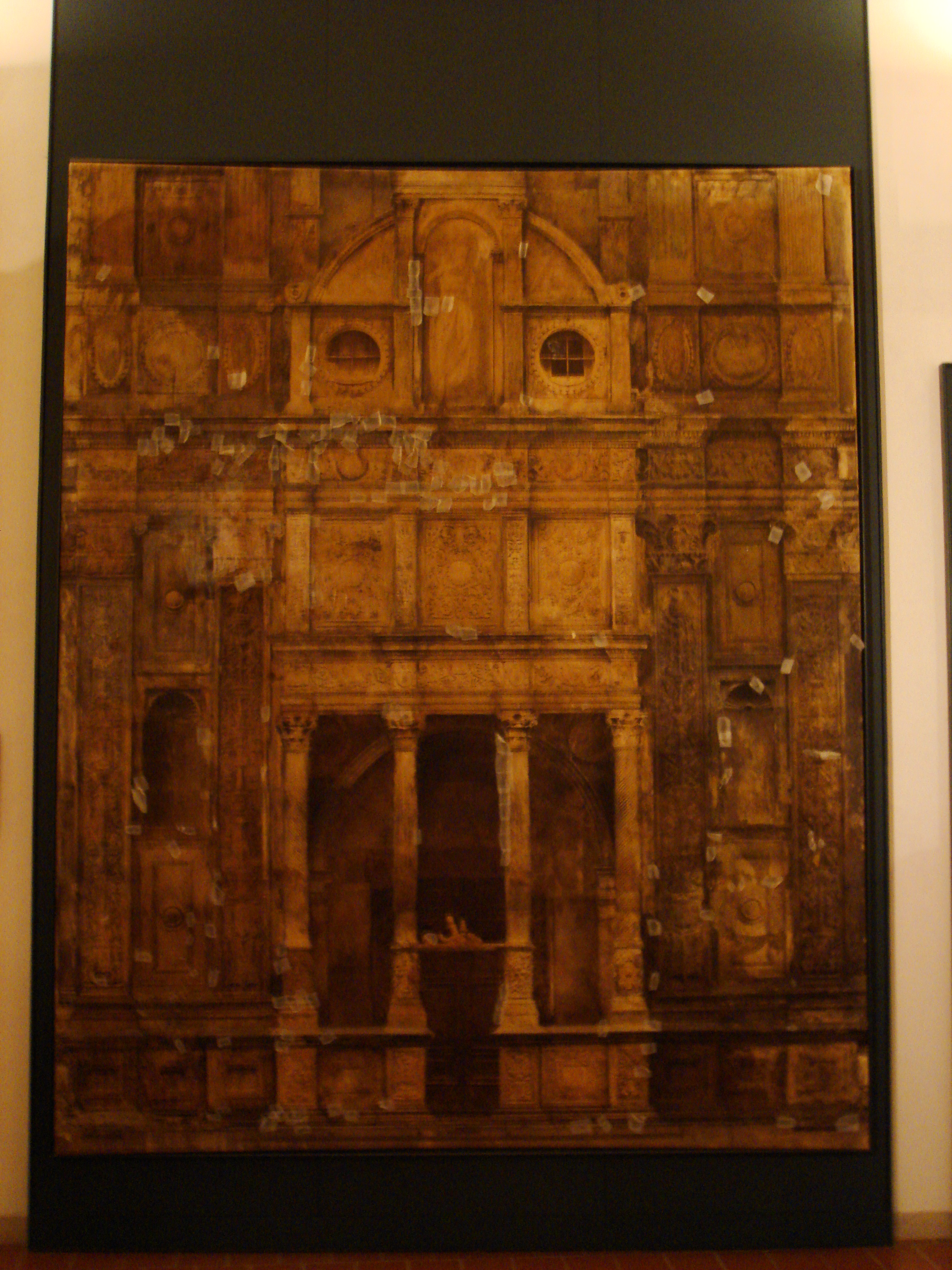
Chiesa di Santa Maria dei Miracoli in Musei Civici di Arte e Storia di Brescia. Vienna exhibition 1873. 3 x 2.5 metres.

Giacomo Rossetti (Marone, 1807 - Brescia, 1882) was an Italian painter and photographer. He studied at the academy Carrara di Bergamo. He became prominent after making a famous portrait of Garibaldi, and later became a passionate photographer developing photography the rest of his life.

== Photography ==
He opened his photographic studio in Brescia in Corso Magenta St. in 1851 along with the photographer, and also painter, Jose Alegri.

In the Palazzo Bargnani (then the headquarters of IR High School-Gymnasium), Rossetti exhibited his first photographic portraits that were admired for their quality and also its large size. Lately, he opened on his own a "Photo Studio" in Corso Magenta No 638.

With the help of the engineer Valery Louis, produces several architectural photographs. At this time Rossetti made photo albums of Church of Santa Maria dei Miracoli and the Palazzo della Loggia.

Rossetti held an exhibition at the Athenaeum of Brescia in 1862. His photographs, albumin sepia tones, of monuments of the city were quickly appreciated. To facilitate the work of art students, he made twenty-five photographs of different parts of the Loggia and Monte di Pieta Vecchio. These photos were arranged in different sizes, on cardboards, to replace the plaster molds used in drawing classes.

He became Honorary Member of the Athenaeum of Brescia since 1878.

Giacomo Rossetti gave two of his albums to the Ateneo of Brescia as a gift:

- Illustrazione the Palazzo Municipale di Brescia detto the Loggia, in 48 folio tavole fotografiche (Brescia sd).
- All'Ateneo Dono di due grandi albums Photographers, illustranti il Palazzo Municipale and S. Maria dei Miracoli (In, "Comm. Ateneo di Brescia" 1878: 55).

In the Vienna exhibition of 1873 Rossetti presented a serie of photos of architecture including a giant photograph of 3 x 2.5 meters, which impressed because of its size called "Chiesa dei Miracoli facciata Brescia". He won the medal of merit in this exhibition. This picture is currently held in the Musei Civici di Arte e Storia di Brescia. His work was admired by the Emperor Francis Joseph.

== Exhibitions ==
He participated successfully in the following exhibitions:

- Exhibition of Philadelphia (1876)
- Paris Exposition (1878)
- The Melbourne Exhibition (1880) where he was awarded the gold medal.
- Exposure Photographic Art in Milan (1881)
- Vienna exhibition (1873)
- Exhibition "Vu d'Italie 1841-1941, La Photographie dans les collections du italienne Alinari Museum". Paris, 2005

== Holders ==
- Canadian Centre for Architecture:
  - Giacomo Rossetti, photographs, Canadian Centre for Architecture (digitized items)
  - They also own the album “Saint Mary of Miracles and the municipal palace”, Brescia, Italy
- Alinari Museum
  - The facade of Monte Vecchio
  - Twin portal with sculptured decorations of the Church of S. Maria del Carmine
- Bibliothèque nationale de France
  - Palais municipal de Brescia
  - Loggia de l'église Sainte-Marie-des-Miracles
