= Berzo =

Berzo may refer to the following communes in Italy:

- Berzo Demo, in the province of Brescia
- Berzo Inferiore, in the province of Brescia
- Berzo San Fermo, in the province of Bergamo
