= Viadanica =

- Comune
- Comune di Viadanica
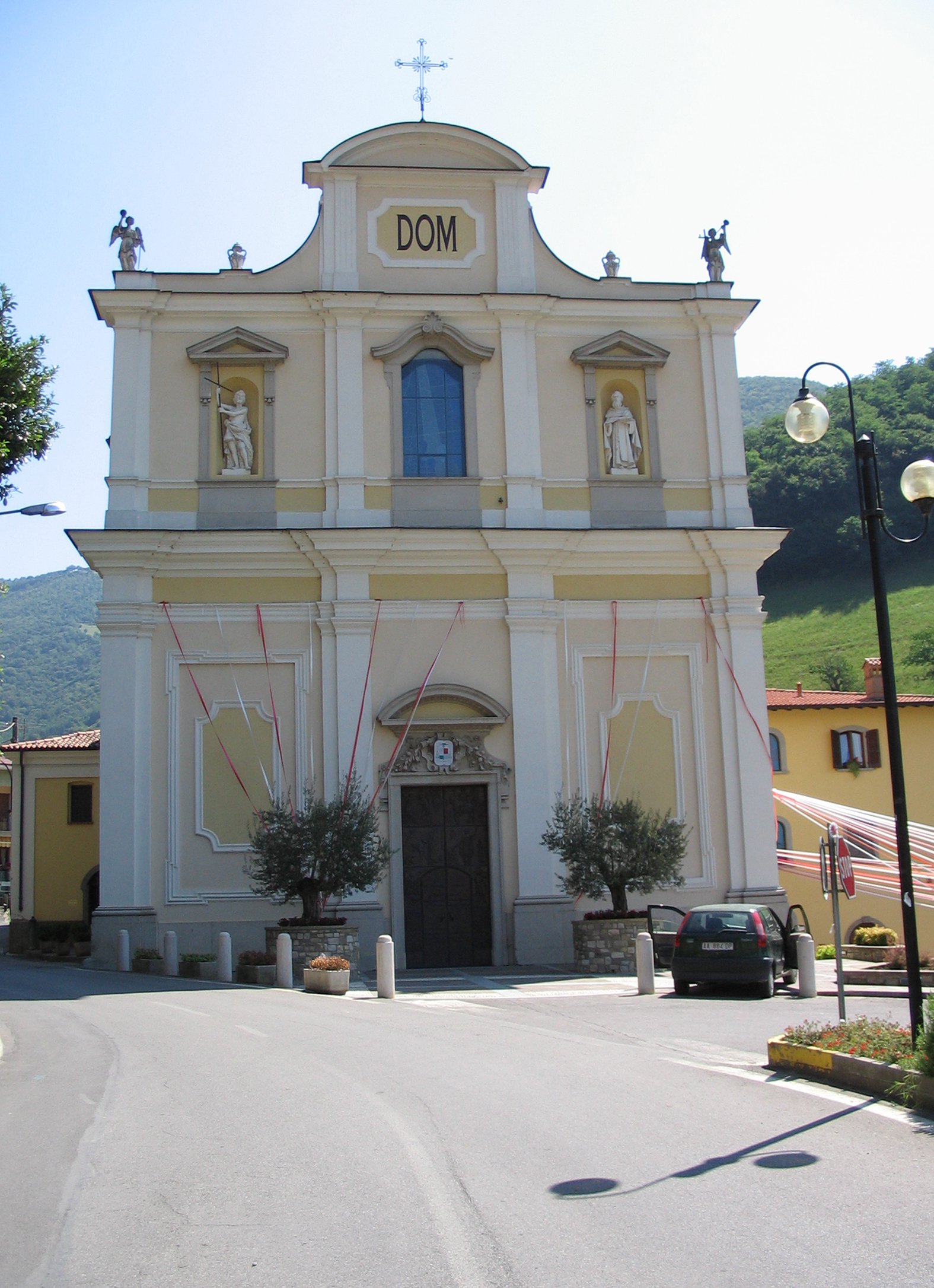
- Church

- Location within Italy Location within Lombardy
- Coordinates: 45°41′N 9°58′E
- Country: Italy
- Region: Lombardy
- Province: Province of Bergamo (BG)

Area
  - Total: 5.4 km^{2} (2.1 sq mi)
- Elevation: 336 m (1,102 ft)

Population (Dec. 2004)
  - Total: 1,093
  - Density: 200/km^{2} (520/sq mi)
- Demonym: Viadanichesi
- Time zone: UTC+1 (CET)
  - Summer (DST): UTC+2 (CEST)
- Postal code: 24060
- Dialing code: 035

Viadanica (Bergamasque: Idànga) is a comune (municipality) in the Province of Bergamo in the Italian region of Lombardy, located about 70 kilometres (43 mi) northeast of Milan and about 25 kilometres (16 mi) east of Bergamo. As of 31 December 2004, it had a population of 1,093 and an area of 5.4 square kilometres (2.1 mi^{2}).

Viadanica borders the following municipalities: Adrara San Martino, Predore, Sarnico, Vigolo.

== Demographic evolution ==
Historical population

| Year | Pop. | ±% |
|---|---|---|
| 1861 | 688 | — |
| 1871 | 754 | +9.6% |
| 1881 | 724 | −4.0% |
| 1901 | 815 | +12.6% |
| 1911 | 912 | +11.9% |

| Year | Pop. | ±% |
|---|---|---|
| 1921 | 943 | +3.4% |
| 1931 | 984 | +4.3% |
| 1936 | 1,017 | +3.4% |
| 1951 | 974 | −4.2% |
| 1961 | 920 | −5.5% |

| Year | Pop. | ±% |
|---|---|---|
| 1971 | 895 | −2.7% |
| 1981 | 886 | −1.0% |
| 1991 | 937 | +5.8% |
| 2001 | 1,028 | +9.7% |

Source: Data from ISTAT
