= Sarnico =

- Comune
- Comune di Sarnico
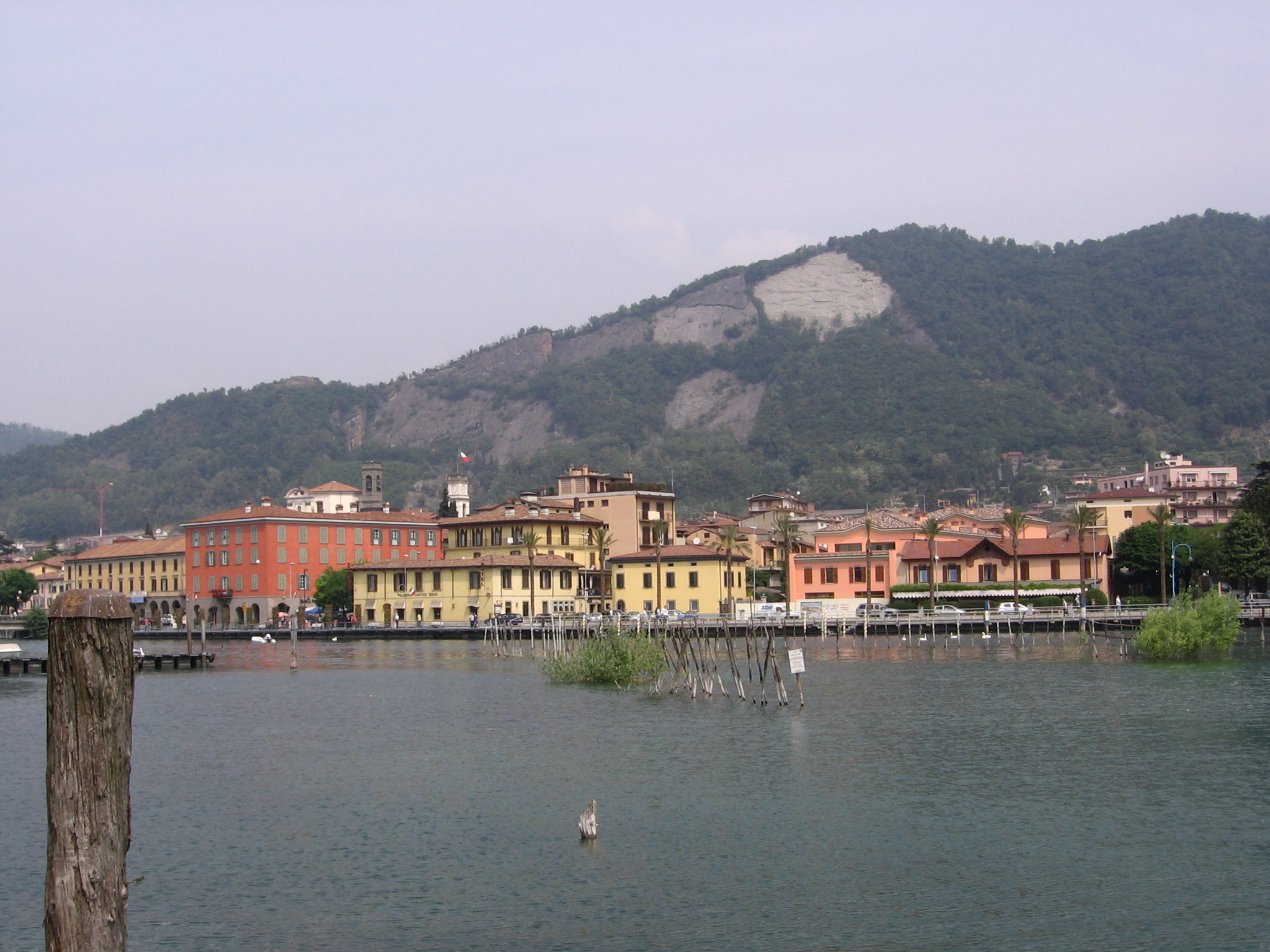
- Sarnico

- Location within Italy Location within Lombardy
- Coordinates: 45°40′N 9°57′E
- Country: Italy
- Region: Lombardy
- Province: Bergamo (BG)

Government
  - Mayor: Giorgio Bertazzoli

Area
  - Total: 6.66 km^{2} (2.57 sq mi)
- Elevation: 197 m (646 ft)

Population (30 November 2014)
  - Total: 6,631
  - Density: 996/km^{2} (2,580/sq mi)
- Demonym: Sarnicesi
- Time zone: UTC+1 (CET)
  - Summer (DST): UTC+2 (CEST)
- Postal code: 24067
- Dialing code: 035
- Patron saint: St. Martin
- Website: Official website

Sarnico (Bergamasque: Sàrnech) is a comune (municipality) in the Province of Bergamo in the Italian region of Lombardy, about 70 kilometres (43 mi) northeast of Milan and about 20 kilometres (12 mi) east of Bergamo at the southern end of Lake Iseo.

Sarnico borders the following municipalities: Adrara San Martino, Iseo, Paratico, Predore, Viadanica, and Villongo.

== Twin towns ==
Sarnico is twinned with:

- Plan-de-Cuques, France
