= Riva di Solto =

- Comune
- Comune di Riva di Solto
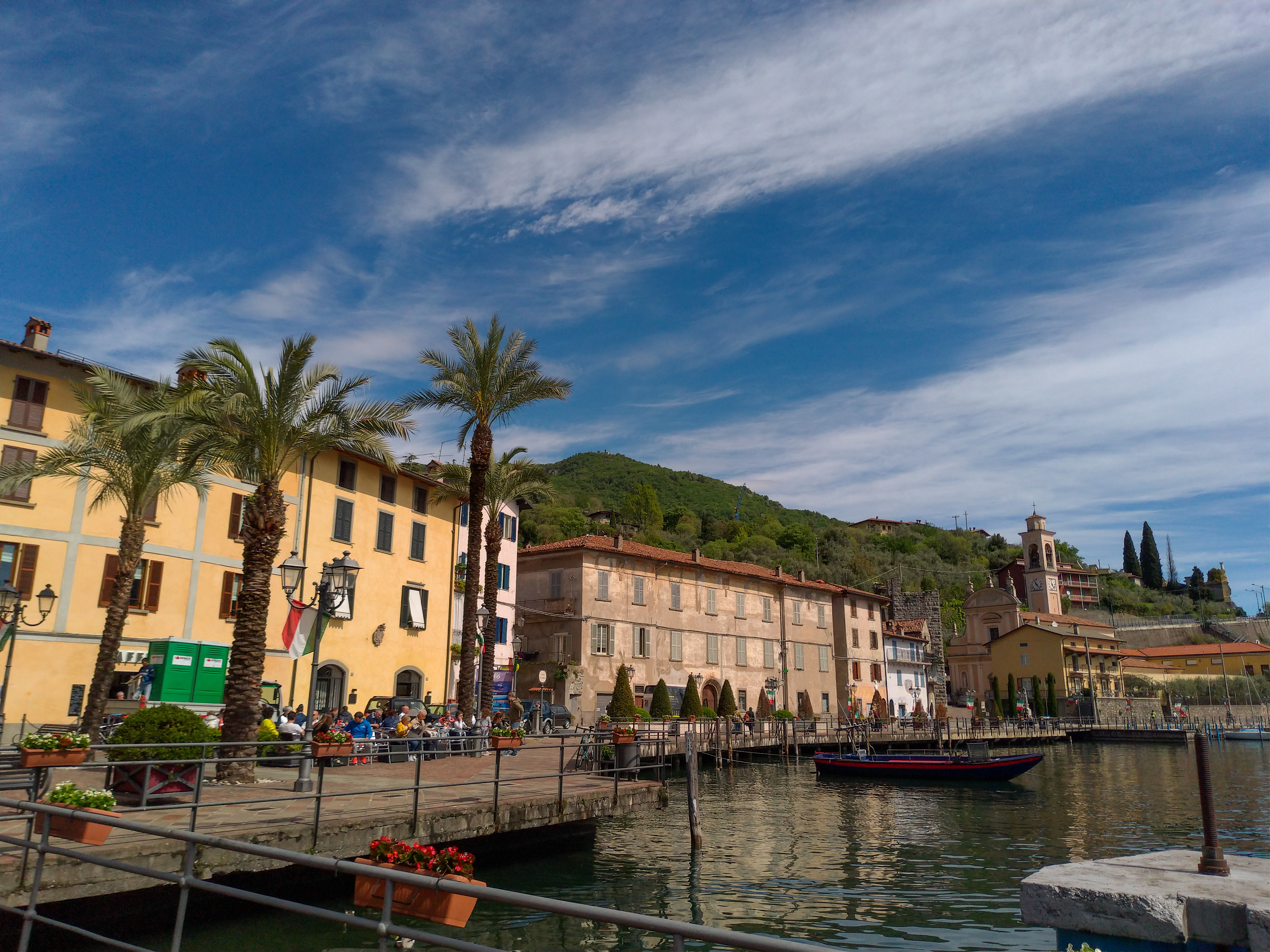
- Riva di Solto

- Coat of arms

- Location within Italy Location within Lombardy
- Coordinates: 45°46′N 10°2′E
- Country: Italy
- Region: Lombardy
- Province: Bergamo (BG)
- Frazioni: Gargarino, Zorzino, Zu

Government
  - Mayor: Norma Polini

Area
  - Total: 8.6 km^{2} (3.3 sq mi)
- Elevation: 186 m (610 ft)

Population (Dec. 2004)
  - Total: 838
  - Density: 97/km^{2} (250/sq mi)
- Demonym: Rivolesi
- Time zone: UTC+1 (CET)
  - Summer (DST): UTC+2 (CEST)
- Postal code: 24060
- Dialing code: 035

Riva di Solto (Bergamasque: Rìa de Sólt) is a comune (municipality) in the Province of Bergamo in the Italian region of Lombardy, located about 80 kilometres (50 mi) northeast of Milan and about 30 kilometres (19 mi) east of Bergamo, on the western shore of the Lake Iseo.

Riva di Solto borders the following municipalities: Fonteno, Marone, Parzanica, Pisogne, Solto Collina.

== Demographic evolution ==
Historical population

Year	Pop.	±%
1861	788	—
1871	851	+8.0%
1881	877	+3.1%
1901	888	+1.3%
1911	997	+12.3%

Year	Pop.	±%
1921	1,078	+8.1%
1931	1,039	−3.6%
1936	997	−4.0%
1951	1,075	+7.8%
1961	979	−8.9%

Year	Pop.	±%
1971	847	−13.5%
1981	895	+5.7%
1991	858	−4.1%
2001	833	−2.9%

Source: Data from ISTAT
