= Tavernola Bergamasca =

- Comune
- Comune di Tavernola Bergamasca
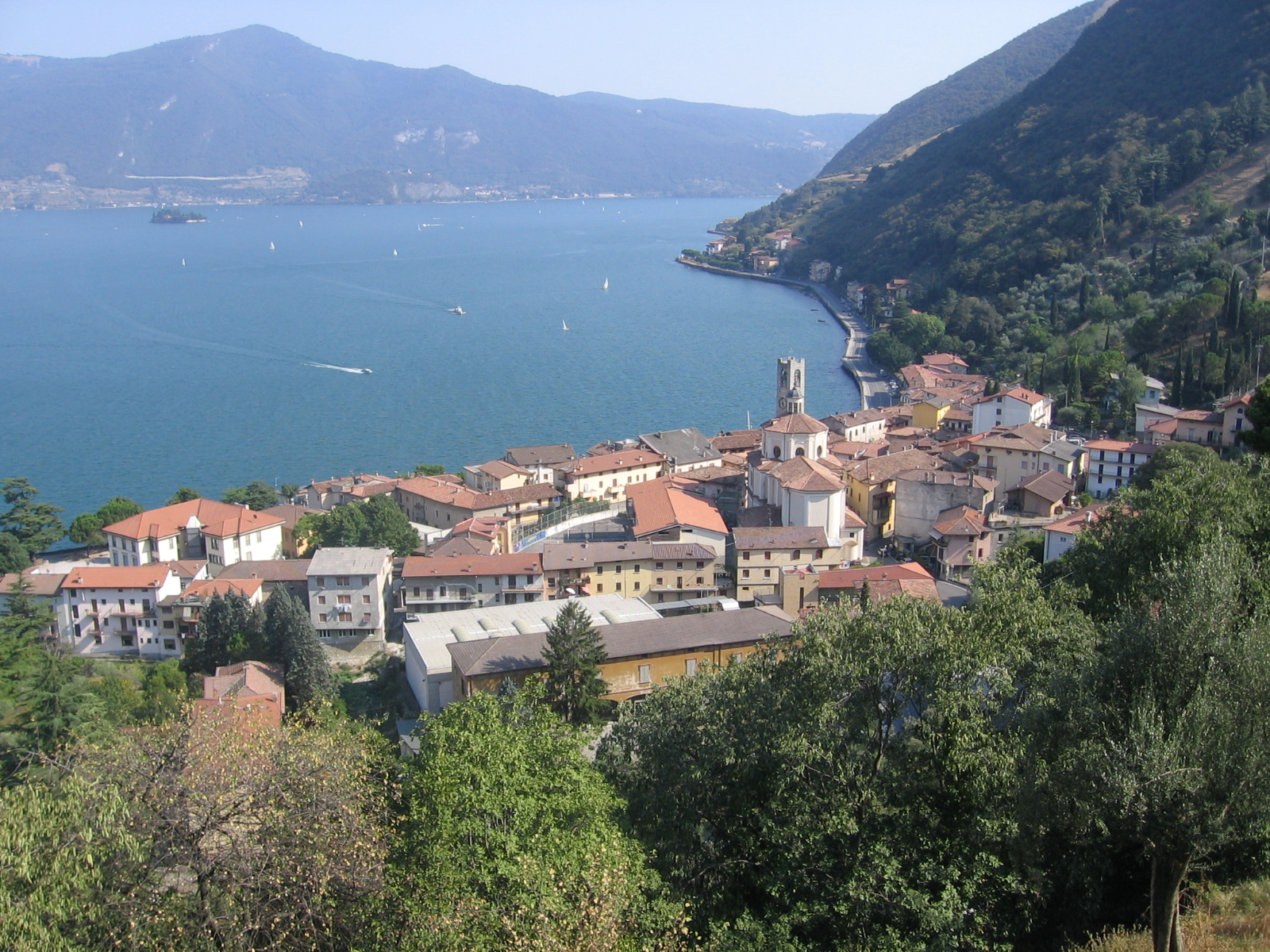
- Tavernola Bergamasca

- Location within Italy Location within Lombardy
- Coordinates: 45°43′N 10°3′E
- Country: Italy
- Region: Lombardy
- Province: Province of Bergamo (BG)

Area
  - Total: 12.4 km^{2} (4.8 sq mi)
- Elevation: 191 m (627 ft)

Population (Dec. 2004)
  - Total: 2,242
  - Density: 181/km^{2} (468/sq mi)
- Demonym: Tavernolesi
- Time zone: UTC+1 (CET)
  - Summer (DST): UTC+2 (CEST)
- Postal code: 24060
- Dialing code: 035

Tavernola Bergamasca (Bergamasque: Taèrnola) is a comune (municipality) in the Province of Bergamo in the Italian region of Lombardy, located about 70 kilometres (43 mi) northeast of Milan and about 30 kilometres (19 mi) east of Bergamo. As of 31 December 2004, it had a population of 2,242 and an area of 12.4 square kilometres (4.8 mi^{2}).

Tavernola Bergamasca borders the following municipalities: Iseo, Monte Isola, Parzanica, Predore, Vigolo.

== Demographic evolution ==
Historical population

Year	Pop.	±%
1861	733	—
1871	716	−2.3%
1881	778	+8.7%
1901	1,002	+28.8%
1911	1,160	+15.8%

Year	Pop.	±%
1921	1,406	+21.2%
1931	1,691	+20.3%
1936	1,827	+8.0%
1951	2,102	+15.1%
1961	2,287	+8.8%

Year	Pop.	±%
1971	2,286	−0.0%
1981	2,328	+1.8%
1991	2,360	+1.4%
2001	2,273	−3.7%

Source: Data from ISTAT
