= Innocenzo da Berzo =

Italian Roman Catholic priest

Blessed Innocenzo da Berzo OFMCap
- Blessed Innocenzo da Berzo

Priest
- Born: 19 March 1844; Niardo, Kingdom of Lombardy–Venetia, Austria
- Died: 3 March 1890 (aged 45); Bergamo, Kingdom of Italy
- Venerated in: Roman Catholic Church
- Beatified: 12 November 1961, Saint Peter's Basilica, Vatican City by Pope John XXIII
- Feast: 28 September
- Attributes: Capuchin habit
- Patronage: Berzo; Children

Innocenzo da Berzo (19 March 1844 - 3 March 1890), born Giovanni Scalvinoni, was an Italian religious priest of the Capuchins. Scalvinoni assumed the religious name Innocenzo upon his investiture as a Capuchin friar. Pope John XXIII beatified him on 12 November 1961.

== Life ==
Giovanni Scalvinoni was born on 19 March 1844 to farm-workers Pietro Scalvinoni and Francesca Poli in Niardo, (Brescia). He was baptized Giovanni. His father died of pneumonia when Giovanni was three months old in June 1844. He spent his childhood in Berzo.

As a small child he had great mercy for the poor, giving generously to those who asked, even though his family was in need. In 1861 his uncle Francesco sent him to the municipal college in Lovere in the province of Bergamo and he passed with high marks. In 1864 he entered the diocesan seminary of Brescia. He was ordained to the priesthood on 2 June 1867 and served, among others, as vice-chancellor of the seminary, but each time he was removed because his innate shyness made it difficult to impose authority. He was assigned as the parochial vicar at the parish of Cevo in Valsaviore. In 1870 he returned to Berzo Inferiore where his duties were to act as a confessor and to direct the local primary school.

During the time in the parish he found a need for solitude, prayer and penance. In 1874 he entered the Annunciata convent in the village of Borno. In 1878 he made his solemn vows. He spent a year in Albino. Except for short assignments of preaching spiritual exercises in some convents in Lombardy, he remained at the Annunicata convent. There he lived a life of intense abandonment, living the adage of "do good and disappear". He had a deep devotion to the Blessed Sacrament, finding his sustenance in front of the tabernacle. He also had a devotion to the crucified Jesus Christ, and encouraged penitents to the exercise of the Way of the Cross.

On 3 March 1890 he died in the infirmary of the convent of the Capuchin friars in Bergamo. From 26 to 28 September of the same year his remains were transferred to the cemetery of Berzo Inferiore in a trip defined as "the last itinerant adventure connected to the earthly world of the little friar from Berzo". The mortal remains of Innocenzo from Berzo arrived in Vallecamonica some months after his death. Even though the news went slower than now, a great number of people asked the conventual house, where his body was resting, to have a secondary relic of his mortal remains. His remains are preserved in the Marian basilica of Santa Maria Nascente in Berzo Inferiore.

== Beatification ==
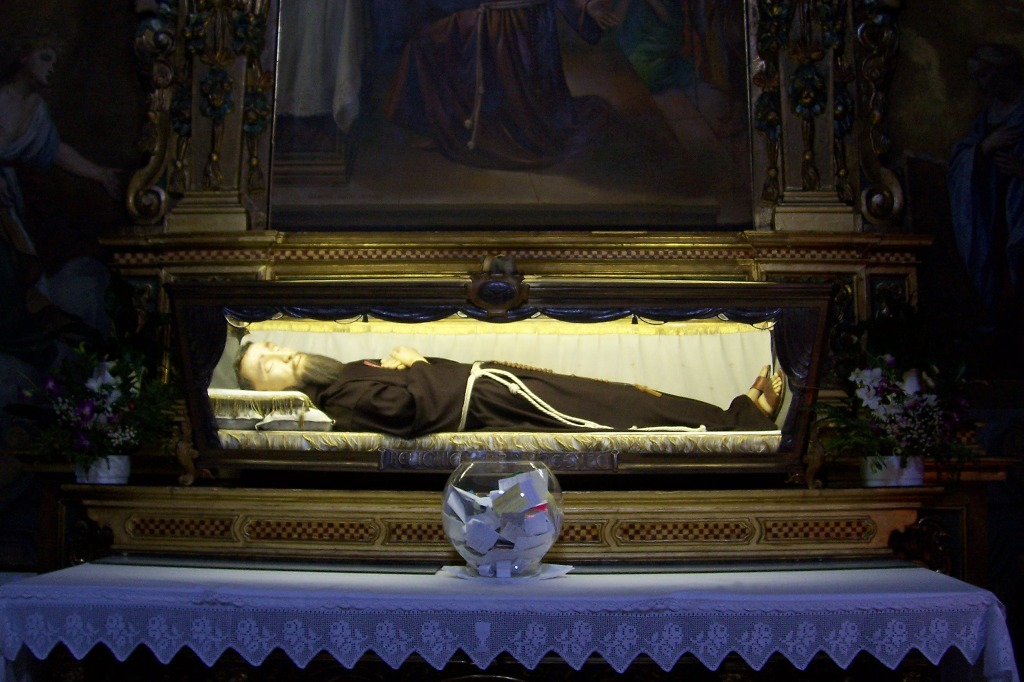
Tomb.

He is held in high esteem in the Valcamonica region of Lombardy. There are two miracles attributed to the intercession of Innocenzo da Berzo: The first is a cure of a male child at the age of four from an aggressive form of leukemia, the second is the cure of another male child of the age of five from peritonitis.

Pope John XXIII presided over the beatification of Innocenzo da Berzo on 12 November 1961 and made him the patron of both Berzo and of children.
