= Predore =

- Comune
- Comune di Predore
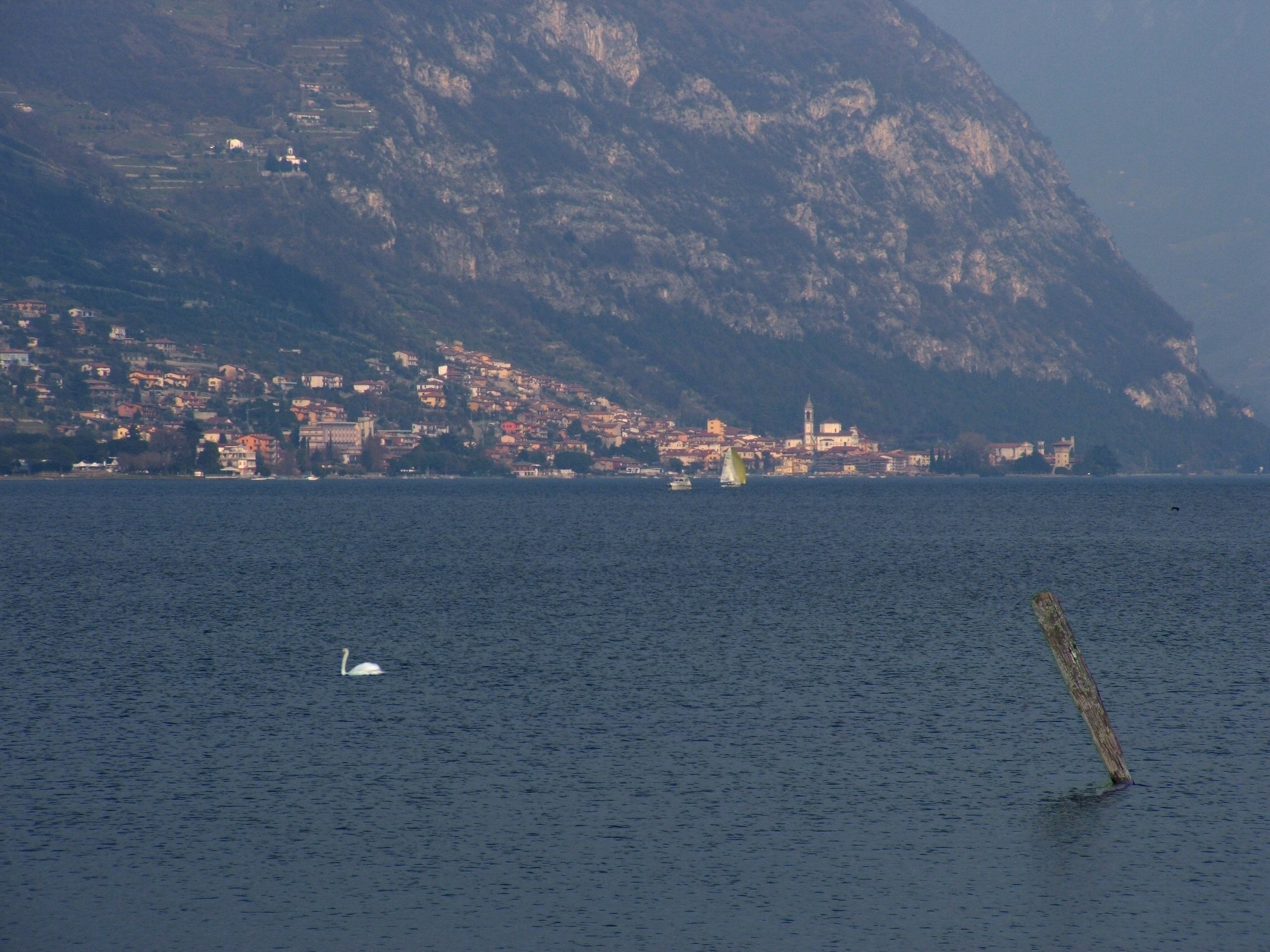

- Location within Italy Location within Lombardy
- Coordinates: 45°41′N 10°1′E
- Country: Italy
- Region: Lombardy
- Province: Province of Bergamo (BG)

Area
  - Total: 11.6 km^{2} (4.5 sq mi)
- Elevation: 190 m (620 ft)

Population (Dec. 2004)
  - Total: 1,837
  - Density: 158/km^{2} (410/sq mi)
- Demonym: Predoresi
- Time zone: UTC+1 (CET)
  - Summer (DST): UTC+2 (CEST)
- Postal code: 24060
- Dialing code: 035

Predore (Bergamasque: Predùr) is a comune (municipality) in the Province of Bergamo in the Italian region of Lombardy, located about 70 kilometres (43 mi) northeast of Milan and about 25 kilometres (16 mi) east of Bergamo. As of 31 December 2004, it had a population of 1,837 and an area of 11.6 square kilometres (4.5 mi^{2}).

Predore borders the following municipalities: Iseo, Sarnico, Tavernola Bergamasca, Viadanica, Vigolo.

== History ==
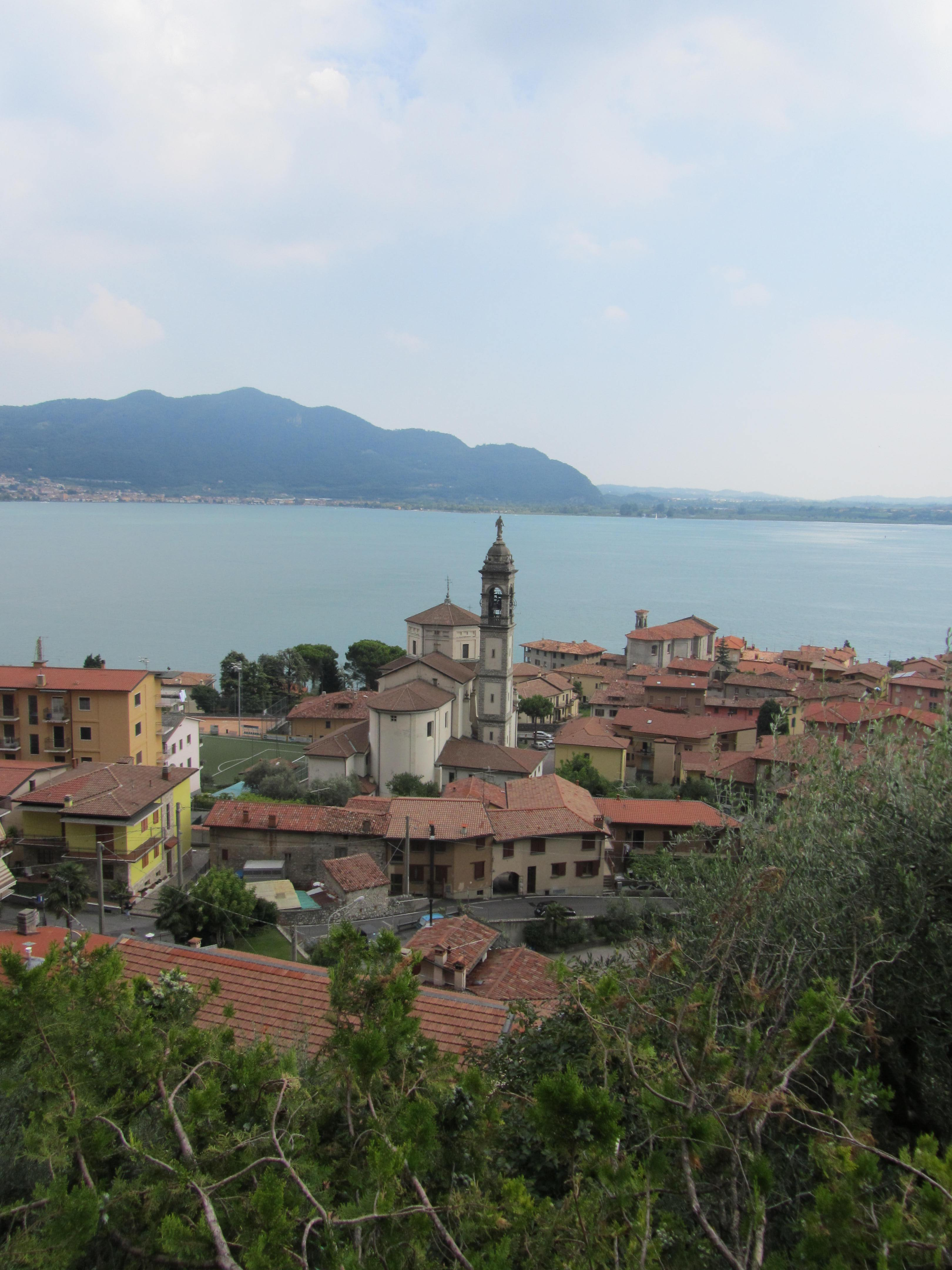

Located beyond the Valcalepio, on the right bank of Lake Iseo (which divides the province of Brescia from that of Bergamo), it is not easy to establish its origins.

Numerous artifacts from that period have been found: the remains of a Roman road and the ancient port, which made Predore an active center, some coins dating back to the third century, and remains of internal flooring dating back to the Roman period that were found by digging in the district of the lake.

Furthermore, at the beginning of the century, remains of bathing pools were found, suggesting that the Romans came to spend their holidays on the beaches of the village. Another evidence of the Roman presence is the temple dedicated to Diana, goddess of the woods and forests, made in white stone, which was donated in 1743 to the municipality of Bergamo.

In the Middle Ages, Predore was a fortress like the neighboring municipalities. On the shores of the lake there was a palace protected by two towers. In this period in the territory the main warlike conflicts were limited to those between Guelphs and Ghibellines. The half tower, symbol of the municipality, is legendarily linked to the disputes between these two factions.

== Demographic evolution ==
Historical population

| Year | Pop. | ±% |
|---|---|---|
| 1861 | 934 | — |
| 1871 | 977 | +4.6% |
| 1881 | 1,002 | +2.6% |
| 1901 | 1,122 | +12.0% |
| 1911 | 1,249 | +11.3% |

| Year | Pop. | ±% |
|---|---|---|
| 1921 | 1,382 | +10.6% |
| 1931 | 1,394 | +0.9% |
| 1936 | 1,307 | −6.2% |
| 1951 | 1,362 | +4.2% |
| 1961 | 1,394 | +2.3% |

| Year | Pop. | ±% |
|---|---|---|
| 1971 | 1,559 | +11.8% |
| 1981 | 1,644 | +5.5% |
| 1991 | 1,628 | −1.0% |
| 2001 | 1,776 | +9.1% |

Source: Data from ISTAT
