= Marone =

Marone Marù
- Comune
- Comune di Marone
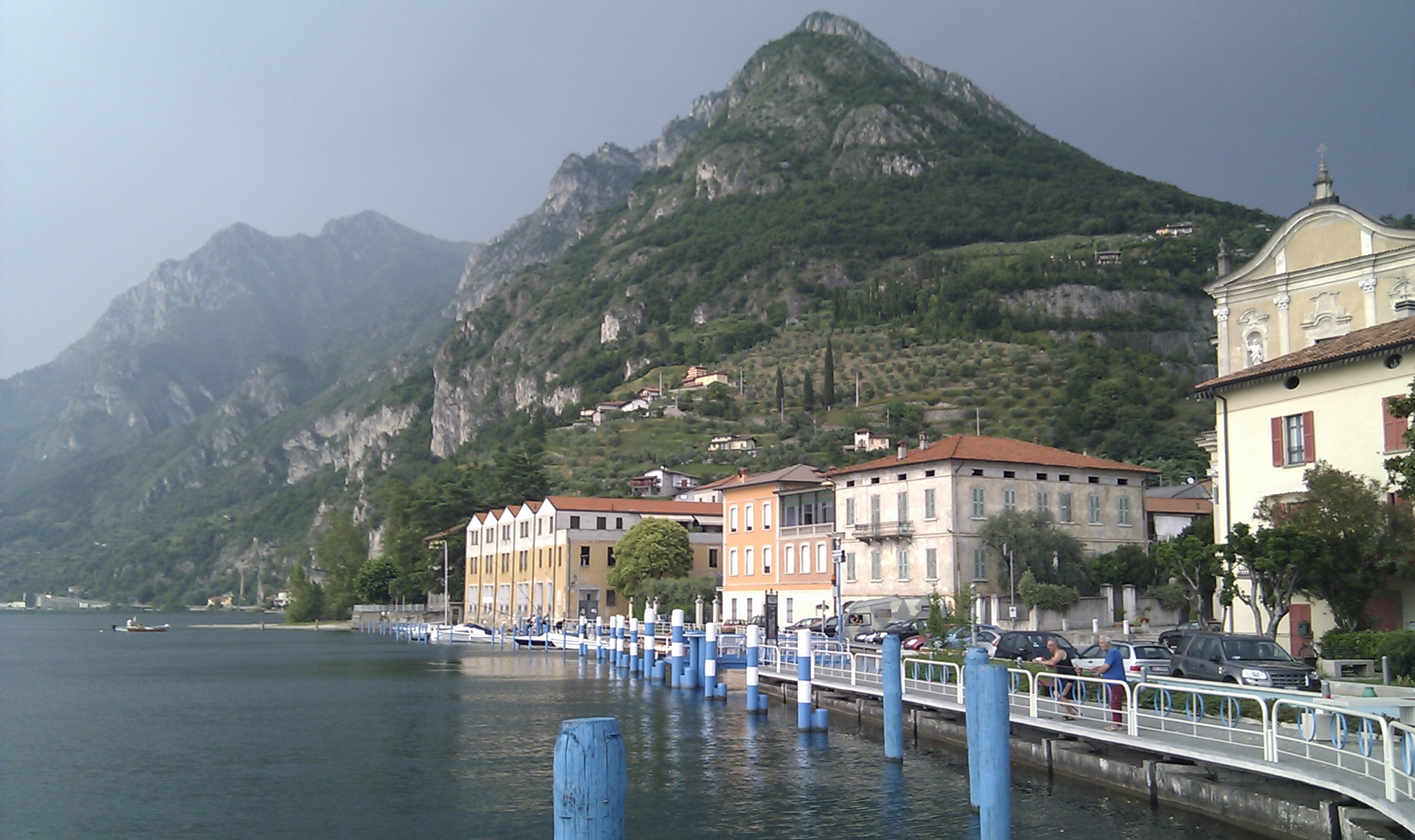

- Location within Italy Location within Lombardy
- Coordinates: 45°44′N 10°06′E
- Country: Italy
- Region: Lombardy
- Province: Brescia
- Frazioni: Ariolo, Collepiano, Monte Marone, Ponzano, Pregasso, Vello, Vesto

Area
  - Total: 22 km^{2} (8.5 sq mi)

Population (2011)
  - Total: 3,330
  - Density: 150/km^{2} (390/sq mi)
- Time zone: UTC+1 (CET)
  - Summer (DST): UTC+2 (CEST)
- Postal code: 25054
- Dialing code: 030
- Website: http://www.marone.it www.marone.it

Marone (Brescian: Marù) is a town and comune in the province of Brescia, in Lombardy, Italy.

== Physical geography ==
=== Territory ===
Marone is located on the eastern shore of Lake Iseo at about 200 m a.s.l. The territory is mainly mountainous. It borders to the north with Toline, a fraction of the municipality of Pisogne; to the east with the town of Zone and to the south with Sale Marasino.

There are two main water streams: the Bagnadore and the Opol. The latter descends from Passo Croce di Marone, receiving the Sestola stream, which has an underground channel that has been very important for the industrial development of the town.

== History ==
In Roman times, Marone was crossed by an important consular road, the Via Valeriana, which connected Brescia (lat. Brixia) with the Camonica Valley (lat. Vallis Camunnorum) coasting Lake Iseo (lat. Sebinus lacus).

Some archaeological findings found in the remains of a Roman villa in a locality called "Cò de Ela" could demonstrate the fact that the first settlements occurred in Roman times.

In the Middle Ages, the inhabitants settled in more defensible locations, far from the lake and streams, such as Pregasso, where in the 10th century there was a castle, which was later destroyed by a fire.

Marone became the administrative centre from the second half of the 16th century, when its development as an industrial center began.

== Economy ==
Since the 16th century, Marone has been considered one of the most important industrial centres of Lake Iseo. Currently the main activities are the processing of wool, the production of felts and the extraction of dolomite.

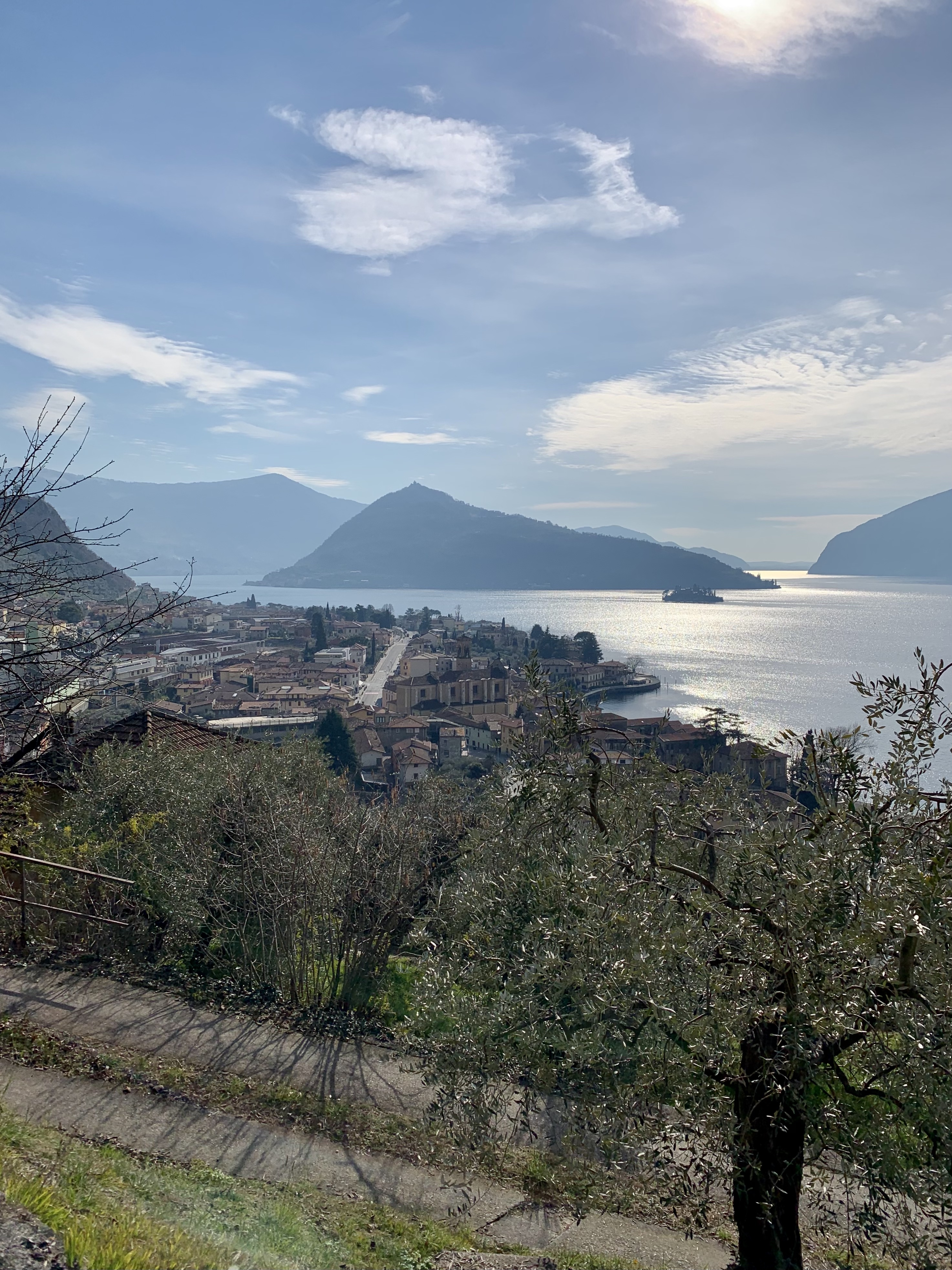
Panoramic view of Marone from Monte Marone.

In recent times, starting from the 10s of 2000, olive-growing has spread, from which the typical Lombard olive oil is produced. The municipality is also part of the national association "Città dell'Olio" since 2001.
