= Adrara San Rocco =

- Comune
- Comune di Adrara San Rocco
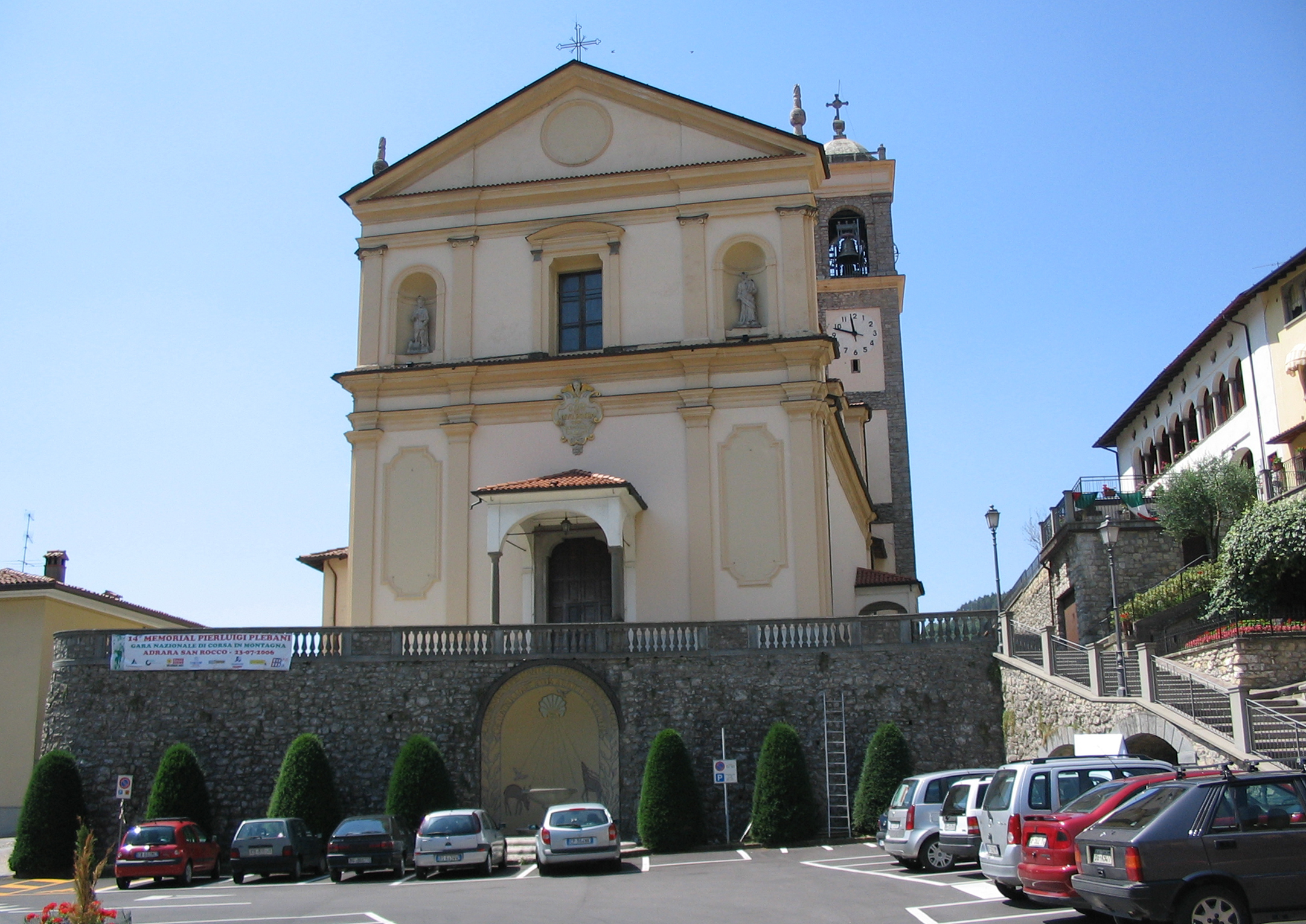
- Church of San Rocco, Adrara San Rocco

- Coat of arms

- Location of Adrara San Rocco in Italy Adrara San Rocco (Lombardy)
- Coordinates: 45°42′51″N 9°57′30″E
- Country: Italy
- Region: Lombardy
- Province: Bergamo (BG)

Government
  - Mayor: Tiziano Piccioli Cappelli

Area
  - Total: 9.23 km^{2} (3.56 sq mi)
- Elevation: 431 m (1,414 ft)

Population (30 April 2017)
  - Total: 820
  - Density: 89/km^{2} (230/sq mi)
- Demonym: Sanrocchesi
- Time zone: UTC+1 (CET)
  - Summer (DST): UTC+2 (CEST)
- Postal code: 24060
- Dialing code: 035
- Patron saint: St. Roch
- Saint day: August 16
- Website: Official website

Adrara San Rocco (Bergamasque: Dréra San Ròch or simply San Ròch) is an Italian town in the province of Bergamo, in the administrative region of Lombardy. The town is located about 25 kilometres (16 mi) east of Bergamo and is situated in the Guerna river valley. The town is part of the Mountain Community of Monte Bronzone Sebino.

The hills of San Fermo attract tourists for sports such as mountain biking, trekking and paragliding.

== History ==
The first documented evidence of settlement was the village of Adrara, which had not yet been divided into the two existing entities.

The province of Bergamo was devastated by fratricidal conflict between the Guelph and Ghibelline, which in turn created a large influx of refugees into Adrara from these remote and quiet areas. However, fighting broke out in Adrara as well and a castle was built to protect inhabitants from the incursions of violence among the villagers.

During the 14th century, the territory fell under the domination of the Calepio family, who took possession of most of the valley. In the following century the arrival of the Venetian Republic put a definitive end to the factional struggles. Adrara experienced a period of peace and economic prosperity, along with a corresponding increase in population.

After this time of peace, territorial conflicts emerged between the upstream parish of San Rocco and the downstream village of San Martino.

In 1668, the territory of Adrara was divided into two different entities: Adrara San Rocco and Adrara San Martino. Lingering disputes took a century to resolve. The division was formalized in 1754, ending with the awarding of five ninths of the land to the community of San Rocco and the remaining four ninths to San Martino.

== Church ==
The parish church was dedicated to San Rocco, and dates from 1539. This church was restored during the seventeenth and nineteenth centuries. It has a long staircase outside that leads to the entrance. Inside are frescoes, among which are those made by the workshop of Francesco Capella.

The Shrine of Saint Faustino and Saint Giovita, better known as the sanctuary of the dead of Bondo, was built in the fourteenth century.

== People ==
Literary critic and biographical author Eugenio Donadoni was born in San Rocco in 1870.
