= Adrara San Martino =

- Comune
- Comune di Adrara San Martino
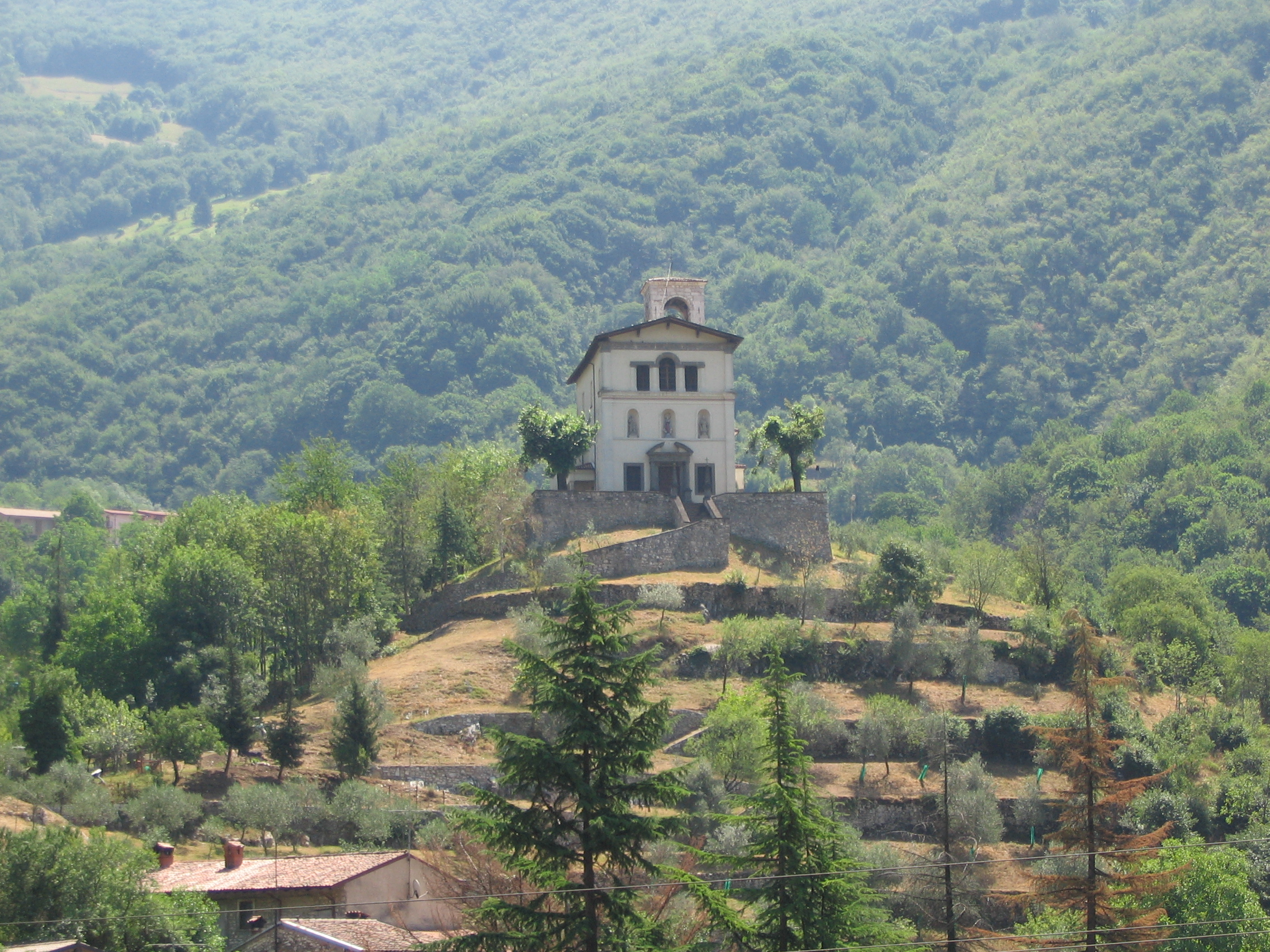
- Church of Santa Maria Annunciata al Monte.

- Coat of arms

- Location of Adrara San Martino in Italy Adrara San Martino (Lombardy)
- Coordinates: 45°42′N 09°57′E
- Country: Italy
- Region: Lombardy
- Province: Bergamo (BG)

Government
  - Mayor: Sergio Capoferri

Area
  - Total: 12.53 km^{2} (4.84 sq mi)
- Elevation: 355 m (1,165 ft)

Population (30 April 2017)
  - Total: 2,262
  - Density: 180.5/km^{2} (467.6/sq mi)
- Demonym: Adraresi
- Time zone: UTC+1 (CET)
  - Summer (DST): UTC+2 (CEST)
- Postal code: 24060
- Dialing code: 035
- Patron saint: Saint Martin
- Saint day: November 11
- Website: Official website

Adrara San Martino (Bergamasque: Dréra San Marti) is a comune in the province of Bergamo, in Lombardy, northern Italy.

== Main sights ==
The main attraction is the parish church of San Martino (15th century, restored later), in white stone. It houses paintings by Giovanni Carnovali, Francesco Coghetti and Giacomo Trecourt. The bell tower, with ogival windows, is also from the 15th century.

Other sights include the sanctuary of Santa Maria Annunciata (17th century), the Romanesque religious complex of Sant'Alessandro (11th century), with fragments of 14th-century frescoes, and ruins of the medieval castle.

== Coat of arms ==
The coat of arms shows a brick tower on a blue diagonal cross, on a white background.

== See also ==
- Adrara San Rocco, next to Adrara San Martino
