= Lepreno =

Frazione in Lombardy, Italy

- Frazione
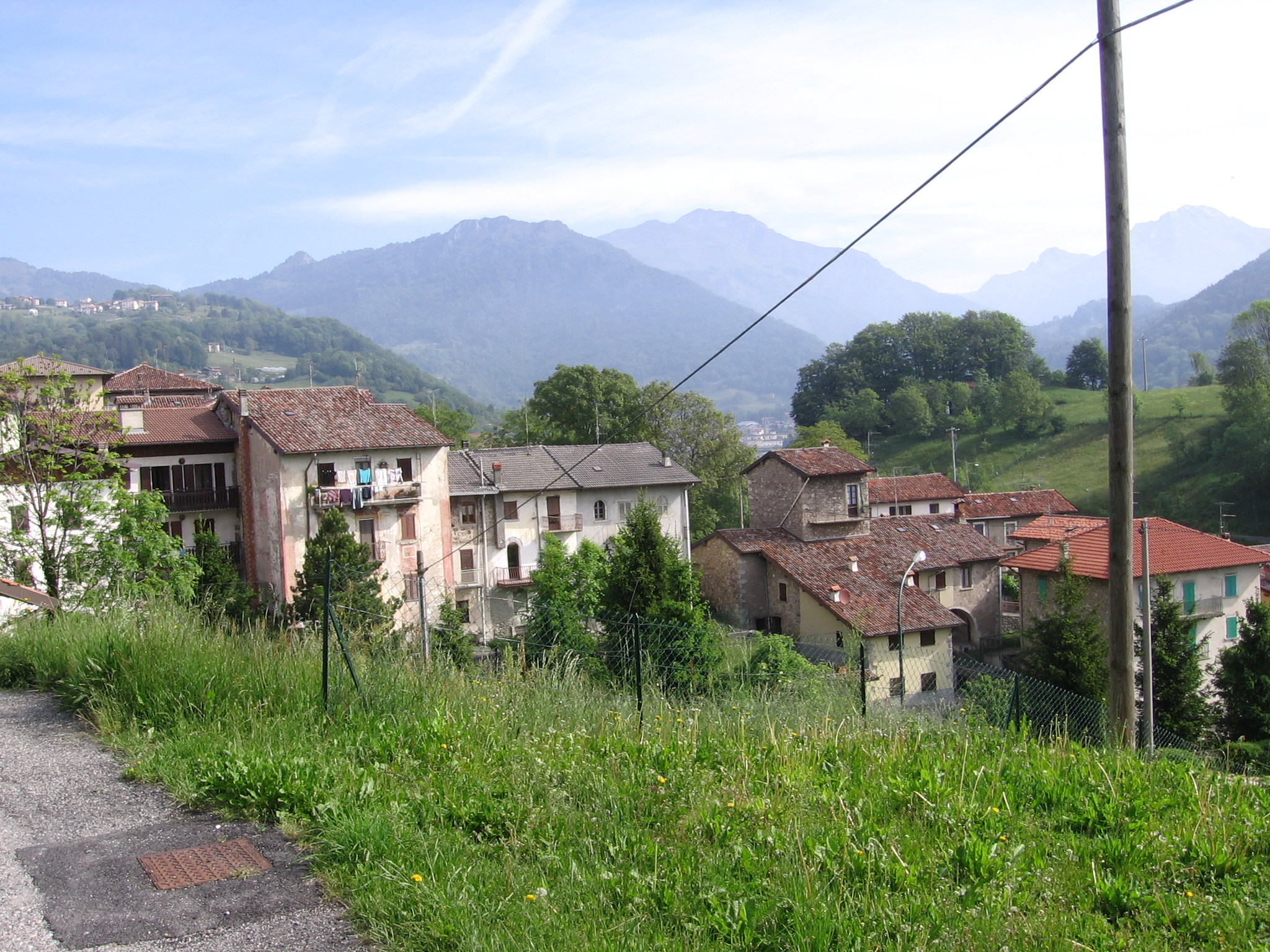
- View on Lepreno.

- Location of Lepreno in Italy
- Country: Italy
- Region: Lombardy
- Province: Bergamo
- Comune: Serina
- Elevation: 825 m (2,707 ft)

Population (2019)
  - Total: 160
- Demonym: Leprenesi
- Time zone: UTC+1 (CET)
  - Summer (DST): UTC+2 (CEST)
- Postal code: 24017
- Dialing code: 0345
- Patron saint: Alexander of Bergamo, James the Great
- Saint day: 26 August, 25 July

Lepreno [leˈpreːno] (Levrè [lɛˈvɾe] in Bergamasco) is a frazione of the italian comune of Serina, Province of Bergamo.

== Location ==
Lepreno can be reached by following a mountain road from its capoluogo, Serina.

== Etymology ==
According to Luigi Carrara Zanotti, a doctor in medicine and surgery who in 1874 published the book "Serina: Studio ed osservazioni " (english: "Serina: Study and observations") under the financial support of the comune of Serina, the toponym Lepreno comes from the great abundance of hares, in italian "Lepre", in the area. These animals were reserved as tribute that hunters gave to bishops of Bergamo. Furthermore, there are proofs of the use of the name Leverene when referring to this small town dating back as early as 1186. Another possible origin of the toponym, discredited by Zanotti as just a folk tale, would want the name to come from an event (of which there is not historical certainty) that took place in the frazione: during a battle fought in 1295 in Lepreno, a white hare would've ran into the enemy field, confusing and then causing the fleeing of the attackers, saving the small village. It is interesting to note how Zanotti, in his book, uses the name Leprenno instead of the modern Lepreno: its clear that in just a century and a half a slight variation of the frazione's name has occurred.

== History ==
From the same Zanotti, whose work contains much information summarised from other authors, we learn that in the past there were some people who studied and talked about Lepreno in their researches about Bergamo and its province.

=== Foundation ===
In the "Effemeridi ", one of the main historiographical works that treats in detail the history of the Bergamasco, the territory around Bergamo, Donato Calvi of Bergamo, author, it is mentioned how the foundation of the comune of Serina took place just in 1234. But Zanotti, as a counterargument, highlights how that's very unlikely, since there already was the Carrara family living in the Val Brembana and since by that year the population and area of Serina was already high enough that it was disputed with the inhabitants of the nearby village of Dossena. The foundation of Serina and Lepreno then logically is antecedent to 1237.

The most plausible hypothesis is that Serina and Lepreno were founded by groups of alemanni that descended in Italy under the command of Charlemagne in 772. During that year, the longobard King Desiderius found himself enraged after the repudiation of his daughter, Desiderata of the Lombards, by Charlemagne, and proclaimed Gerberga's sons lawful heirs to the Frankish throne, then attacking Pope Adrian I for not crowning them as such. So, the pontiff turned to the Franks for help, who responded by sending troops and sieging for eight months Pavia, capital of the Lombard Kingdom. At the end of this war, many germanic peoples remained in Italy, spreading in various areas. The founders of Serina and Lepreno thus were probably part of these populations, and the element proving the great plausibility of this hypothesis is an ancient manuscript dating back to the 10 March 829, a diplomatic code directed towards the bishop of Bergamo that was signed also by witnesses of germanic origin. In conclusion, according to this whole hypothesis, the year of the foundation of Serina and Lepreno is to be set around 790.

==== Founders ====
In the book "Sacra Istoria di Bergamo ", in english "Sacred History of Bergamo" by Mario Muzio, published in 1719, a statement made by Gerolamo Ceroni about the founders of Serina can be found: he defines founders of the comune two brothers from Innsbruck, in today's Austria, called Ceronio and Carrerio. They were the founders of both Serina and Lepreno. Zanotti also highlights that their names were still alive at his time, and they still are: in the toponyms, with Carrera being a contrada at Zanotti's time and a via, a road as of today, and also in the onomastics of the area, with a presence of people having as last name Carrara and Ceroni.

=== From the foundation to today ===
During the Venetian rule over Bergamo and its nearby inhabited centers, Lepreno already had its own governing authorities, whose political relationship with Serina was not clear though, while since 1190 Lepreno had had its own parish, which is one of the oldest in all of the province.

Following, in 1815 Lepreno was designated as its own comune, but after just two years it was then reunited to Serina.

== Monuments and main sights ==
=== Pieve Prepositurale di San Giacomo Maggiore Apostolo e Sant'Alessandro Martire ===
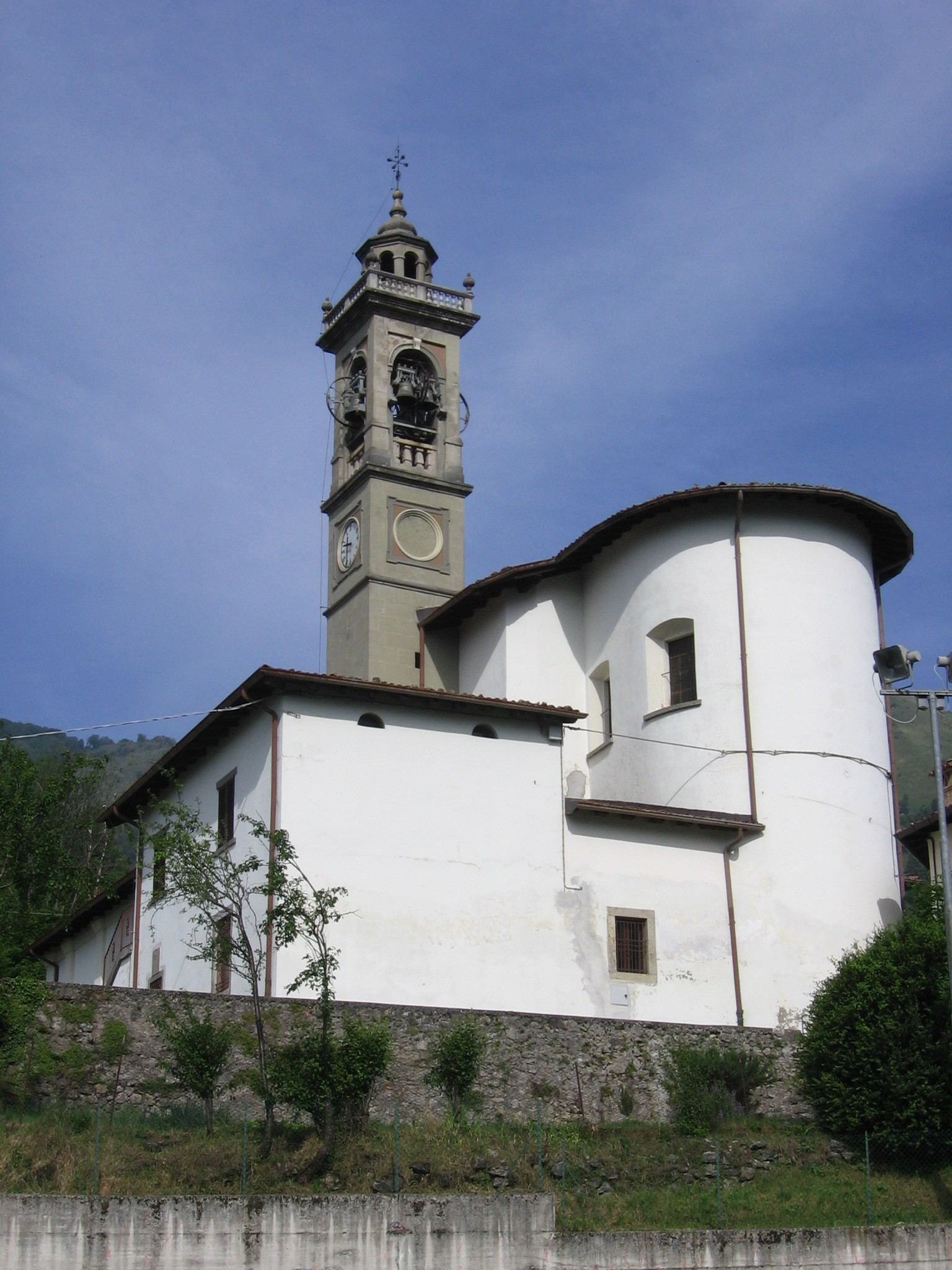
The Church of San Giacomo Maggiore and Sant'Alessandro Martire in Lepreno.

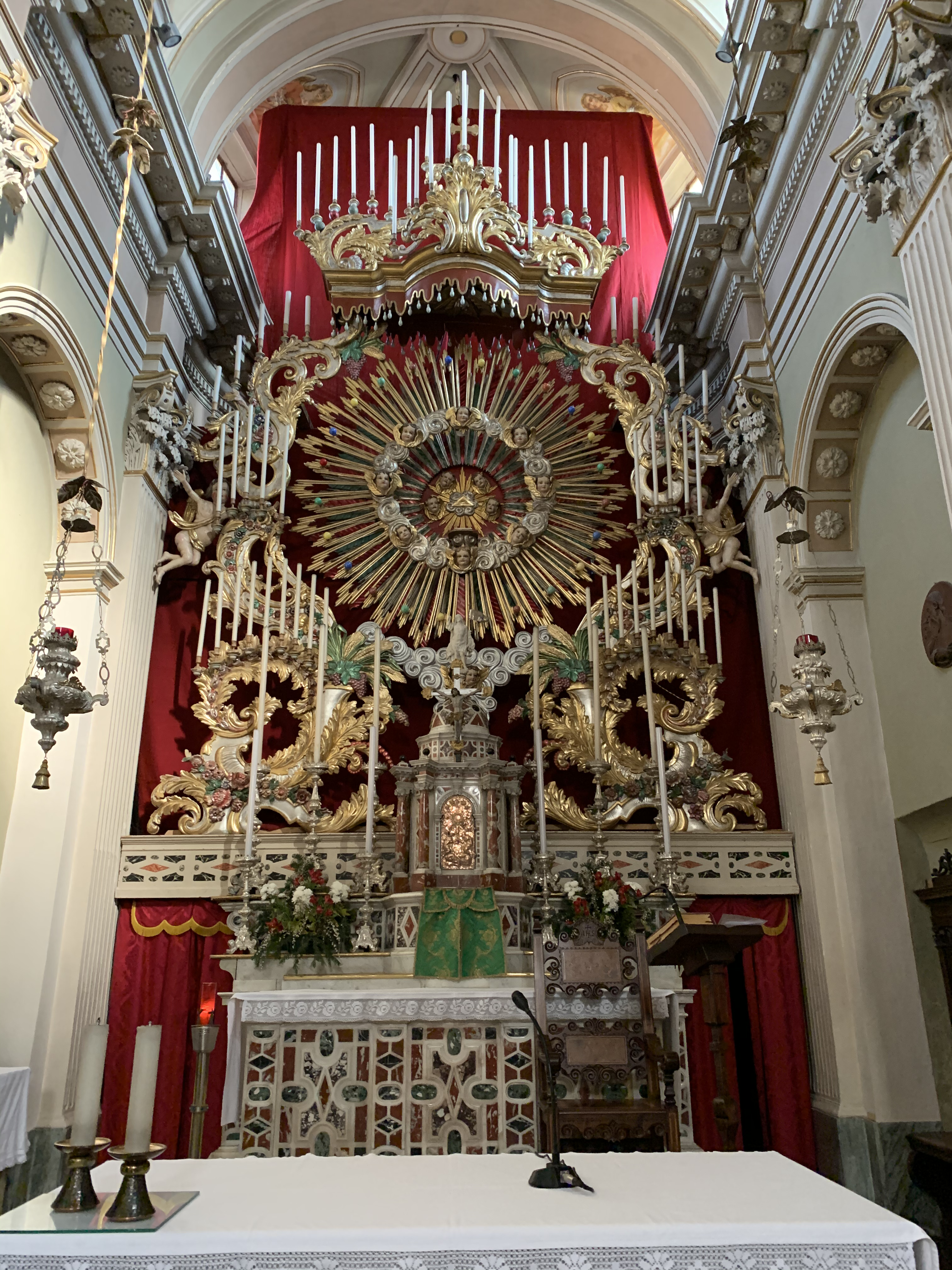
The scenographic machine used in Lepreno for the Triduo dei Defunti, a religious tradition from the Bergamo area that takes place usually during November or during Lent.

Lepreno's church has a very ancient history, with its first construction dating back to 1190 after the authorization given by Pope Clement III for its foundation. The bishop, Guala da Telgate, sent Giovanni da Bulgare to designate the construction place of the church, where he symbolically planted a cross in the ground.

The disagreements of the chapters of the Duomo di Bergamo and the Church of Saint Alexander of Bergamo was shortly made note by the assemblies of clerics who were devoted to Saint Alexander of Bergamo themselves, who sent their representative to take the cross planted by Giovanni on behalf of Guala out of the ground, since they were not involved in the process. After Guala da Telgate and the chapters got back on good terms, it was permitted to Giovanni de Bulgari to go and designate and bless the first stone used for the construction of the church, that was going now to be dedicated to Saint Alexander of Bergamo, too.

In the Church, the processional cross is kept. Dating back to the XV century, it is made in niello on silver and gold foil with tiny rinascimental ornaments. On the pole are represented the Annunciation, a pelican, Mary Magdalene, Mary of Clopas and the crucifix. At the lower end of the pole there is a sphere with four historiated roundels depicting the titular saints of the churches of Serina.

The Altar, too, is interesting to study, as it is made in various polychrome marbles gifted to Lepreno by a certain Antonio Pagani. He bought it from english shippers in Genoa and sent twelve crates to his parish of birth.

== Economy ==
Lepreno isn't a rich comune. Its location is very disadvantageous because of the soil and the geographical conditions, which make agricultural activities difficult, and because of the lack of connection to the nearby towns both in the past and nowadays: the only other town that can be reached from Lepreno is Serina. But still, in town citizens lived in harmony, and managed to somewhat prosper, especially thanks to the rural bank founded in 1905.

Though even Lepreno had its own small share of traffic in past times, because the parish comprehended various other comuni.
