= Istituto Musicale =

Istituto Musicale may refer to:

- Istituto Musicale, a former name of the Florence Conservatory
- Istituto Musicale, a former name of the Turin Conservatory

== See also ==
- Civico Istituto Musicale
