= Giulio Gorra =

Italian painter (1832–1884)

Giulio Gorra (1832 –1884) was an Italian painter.

He was born in Cremona and died in Turin. He trained under Enrico Scuri at the Accademia Carrara in Bergamo. he left the school in 1852 and by 1857 was in Milan. He decorated books and magazines. In 1859, he became a volunteer of Garibaldi and participated in his Invasion of Trentino of 1866.
