= Enrico Scuri =

Italian painter (1805–1884)

Enrico Scuri (April 26, 1805 – 1884) was an Italian painter, active in a Romantic style.

== Biography ==
He was born and died in Bergamo. By 13 years of age, he became a pupil of Giuseppe Diotti, whose other students at the time included Francesco Coghetti and Giovanni Carnovali.

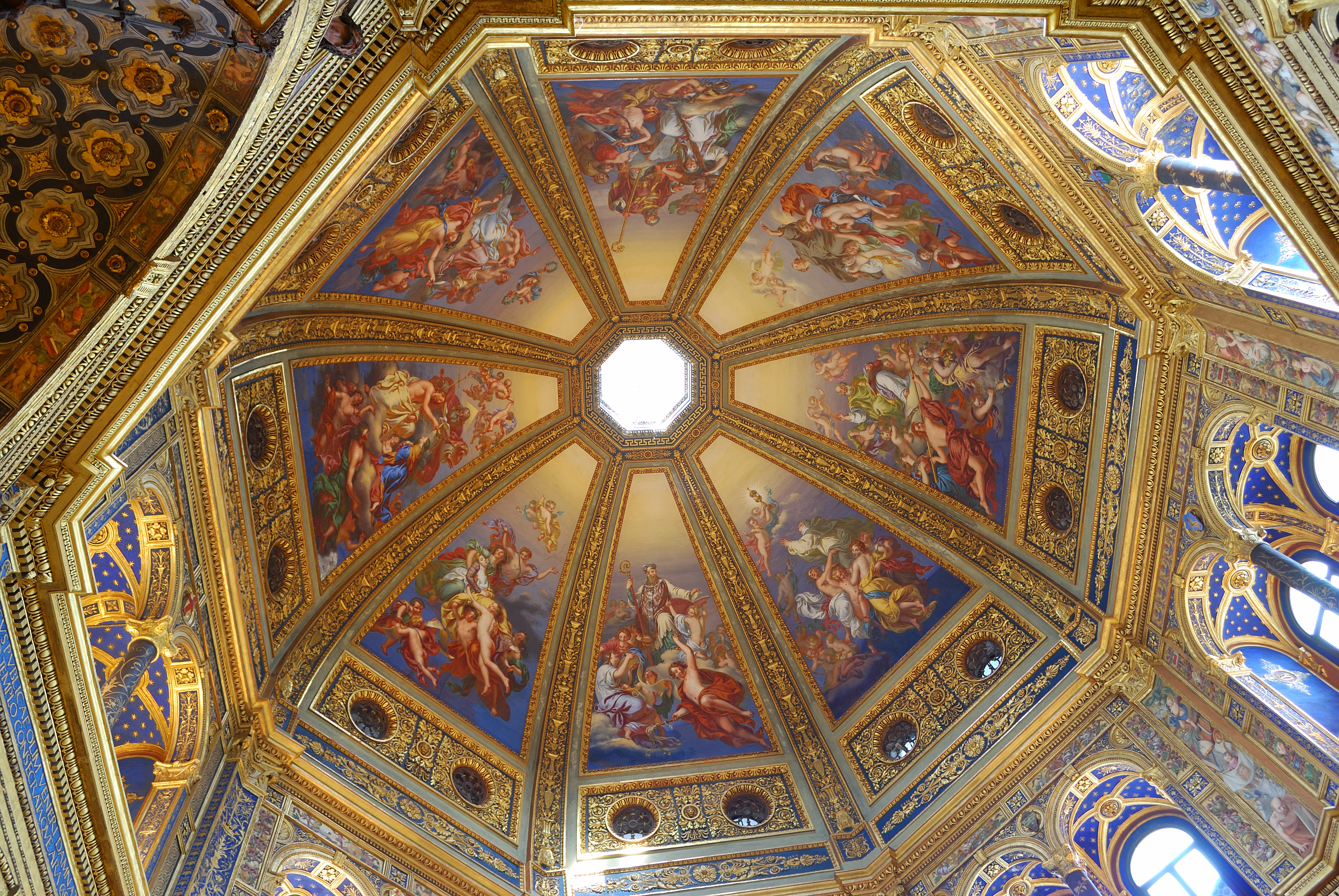
Cupola of the Incoronata at Lodi

He was prolific. He painted the cupola of the Sanctuary of the Incoronata at Lodi in Lombardy. He also frescoed the cupola of the Immacolata in Bergamo, the frescoes in the church of Sant'Alessandro in Zebedia in Milan, and frescoes in the church of Stezzano.

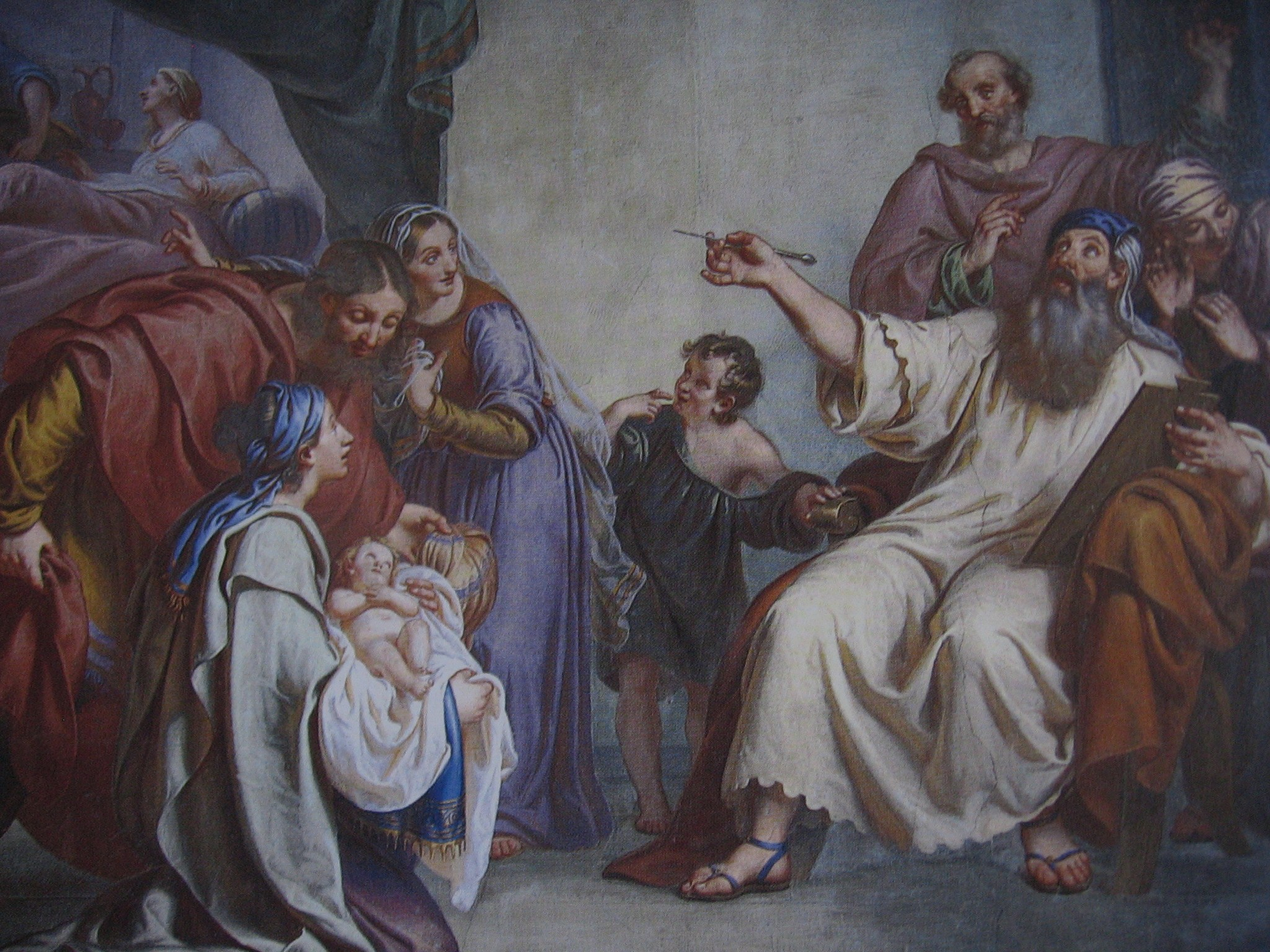
Birth of John the Baptist, frescoes in church of Stezzano

He frescoed four medallions in a chapel dedicated to the Blessed Alessandro Saul, in the church of Sant' Alessandro in Milan. Among his paintings of sacred subjects are the following: St Simon Stock, receives the scapular from the Virgin Mary, altarpiece commissioned by the fabbriceria of Calolzio; Saints Nazarius and Celsus condemned to Martyrdom commissioned by the fabbriceria of Urgnano; Saint Helen and the Miracle of the Cross, commissioned by the fabbriceria of Rudiano; The Triumph of the Addolorata, for the church of San Lorenzo in Lodi; The Transit of St Joseph for the parochial church of Seriate; and Blessing of the Children, commissioned by Count Petrobelli of Bergamo.

Among his paintings of historical or romantic subjects are: Death of Aganodeca (Ossian); The Hunt of Bernabò Visconti (nocturne commissioned by marchese Antonio Visconti of Milan); Final Scene of Filippo by Alfieri; Diana and Endymion, a moonlit scene; Satan surprised by the Angel Ithuriel, (moonlit scene based on Milton's Paradise Lost), bought by prince Pyotr Gorchakov of St Petersburg, Russia; Tardi rimorsi; Dance of Death (Goethe) in two paintings of moonlit scenes; A Witch's Sabbath (lamp-lit); and E caddi come corpo morto cade (based on lines from Dante).

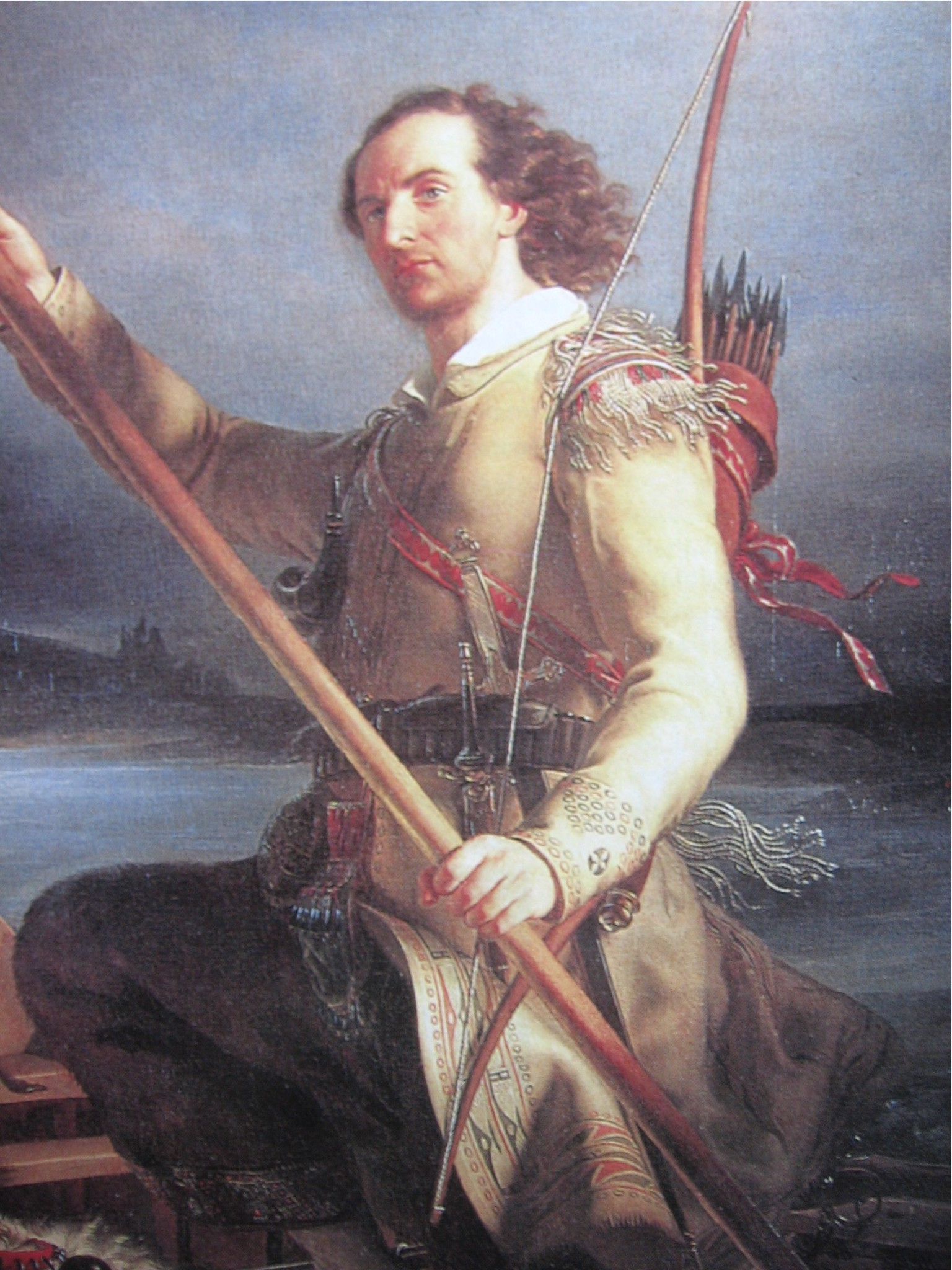
Beltrami discovers the source of the Mississippi

Among his historical portraits are the following: one of the famous traveler Giacomo Costantino Beltrami of Bergamo, discovering the source of the Mississippi, now at the Accademia Carrara; of the composer Simone Mayr completing a melody, canvas once in the Bergamo Conservatory. He also completed many private portraits.

He also made drawings for the Last Night of Nero, inspired by the drama of Pietro Cossa, and pursued as a design for a sipario (theater curtain), exhibited at Turin in 1875, and at a hall of the Carrara Academy.

Scuri became honorary associate of many artistic societies. After the death of Diotti, he replaced his master as director of the Accademia Carrara in Bergamo, where he taught for forty years. Among Enrico's pupils were Giovanni Gavazzeni and Giulio Gorra.
