= Ponziano Loverini =

Italian painter (1845–1929)

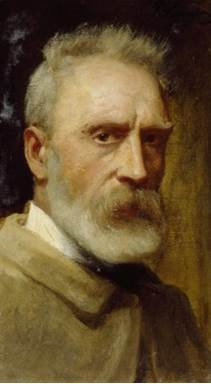
Self-portrait (1900)

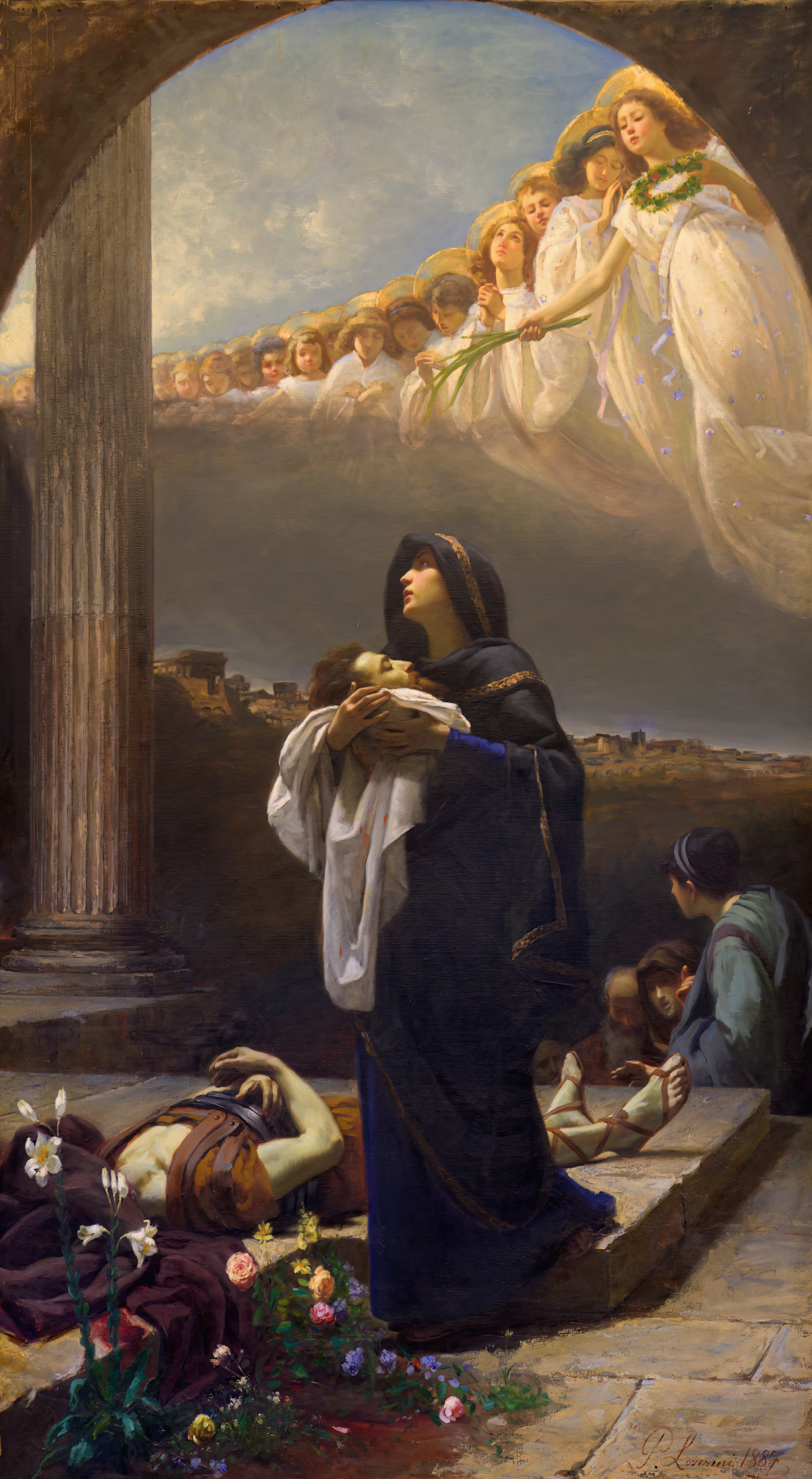
The Martyrdom of Saint Alexander of Bergamo

Ponziano Loverini (July 6, 1845 – August 21, 1929) was an Italian painter, known primarily for his canvases and frescoes of sacred subjects.

== Biography ==
Born in Gandino to a humble but pious tailor, Ponziano was helped by his uncle to enroll (1858) at the Accademia Carrara in Bergamo. A stipend from the city of Gandino sponsored his art study. There, he was a pupil of the painter Enrico Scuri. In 1881, he exhibited at Milan: St Bishop Philastrius; in 1884 at Turin he exhibited the large canvas depicting St Francis entering a monastic order. He exhibited at Milan a canvas depicting young nudes before a white background. In 1887 at Venice, he exhibited Coeci vident. Among other works: Studi dal vero; Il prediletto della nonna were exhibited at Milan in 1886. In 1887, he painted a large canvas of San Grata in honor of the priestly jubilee of Pope Leo XIII, which was sent to the Vatican Pinacoteca.

He married in 1880, and had four children, but the deaths of two of them in infancy plunged him into a depression, which worsened when his wife died in 1895.

Loverini also painted some portraits, watercolors. and studies of various genres. Among his fresco work, he painted the four biblical figures: Job, Ezekiel, Jeremiah, and Tobit, (1913) for the Chapel of Monuments in the Cimitero Unico of Bergamo. In 1887 he began a cycle of frescoes depicting the Story of St Peter for the parish church of Trescore Balneario. He also frescoed in the Basilica of San Pietro in Ciel d'Oro in Pavia. From 1888 and in 1893, he completed five large canvases for the Sanctuary of the Madonna del Rosario of Pompei.

In 1893, he became an associate of the Atheneum of Bergamo. In 1895, he was one of the founders of the Bergamese Artists’ circle, and named a member of the "Commission to Conserve Monuments" for the Province of Bergamo. Finally in 1899, he was designated director of the School of Painting of the Accademia Carrara, replacing Cesare Tallone, a post he held till 1926, when he resigned due to ill health. His alumns included the painters: Giacomo Belotti, Luigi Cassani, Guglielmo Guglielmini, Giorgio Oprandi, Natale Morzenti, Mauro Pellicioli and Pasquale Arzuffi. He painted the Il Cantico di frate Sole for the Vatican, and in 1904, Pope Pius X sent it to the London Exposition. He died in 1929 in Gandino.
