= Alexander of Bergamo =

Italian saint (died c. 303)

Saint Alexander of Bergamo
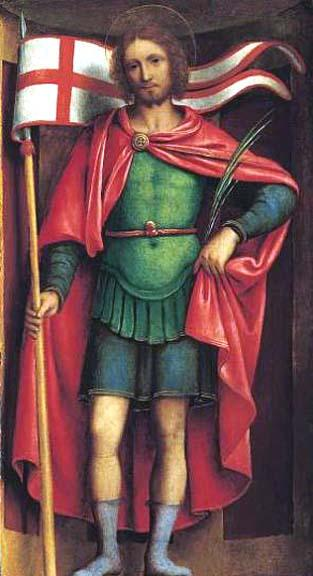
- Alexander of Bergamo, Bernardino Luini, ca. 1525.
- Born: III century
- Died: 26 August 303; Bergamo
- Venerated in: Roman Catholic Church; Eastern Orthodox Church
- Major shrine: Relics rest in chapel in ducal castle of Pescolanciano
- Feast: August 26 (Roman Catholic Church), September 22 (Orthodox Church)
- Attributes: Depicted as a soldier; military standard bearing white lily
- Patronage: various comuni in Italy (see Patronage)
- Military career
- Died: 26 August 303; Bergamo
- Cause of death: Christian martyr
- Allegiance: Roman Empire
- Branch: Roman army
- Rank: Vexillifer
- Unit: Legio Tebea

Alexander of Bergamo (died c. 303) is the patron saint of Bergamo, as well as Capriate San Gervasio and Cervignano d'Adda. Alexander may have been a Roman soldier or resident of Bergamo who was tortured and killed for not renouncing his Christian faith. Details of his life are uncertain, but subsequent Christian stories consider him a centurion of the Theban Legion commanded by Maurice.

== Legend ==
Before the commencement of the Diocletianic Persecution in 303, both Galerius and Maximian in the West inaugurated, on their own responsibility, a crusade against Christianity and sought particularly to remove all Christians from the armies. Alexander, traditionally considered the standard bearer of the Theban Legion, was one of the victims of this persecution. He is reputed to have been a survivor of the decimation (the killing of every tenth man) ordered against the legion at Agaunum. He fled to Italy.

At Milan, he was recognized and imprisoned in the Zebedeo Prison in Milan, later site of the church of Sant'Alessandro in Zebedia. He refused to renounce his Christian faith. However, he was visited in jail by Fidelis and Bishop Maternus. With the help of Fidelis, Alexander managed to escape. Alexander fled to Como but was captured again.

Brought back to Milan, he knocked down the sacrificial altar, enraging Emperor Maximian. Alexander was condemned to death by decapitation. However, the executioner's arms went stiff during the execution. He was imprisoned again, but Alexander once again managed to escape and ended up in Bergamo after passing through Fara Gera d'Adda and Capriate San Gervasio. At Bergamo, he was the guest of the lord Crotacius, who bid him to hide from his persecutors. However, Alexander decided to become a preacher instead and converted many natives of Bergamo, including Firmus and Rusticus, who were later martyred. Alexander was once again captured and was finally decapitated on August 26, 303, on the spot now occupied by the church of San Alessandro in Colonna.

== Veneration ==
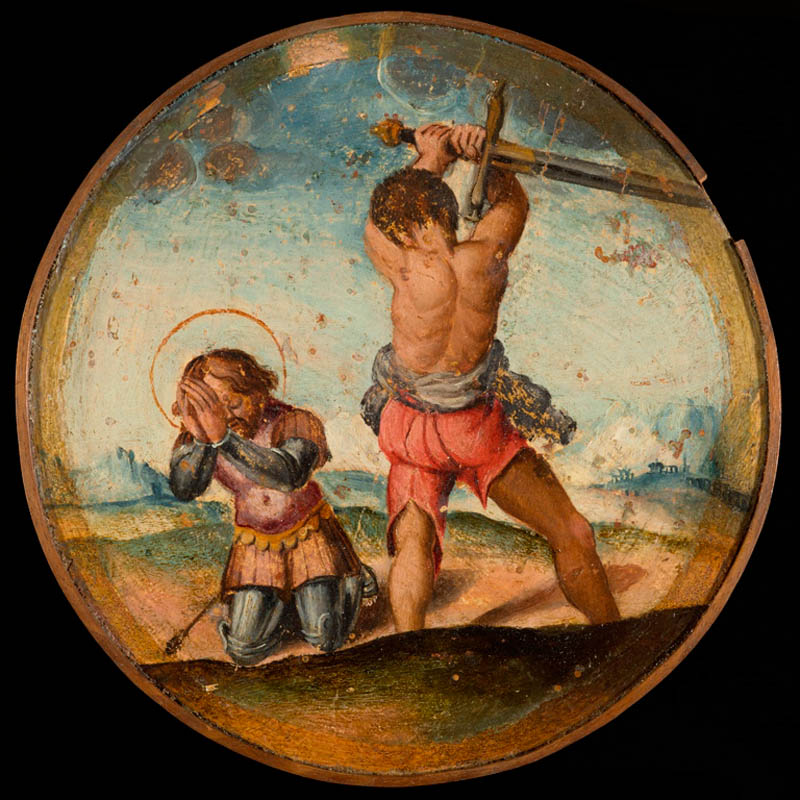
The Martyrdom of St. Alexander (Workshop of Lorenzo Lotto, after 1560)

The oldest Passio dates from about the 8th century, but his cult is much earlier. Alexander was most likely a Roman soldier, native or resident of Bergamo, tortured and killed for not having renounced his Christian faith.

Bergamo Cathedral is dedicated to him. He is one of the saints in the dedication of the church in Rome for natives of Bergamo.

The 1887 "The Martyrdom of Saint Alexander of Bergamo" by Ponziano Loverini is in the Pinacoteca Vaticana.

=== Patronage ===
Many italian cities and towns have Saint Alexander of Bergamo as their patron saint. Some of them are:

- Diocese and city of Bergamo
- Albano Sant'Alessandro (BG)
- Barzio (LC)
- Besozzo (VA)
- Capriate San Gervasio (BG)
- Caronno Pertusella (VA)
- Castel Gabbiano (CR)
- Cervignano d'Adda (LO)
- Cesate (MI)
- Colnago - frazione of Cornate d'Adda (MB)
- Copreno - frazione of Lentate sul Seveso (MB)
- Fara Gera d'Adda (BG)
- Grassobbio (BG)
- Lepreno (BG)
- Melfi (PZ)
- Melzo (MI)
- Mozzate (CO)
- Paladina (BG)
- Pieve Emanuele (MI)
- Robbiate (LC)
- Traona (SO)
- Villongo Sant'Alessandro (BG)
- Zeme (PV)
