= Giovanni Gavazzeni =

Italian painter

Giovanni Gavazzeni (13 September 1841 – 29 November 1907) was an Italian painter of portraits and sacred subjects.

He was born in Talamona in the Valtellina. Giovanni studied at the Accademia Carrara in Bergamo under Enrico Scuri. He painted a Virgin Mary with Souls in Heaven for the chapel in the cemetery of Delebio, as well as devotional frescoes on the walls of houses. He also painted frescoes for churches in Caspoggio, Ponte, and a Holy Family for the parish church in Villa di Tirano. He also painted the ceiling (Assumption of the Virgin) and a chapel (Death of St Joseph) of the Collegiata in Sondrio.
