= Azzano =

Azzano may refer to places in Italy.

== Municipalities (comuni) ==
- Azzano d'Asti, in the Province of Asti
- Azzano Decimo, in the Province of Pordenone
- Azzano Mella, in the Province of Brescia
- Azzano San Paolo, in the Province of Bergamo
- Castel d'Azzano, in the Province of Verona

== Civil parishes (frazioni) ==
- Azzano (Mezzegra), in the municipality of Mezzegra (Province of Como)
- Azzano (Premariacco), in the municipality of Premariacco (Province of Udine)
- Azzano (Spoleto), in the municipality of Spoleto (Province of Perugia)
- Azzano (Seravezza), in the municipality of Seravezza (Province of Lucca)
