= Zanica =

- Comune
- Comune di Zanica
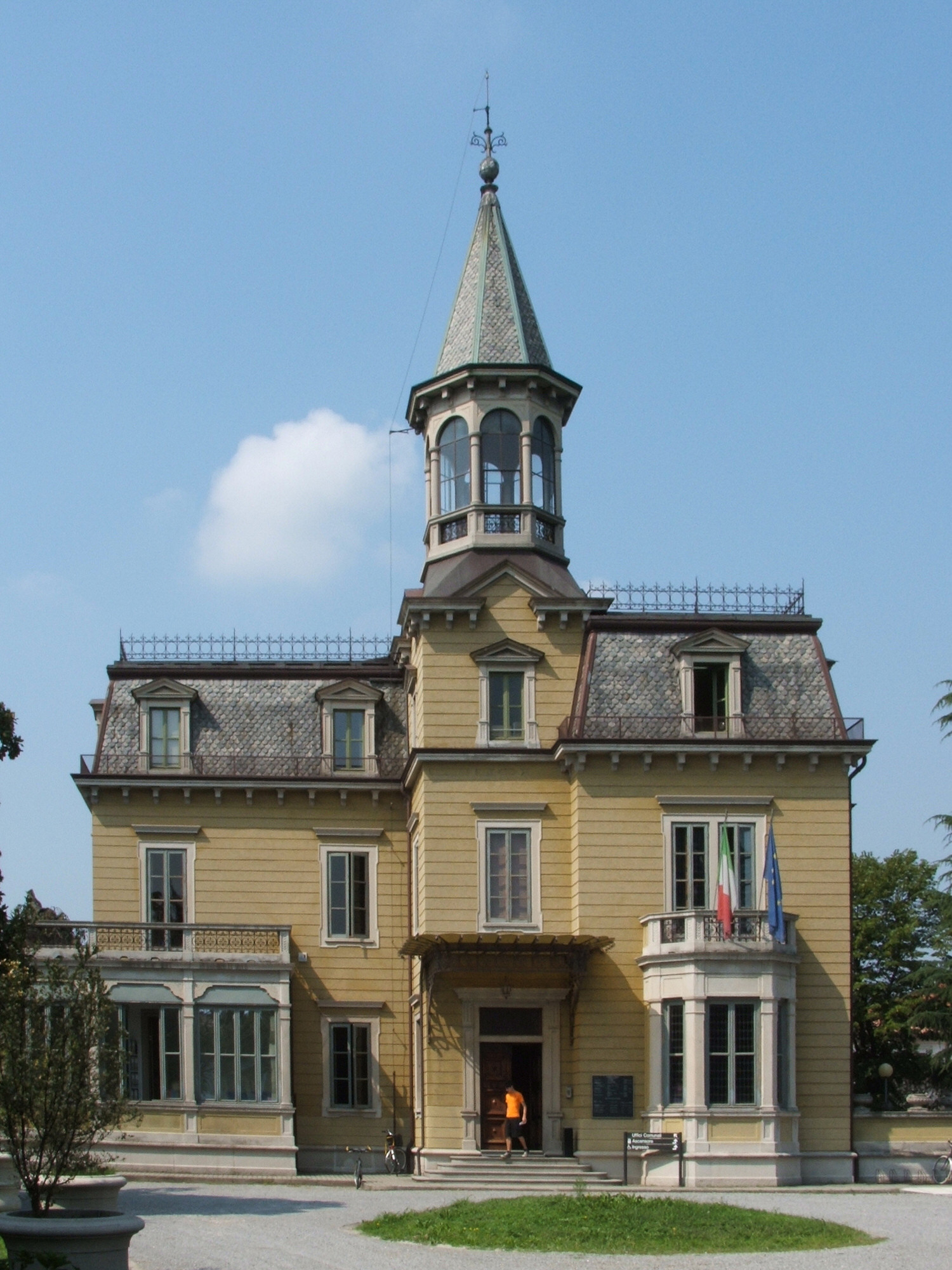
- Town hall

- Location within Italy Location within Lombardy
- Coordinates: 45°38′N 9°41′E
- Country: Italy
- Region: Lombardy
- Province: Bergamo (BG)
- Frazioni: Capannelle, Padergnone

Government
  - Mayor: Luigi Alberto Locatelli (Lista civica Zanica futuro comune)

Area
  - Total: 14.66 km^{2} (5.66 sq mi)
- Elevation: 210 m (690 ft)

Population (31 December 2019)
  - Total: 8,804
  - Density: 600.5/km^{2} (1,555/sq mi)
- Demonym: Zanichesi
- Time zone: UTC+1 (CET)
  - Summer (DST): UTC+2 (CEST)
- Postal code: 24050
- Dialing code: 035
- ISTAT code: 016245
- Patron saint: St. Nicholas of Bari
- Saint day: 6 December
- Website: Official website

Zanica (Bergamasque: Sanga) is a comune (municipality) of around 8,804 inhabitants in the Province of Bergamo in the Italian region of Lombardy, located about 45 kilometres (28 mi) northeast of Milan and 7 kilometres (4 mi) south of Bergamo. Zanica borders the following municipalities: Azzano San Paolo, Cavernago, Comun Nuovo, Grassobbio, Orio al Serio, Stezzano, Urgnano.

Located at 210 m above sea level, the municipality was born on a flat territory, on the left of the Morla canal. The first official document citing Zanica as Vetianica dates back to 774. Now Zanica is an industrial and agricultural town, with some valuable buildings.

The municipality is also considered the home land of Gioppino, the most famous mask in the province of Bergamo.

== Physical geography ==
=== Territory ===
Zanica is located in a flat territory. The extension of the municipality is 14.66 km^{2}; around 10 km^{2} of them are used for agricultural or pasture reasons. The average altitude of Zanica is 210 m.

==== Hydrography ====
Zanica is crossed by the rivers Morla and Serio. The latter had a significant role in the agricultural development of the municipality: indeed, water canalization made many lands fertil. In particular, this process was carried out by the Romans, who realized a great reclamation work, which determined an increase in the number of fertile areas in the most gravelly territories situated in the East of Zanica.

== History ==
The Cenomani were the first population who occupied the territory of Zanica, followed by the Celts and the Etruscan. This historical reconstruction is confirmed by several relics, artifacts and graves, found in the municipality.

In 196 a.C. the Romans were peacefully ruling over Zanica and their presence is still evident nowadays. Lands disposal and rivers direction remind the so-called centurie romane, i.e. the division of the lands in squares pieces. Furthermore, the Cremasca road dates back to the Roman ages and it is still used to reach Bergamo and other towns in the South of the province.

=== Middle Ages ===
Barbarian invasions, together with food shortages and plagues, put an end to the previous period of peace and development. Then, the Ostrogoths and the Lombards occupied Zanica. At that time, the first official document mentioning Vetianica, the original name of the municipality, was written. It was Taidone's testament (774) which cited St Ambrose Church, located in Zanica.

Between the XII and the XIII centuries, a new channel of the river Serio was constructed. The so-called Seriola Nuova allowed the water transportation from Bergamo to the lands of Zanica, Levate and Verdello, two other municipalities nearby.

The fight between Guelphs and Ghibellines was converted in the conflict between two families: Colleoni and Suardi. Fighters destroyed some of Suardi's properties in the area of Zanica. When Bergamo was under Venice control (1428), Zanica was part of the quadra di mezza, the most populous of the various Venecian territorial division. The dominion of Venice was characterized by tension and struggles, above all for the fear of Visconti invasion.

=== Modern Age ===
Besides the Lansquenets invasion, starting from the 16th century, the French, the Austrians and the Spanish took, in turn, the control of Bergamo province. When the Venetians regained possession of the territory, a long period of peace and progress followed, except for the plague of 1630. In Zanica, the priest Cristoforo Capodiferro sacrificed his life to take care of sick people. The Venetians were pushed out in 1797 when the Republic of Bergamo was proclaimed, but it was short-lived.

=== Contemporary Age ===
At the beginning of the new century, Lombardy and Veneto were under the harsh Austrian rule, which, however, created the municipal schools in every town in the province of Bergamo. In 1859 the liberation from the Austrians was completed and the streets of Zanica saw the passage of the major Gabriele Camozzi. The political stability achieved was accompanied by the industrial development, which resulted in the creation of Cassa Rurale ed Artigiana di Zanica (1895).

Nowadays Zanica is characterized by the presence of small and medium-sized enterprises, in addition to the agricultural sector.

=== Symbols ===
The symbols of Zanica are the coat of arms and the Gonfalon, granted with D.P.R. May 17, 1989.

The blason for the coat of arms is the following:

Party: in the first one in red to the silver tower, walled in black, crenellated in the Guelph style of five, closed in black with a pointed door, this tower founded on the green countryside; in the second of blue, at the natural badger, still on the countryside banded with gold and red, accompanied on the head by the left horizontal sun, gold, equipped with two waving rays and one rays and two acute half-rays. Exterior ornaments from the Municipality.

— (Presidential Decree 17 May 1989)

Gonfalon blazon:

«Drape party of blue and red ...

— (Presidential Decree 17 May 1989)

== Attractions and points of interest ==
=== Religious buildings ===
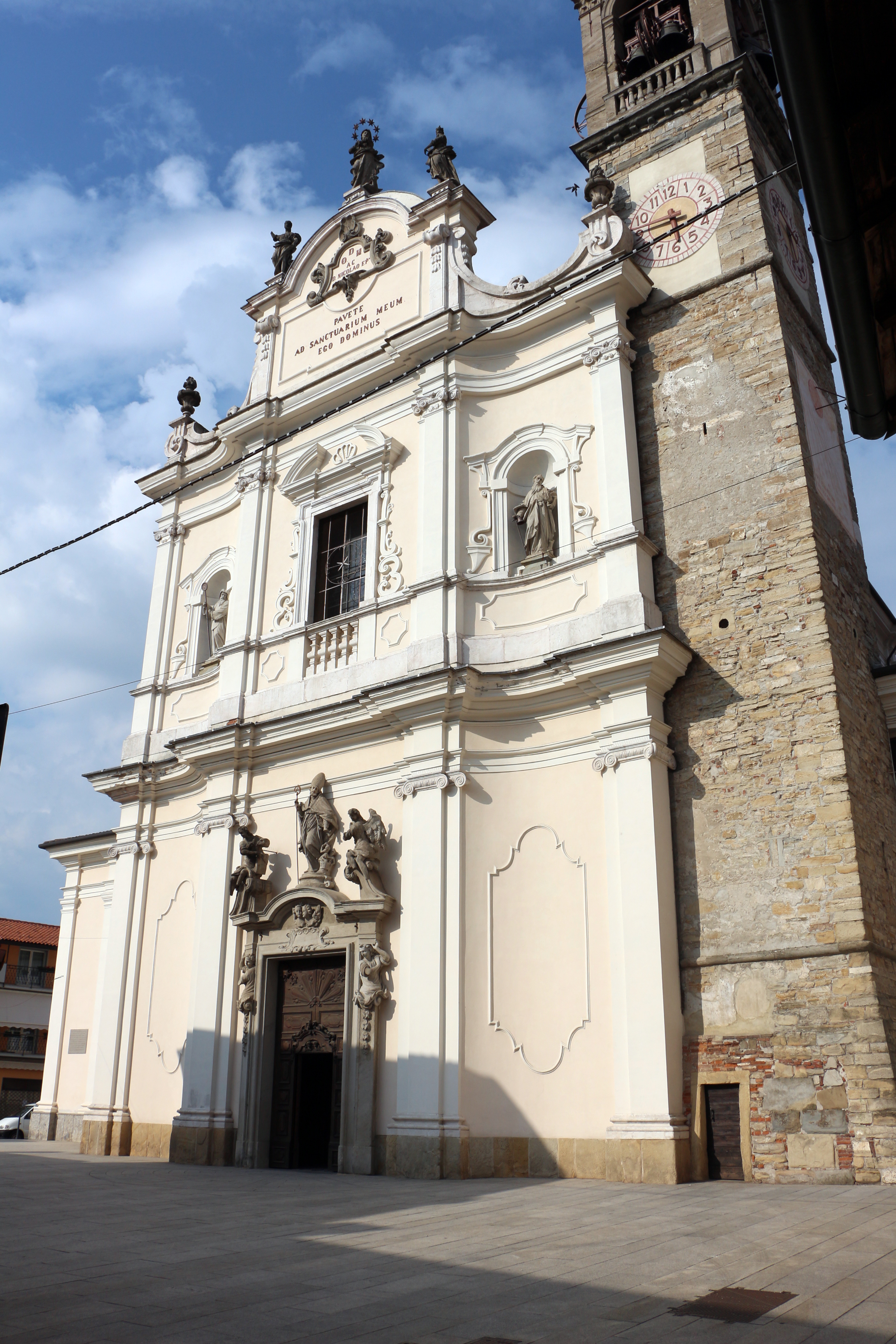
Parish Church St Nicholas Bishop

Parish Church St Nicholas Bishop

The first document attestin the existence of the Church dedicated to St Nicholas dates back to the 13th century. Recognized as a parish church from 1520, the church looks like a typical eighteenth-century architecture. Built on a project by the architect Giovan Battista Caniana, in 1742 it was opened to the public. The analysis of the architectural changes is difficult. At the end of the nineteenth century the church was expanded: indeed, two aisles were added.

The facade is noteworthy: "articulated in two superimposed orders, divided by a mighty cornice and enriched by the presence of numerous stone statues, created in 1738-39 by the sculptor Antonio Maria Pirovano". On one of the sides of the bell tower, the date 1533 was once engraved; however, nowadays it's no longer visible due to the deterioration of the slab. The interior is divided into three naves.

In the parish church there are paintings realized by Palma il Giovane, Sante Peranda, Jacopino De' Scipioni and Francesco Cavagna, the polyptych from the Marinoni's workshop and a wooden choir by Giuseppe Caniana. The presence of a seventeenth century Nativity, made by Gerard Van Honthorst, is also relevant.

Chapel of Beata Vergine dei Campi

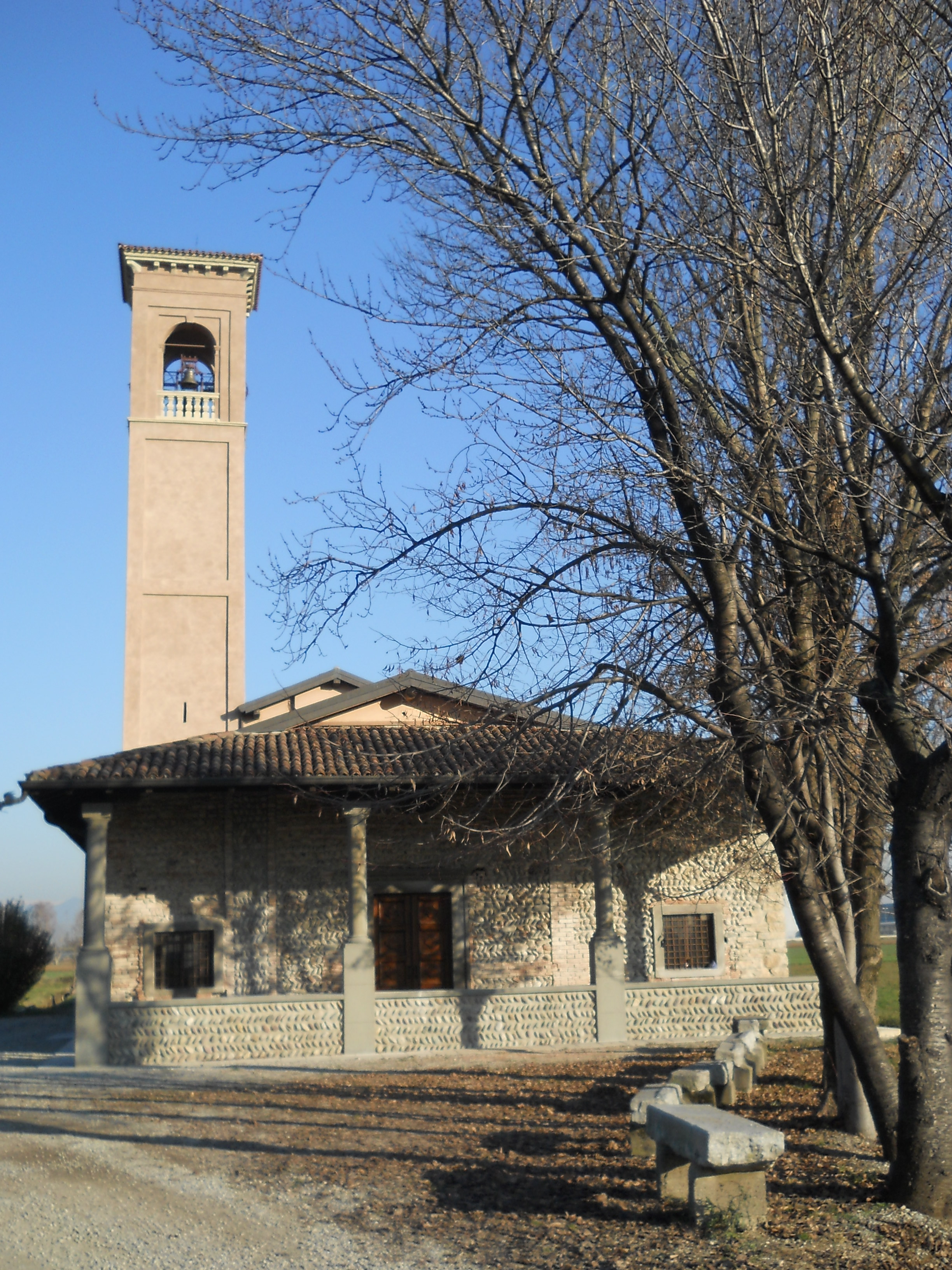
Zanica Madonna dei campi facciata

Better known as Madonna dei Campi, it can be admired in its sixteenth-century configuration. Inside there are Renaissance frescoes by Lucano da Imola.

San Joseph Church

Located in the Capannelle hamlet, it presents a concert of five bells.

Church dedicated to the Divine Maternity of Mary

Characterized by the presence of marble and noteworthy for its architecture, it's located in Padergnone.

=== Civil buildings ===
Town Hall Villa

The villa was built as the country house for the Milanese family of Spasciani in the early twentieth century. The villa is entirely surrounded by greenery: it has, in fact, eleven thousand square meters of park. The architectural style of the building is mixed, although the prevalence is the Liberty style. After years of great splendor, as the residence of exponents of high society, the villa went through a period of decline. Thanks to the decision to set some scenes of the Italian film Cuori Solitari in the villa, in 1969 it was recovered. The following year it was purchased, at a price of 32 million, by the municipality and became its headquarters.

Tasso's Villa

Built at the wish of Domenico Tasso in 1522, the building houses some frescoes depicting scenes from the poem Jerusalem Delivered, as evidence of Torquato Tasso's stay. The poet found shelter there after being freed from the prison of Ferrara in 1587. It was thanks to the peace of the Villa that Torquato Tasso was able to complete the finishing work on Il Torrismondo. The Villa then passed into the hands of the Varese counts of Rosate and subsequently to the Handmaids of Charity. The building is surrounded by greenery, while Baroque-style paintings and other art pieces by Palma stands out. Now it is the seat of the Zanica kindergarten.

Bono Palace

A seventeenth-century building, it is still in excellent condition and contains frescoes from the eighteenth century. It is located in the center of Zanica and is the seat of the oratory.

Padergnone Castle

Constructed during the sixteenth century, the castle has a strong symbolic value for Zanica, as the crenellated tower of the castle is represented in the coat of arms of the municipality, now it's privately owned.

Padergnone Villa

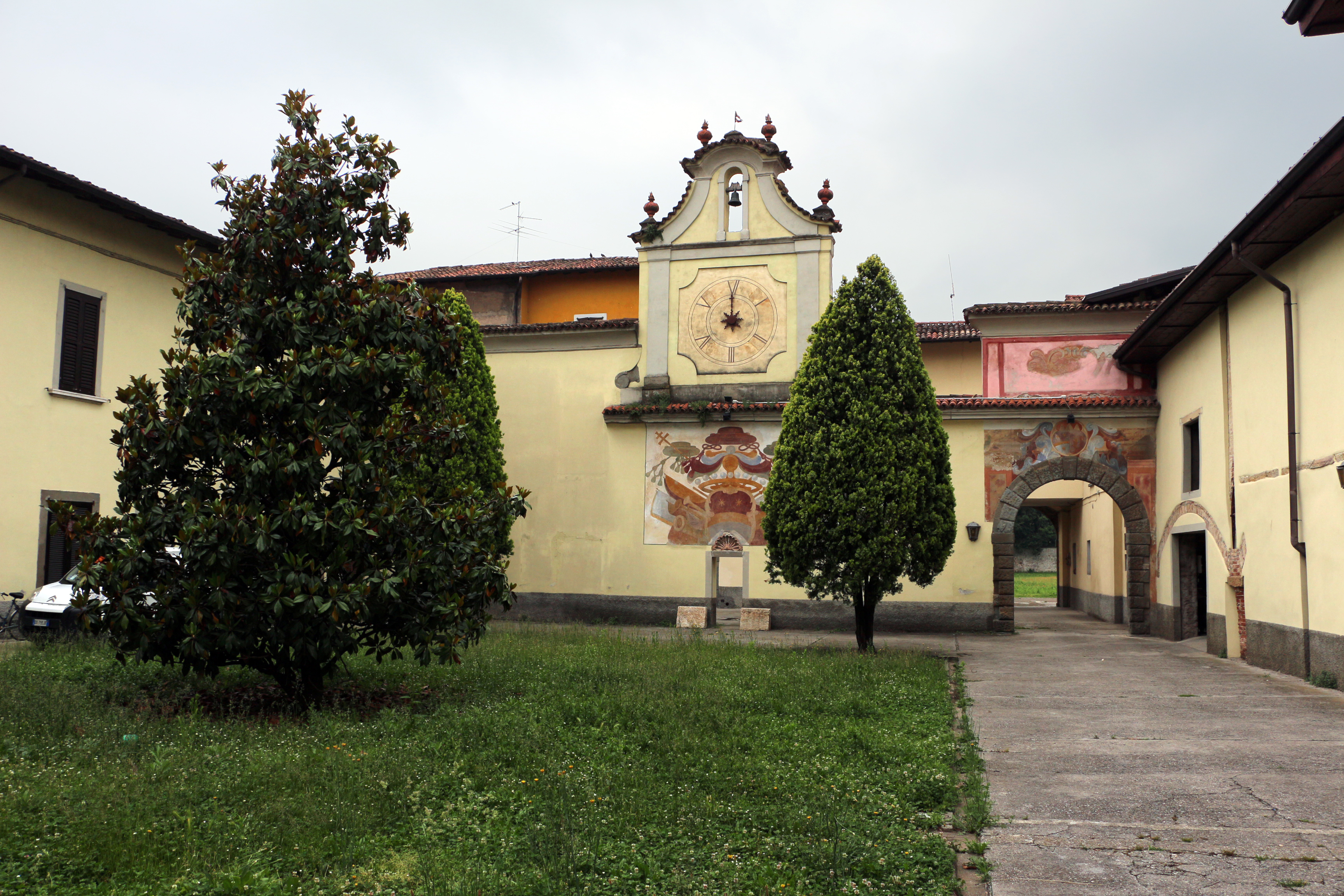
Padergnone Villa

The villa, dating back to the seventeenth century, is characterized by the presence of a large garden, grotesque statues, typical of the end of the '700, frescoes and a large clock. The site is also the subject of several legendary stories connected with the existence of some underground walkways that led up to Cavernago and Malpaga and which are the home of spirits and ghosts. Furthermore, the villa, when it was the holiday house of Cardinal Sonzogni, hosted Gaetano Donizetti, who remembered the stay as an authentic moment of regeneration. Now it's privately owned.

=== Natural areas ===
Parco agricolo del Rio Morla e delle rogge

Zanica is located on the left bank of the Morla canal. Since the 1990s, the municipalities of Zanica, Comun Nuovo and Levate and their respective citizens have promoted the creation of the Rio Morla and canals agricultural park, which is officially recognized by the Province in 2004. The park was created with three specific objectives: knowledge of the natural areas of the territory, promote its use and support agriculture. Zanica is included in the PLIS which aims to protect both the course of the Morla river and the canals that make up the intricate irrigation system of the countryside, and the rural environments present.

Parco del Serio

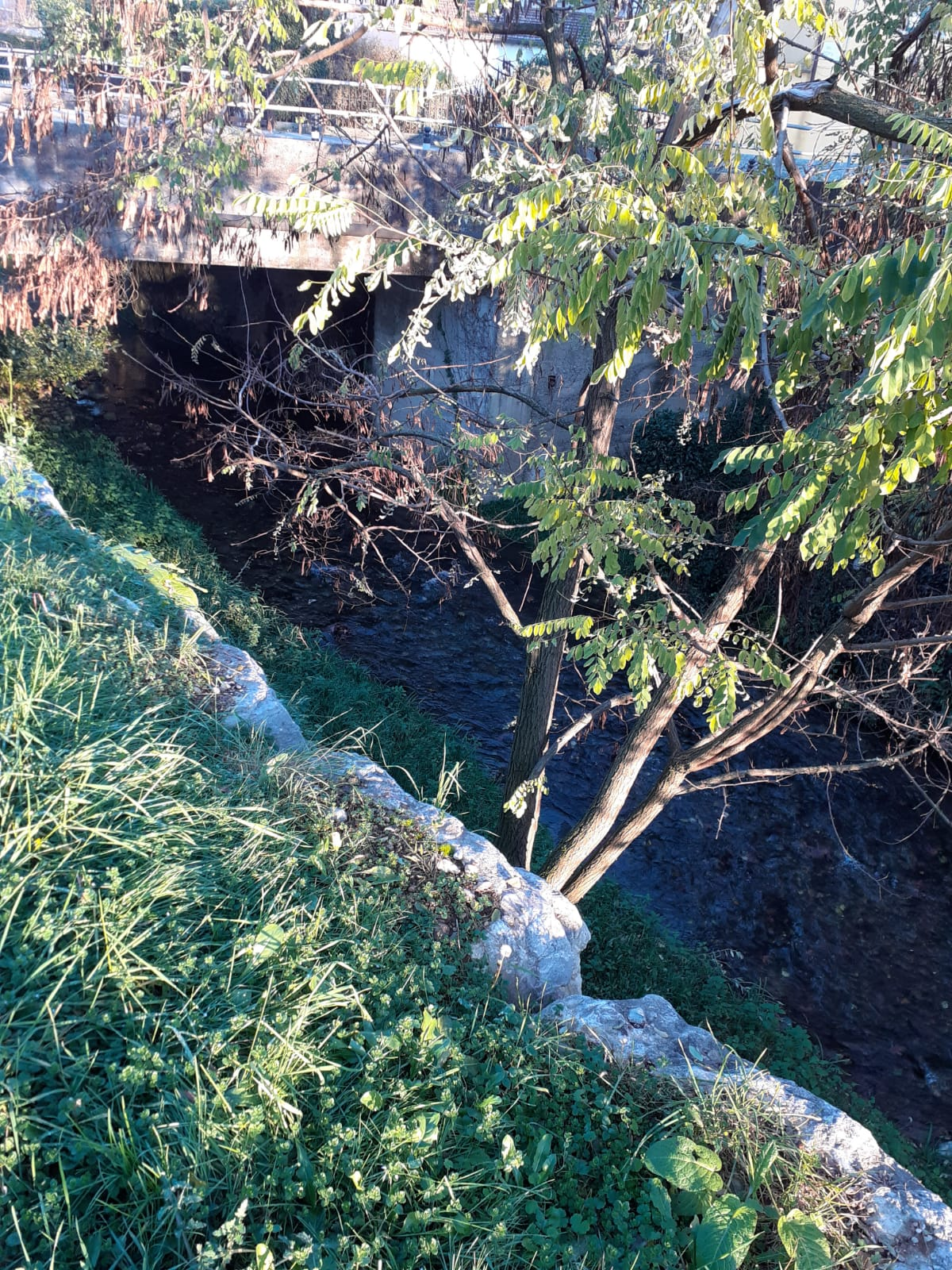
The river Morla in Zanica

Zanica is one of the municipalities included in the Serio River Park area. The municipality is part of the so-called Community of the Park, whose objectives include: the management and protection of the same and the promotion of sustainable tourism through the creation of pedestrian and cycle paths within the park.

== Infrastructures and transport ==
=== Streets ===
The highway 591 Cremasca (SS 591) connects Zanica with Bergamo, Piacenza and Crema; whereas the provincial road (SP 120) is the main axis connecting Zanica with the east and the west of the area.

=== Urban transport ===
Urban transport is managed by SAB and includes one bus line which connects Zanica with Bergamo, Azzano San Paolo and other towns located south of Zanica.

== Bibliography ==
- Gianmario Colombo, Silvana Milesi, Un paese per viverci, Corponove Editrice, 1984.
- Alessandra Di Gennaro, Zanica: arte e storia nella Parrocchiale XVI-XVII secolo, Corponove Editrice, 2004, ISBN 9788887831382.
- Renato Ravanelli, Giorgio Gavazzi, La Bergamasca in pianura, Grafica e Arte Bergamo, 1983.
