= Politecnico delle Arti di Bergamo =

Conservatory in Bergamo, Italy

The Politecnico delle Arti di Bergamo is a conservatory for the arts in Bergamo, Italy. It was formed in January 2023 with the merger of the Bergamo Conservatory and the Accademia Carrara.
