= Civico Istituto Musicale =

The Civico Istituto Musicale may refer to:

- A former name of the Bergamo Conservatory
- A former name of the Genoa Conservatory
