= Grassobbio =

- Comune
- Comune di Grassobbio
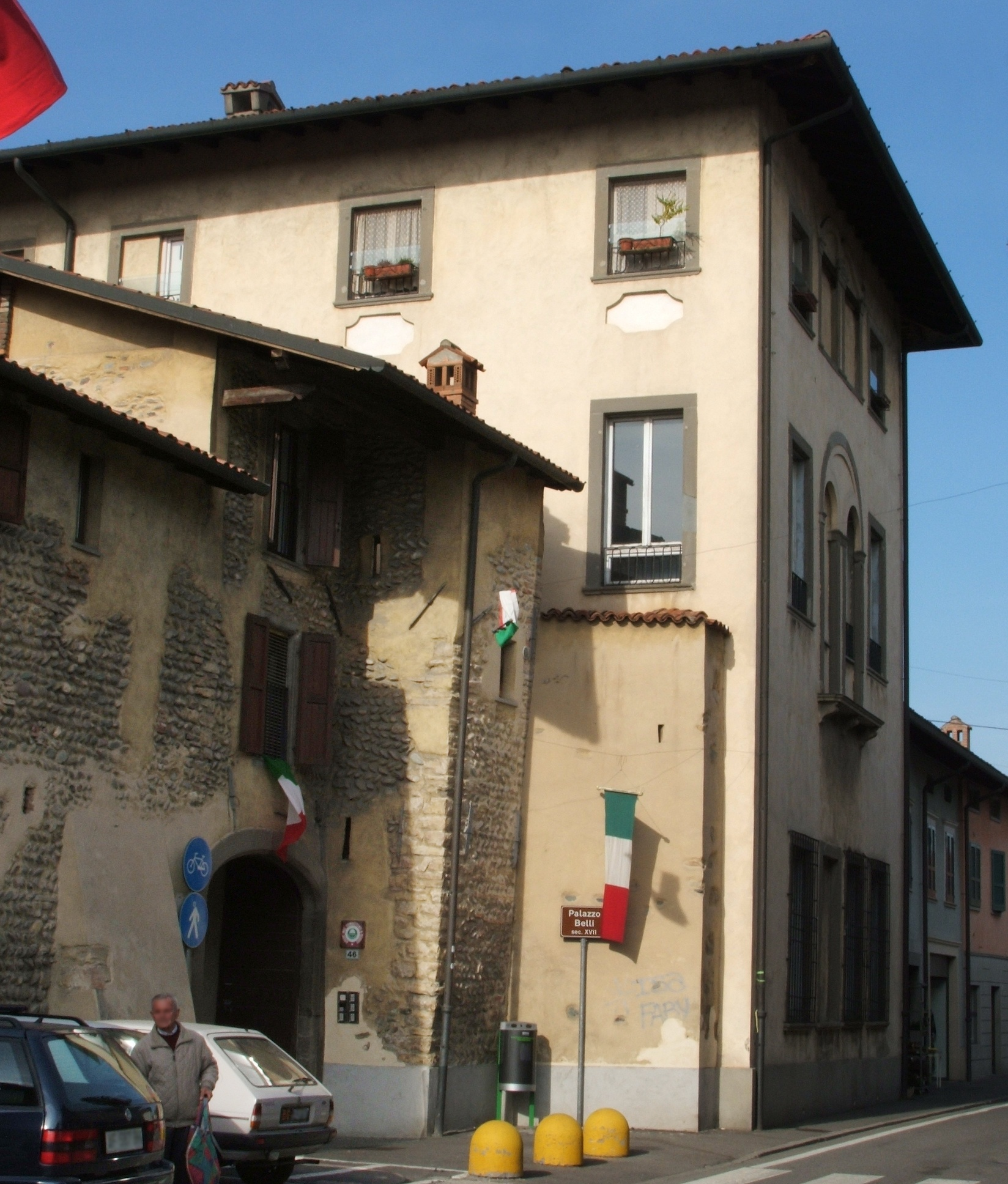
- Belli Palace

- Location of Grassobbio in Italy Grassobbio (Lombardy)
- Coordinates: 45°39′N 9°43′E
- Country: Italy
- Region: Lombardy
- Province: Bergamo (BG)

Government
  - Mayor: Manuel Bentoglio (Lega Salvini)

Area
  - Total: 8.74 km^{2} (3.37 sq mi)
- Elevation: 225 m (738 ft)

Population (31 December 2019)http://demo.istat.it/bilmens2019gen/index.html
  - Total: 6,487
  - Density: 742/km^{2} (1,920/sq mi)
- Demonym: Grassobbiesi
- Time zone: UTC+1 (CET)
  - Summer (DST): UTC+2 (CEST)
- Postal code: 24050
- Dialing code: 035
- ISTAT code: 016117
- Patron saint: St. Alexander
- Saint day: 26 August
- Website: Official website

Grassobbio (Bergamasque: Grahòbe or Grassòbe) is a municipality (comune) in the Province of Bergamo, which consists of 6487 inhabitants, in the Italian region of Lombardy. Grassobbio is located in the orographical right side of Serio river and around 8.5km from the main city of Bergamo.

Grassobbio borders the following municipalities: Cavernago, Orio al Serio, Seriate, Zanica.

== Economy ==
In the mid 70’s, the now multinational chemical manufacturer Sigma Chemicals Company built its second plant in Grassobbio, after starting in Mozzo.
