= Azzano San Paolo =

- Comune
- Comune di Azzano San Paolo
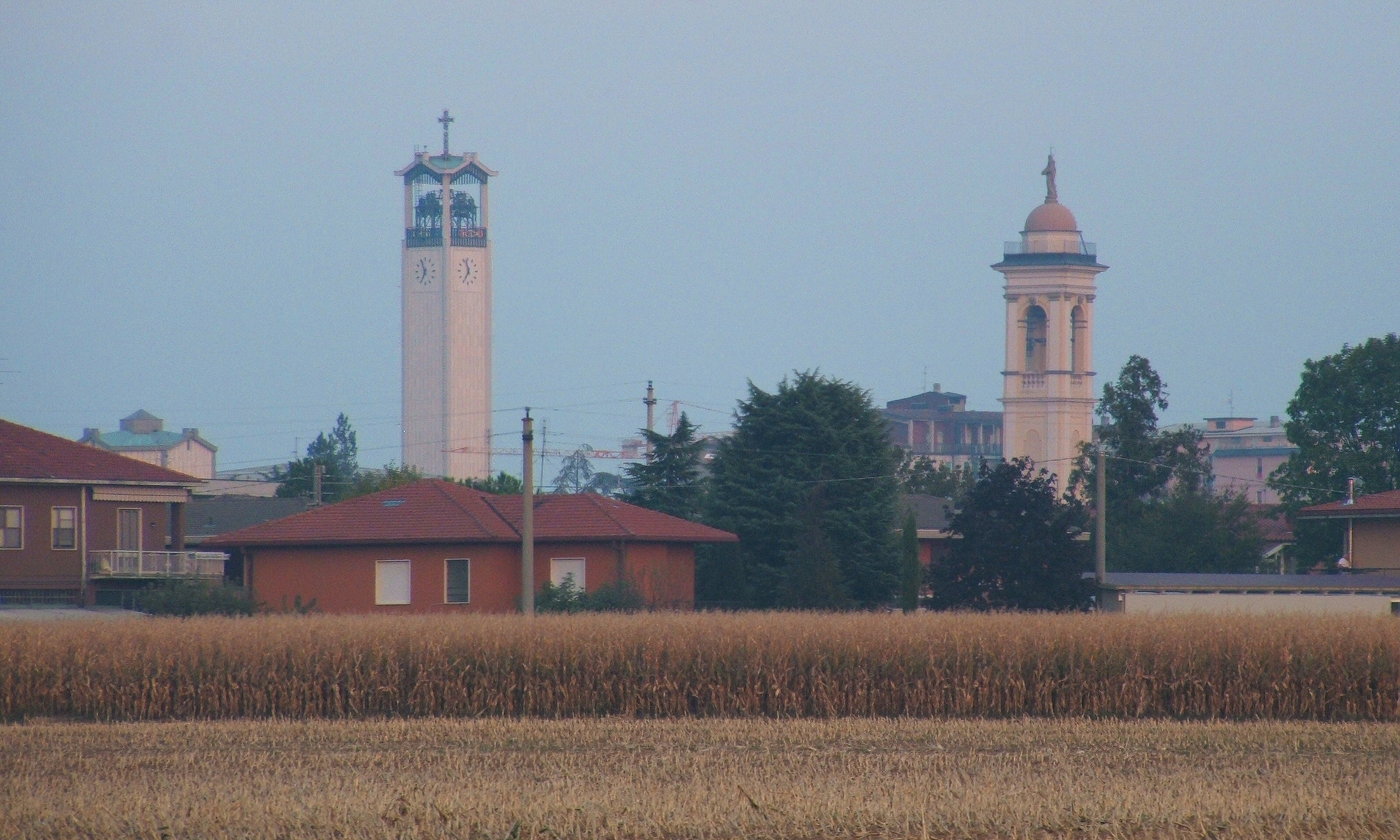
- View of Azzano San Paolo

- Coat of arms

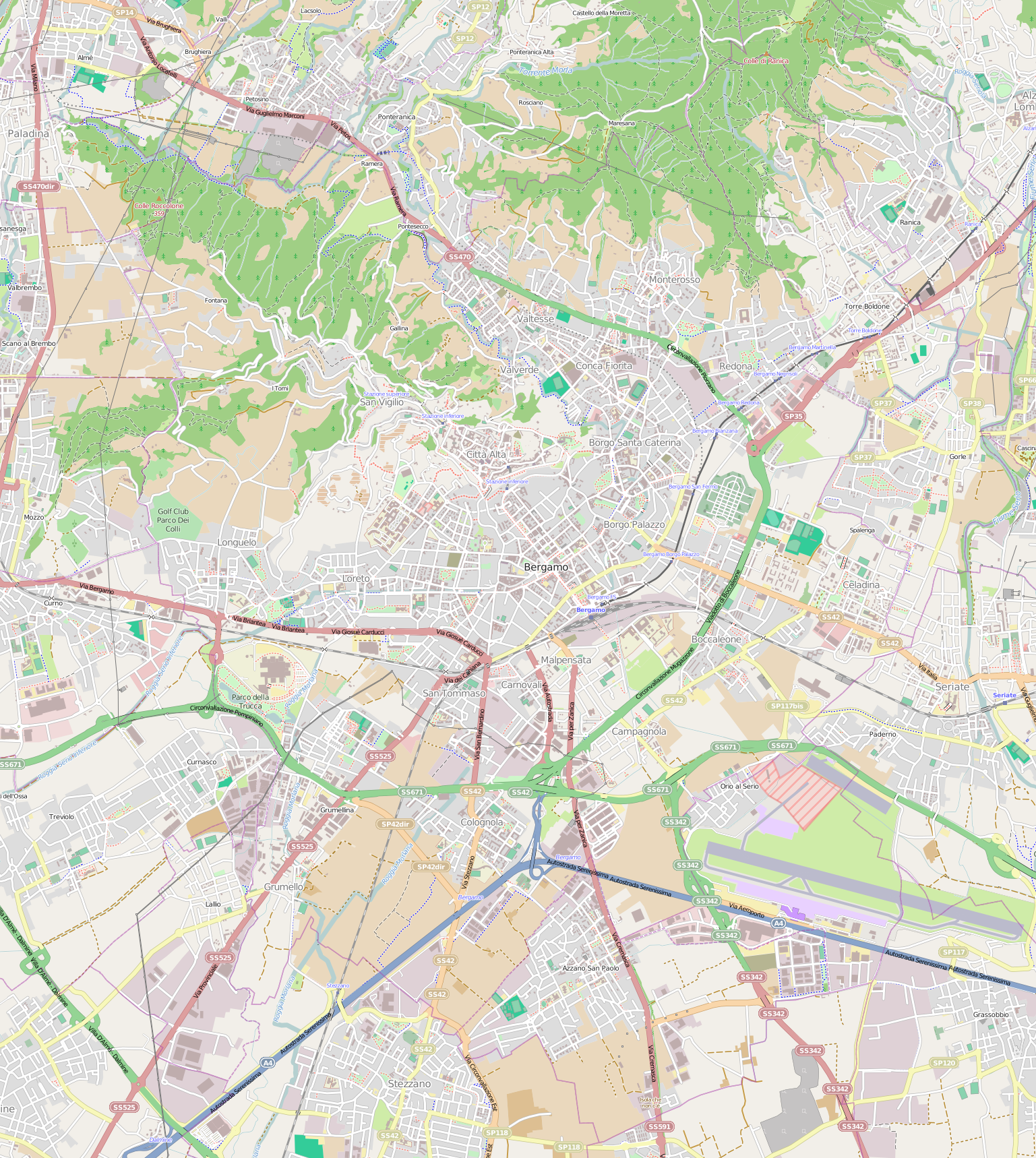
- Location within Italy Location within Bergamo
- Coordinates: 45°40′N 09°40′E
- Country: Italy
- Region: Bergamo
- Province: Bergamo (BG)

Government
  - Mayor: Simona Pergreffi (since June 7, 2009)

Area
  - Total: 4.21 km^{2} (1.63 sq mi)
- Elevation: 211 m (692 ft)

Population (30 April 2017)
  - Total: 7,573
  - Density: 1,800/km^{2} (4,660/sq mi)
- Demonym: Azzanesi
- Time zone: UTC+1 (CET)
  - Summer (DST): UTC+2 (CEST)
- Postal code: 24052
- Dialing code: 035
- Patron saint: St. Paul
- Website: Official website

Azzano San Paolo (Bergamasque: Sà) is a comune in the province of Bergamo, in Lombardy, northern Italy.

== History ==
The origins date back to Roman times and the place-name, according to many experts, comes from a landowner of that historical period named Attius.

The place was first mentioned in 875, referring to a certain Agemundi de Aciano. The area was ruled by the Lombards and after them the Holy Roman Empire. During the communal period, the village was affected by significant clashes between opposing factions of the Guelphs and Ghibellines. Because of its proximity to the city Bergamo, numerous fortifications for defensive purposes, such as towers and a castle, were built.

In 1083 Count Albert, son of Arduin Glaber, allowed the serfs to own homes, lands and any kind of good. This event, reported by official documents, anticipated by almost seven centuries the democratic achievements towards the slaves, occurred in Europe only since the 18th century.

Azzano was subsequently ruled by the Republic of Venice, the Cisalpine Republic and the Austrian Empire. In 1859 it was annexed into the Kingdom of Italy.

In 1896 it was founded here a convent of Dominican nuns coming from the monastery of Matris Domini in Bergamo, adapting an old country house and a textile mill previously owned by the counts Morlani.

Traditionally a small farming village on the outskirts of Bergamo, it maintained its agricultural vocation until the end of World War II. With the Italian industrialization process of the 1960s and 1970s, the hamlet's economy diversified, the population tripling since then. The expansion process is still ongoing because the proximity to Bergamo makes it a suitable area new settlements.

== Neighbouring comuni ==
- Bergamo
- Orio al Serio
- Stezzano
- Zanica
