= Seriate =

- Comune
- Città di Seriate
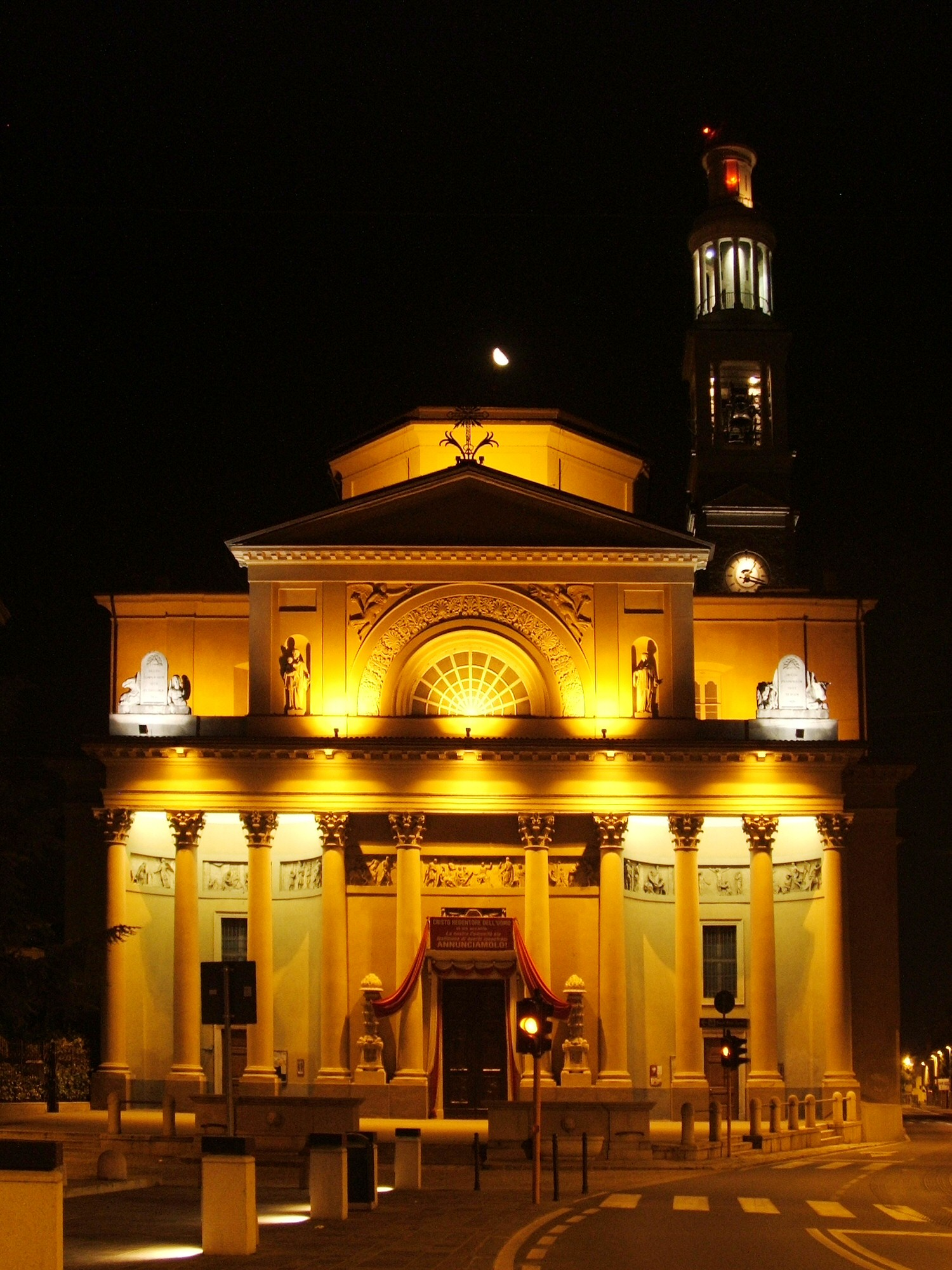
- Parish church by night

- Coat of arms

- Location within Italy Location within Lombardy
- Coordinates: 45°41′N 9°43′E
- Country: Italy
- Region: Lombardy
- Province: Province of Bergamo (BG)
- Frazioni: Comonte, Cassinone

Area
  - Total: 12.41 km^{2} (4.79 sq mi)
- Elevation: 247 m (810 ft)

Population (June 2012)
  - Total: 25,036
  - Density: 2,017/km^{2} (5,225/sq mi)
- Demonym: Seriatesi
- Time zone: UTC+1 (CET)
  - Summer (DST): UTC+2 (CEST)
- Postal code: 24068
- Dialing code: 035
- Website: Official website

Seriate (Italian pronunciation: [seˈrjaːte] Bergamasque: Seriàt [seˈrjaːt] ) is a comune (municipality) in the Province of Bergamo in the Italian region of Lombardy, located about 50 kilometres (31 mi) northeast of Milan and about 4 kilometres (2 mi) southeast of Bergamo. As of 31 August 2020, it had a population of 25,200 and an area of 12.4 square kilometres (4.8 mi^{2}).

Seriate borders the following municipalities: Albano Sant'Alessandro, Bagnatica, Bergamo, Brusaporto, Calcinate, Cavernago, Gorle, Grassobbio, Orio al Serio, Pedrengo. Seriate received the honorary title of city with a presidential decree on October 2, 1989.

== Toponym ==
The name "Sariate" appears for the first time in a parchment from the year 949. There are two theories about the origin of the name. Some state that it derives from "Sarius", the ancient Latin name of the river Serio. Others claim that it derives from the typical Gallo-Ligurian idiom that characterizes all places near a river, with the ending -ate (Brembate, Locate, Capriate, Seriate ...).

== Political geography ==
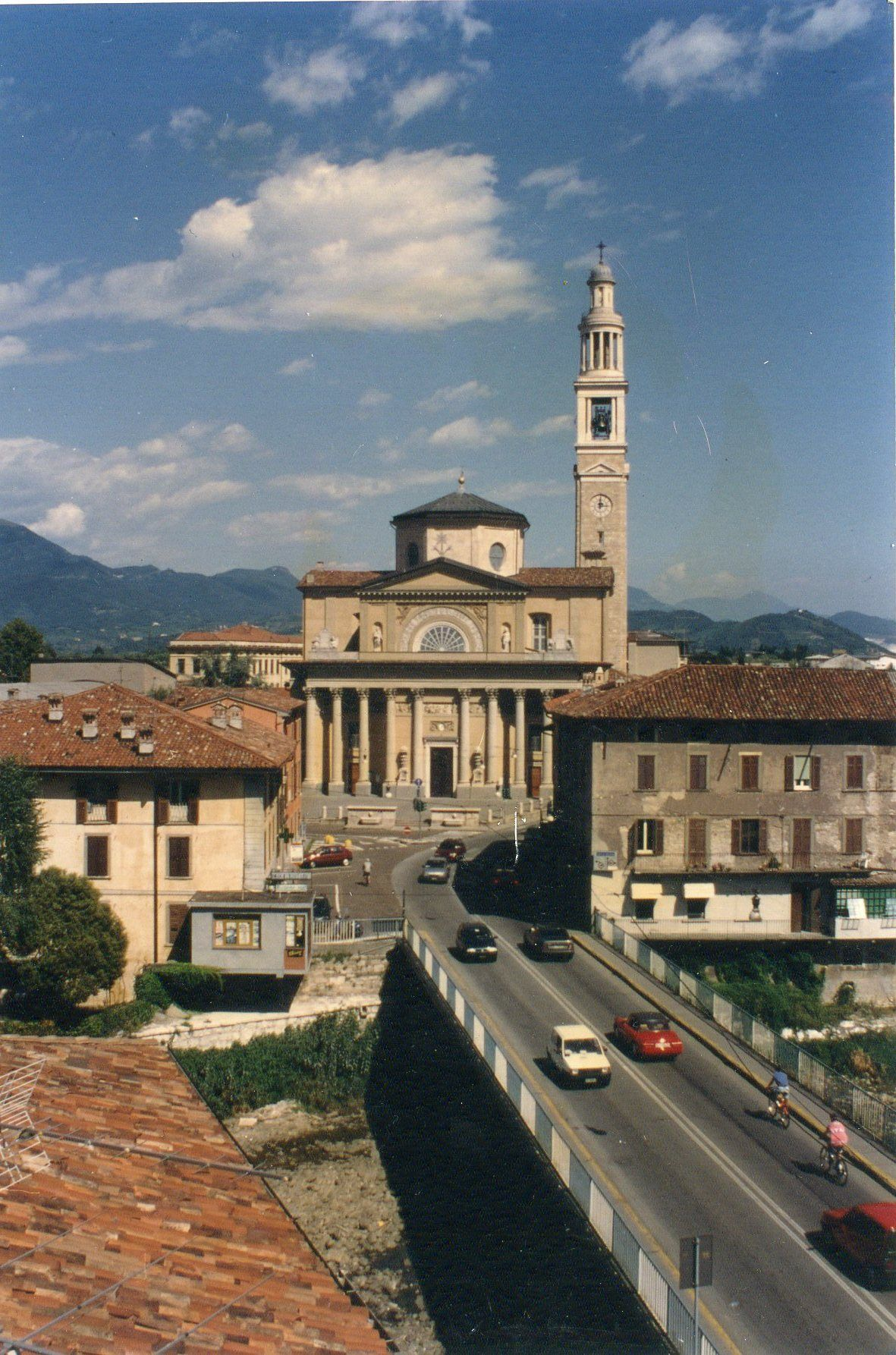
Landscape of Seriate

The city of Seriate is located at the end of “Via Borgo Palazzo” of Bergamo, in the direction towards the river Serio. The territory of Seriate occupies an area of 12.41 sq km, largely located along the banks of the Serio river, which runs through the city from north to south. The river contributed in both linking and dividing the two banks, in fact sometimes it is an element of mediation while other times it's an obstacle. The river influences various functions of the urban space, such as roads, living quarters and workplaces.

The municipality of Seriate contains the two frazioni (subdivisions, mainly villages and hamlets) of Comonte and Cassinone.

=== Paderno ===
The area of Paderno lays in the Western part of the Municipality of Seriate. The origin of the word “paderno” could be the adjective “paternus”, which refers to a land inherited from the father. The first written text that mention this area is a document of 979. It is possible that the first settlements of Seriate were in the area of Paderno. In fact the current “Via Paderno” is near the river “Serio”, but it’s still safe in case of possible floods. This hypothesis could be confirmed by the ruins of necropolis and hydro cistern, which date back to II and IV centuries. In the sixteenth century the area of Paderno was so important that was mentioned in the maps of cartographers. The first commercial activities started during the 1960s.

=== Comonte ===
The "frazione" of Comonte is located in the north-eastern quadrant of the municipal area. Comonte is situated on a 277 meters hill. Geologically Comonte is the most antique part of Seriate.

=== Cassinone ===
The "frazione"of Cassinone is located in the south of the city of Seriate. Cassinone belongs to three municipalities: Seriate, Calcinate and Bagnatica. This "frazione" is a rural location which has an industrial and artisan area.

== Physical geography ==
The river Serio has always had an important role in the city and numerous artificial waterways were created. Seriate lays in a strategic geographic position because of the important presence of the river. The river Serio runs through the province of Bergamo and it's linked with life and economy of the province.

== Main sights ==
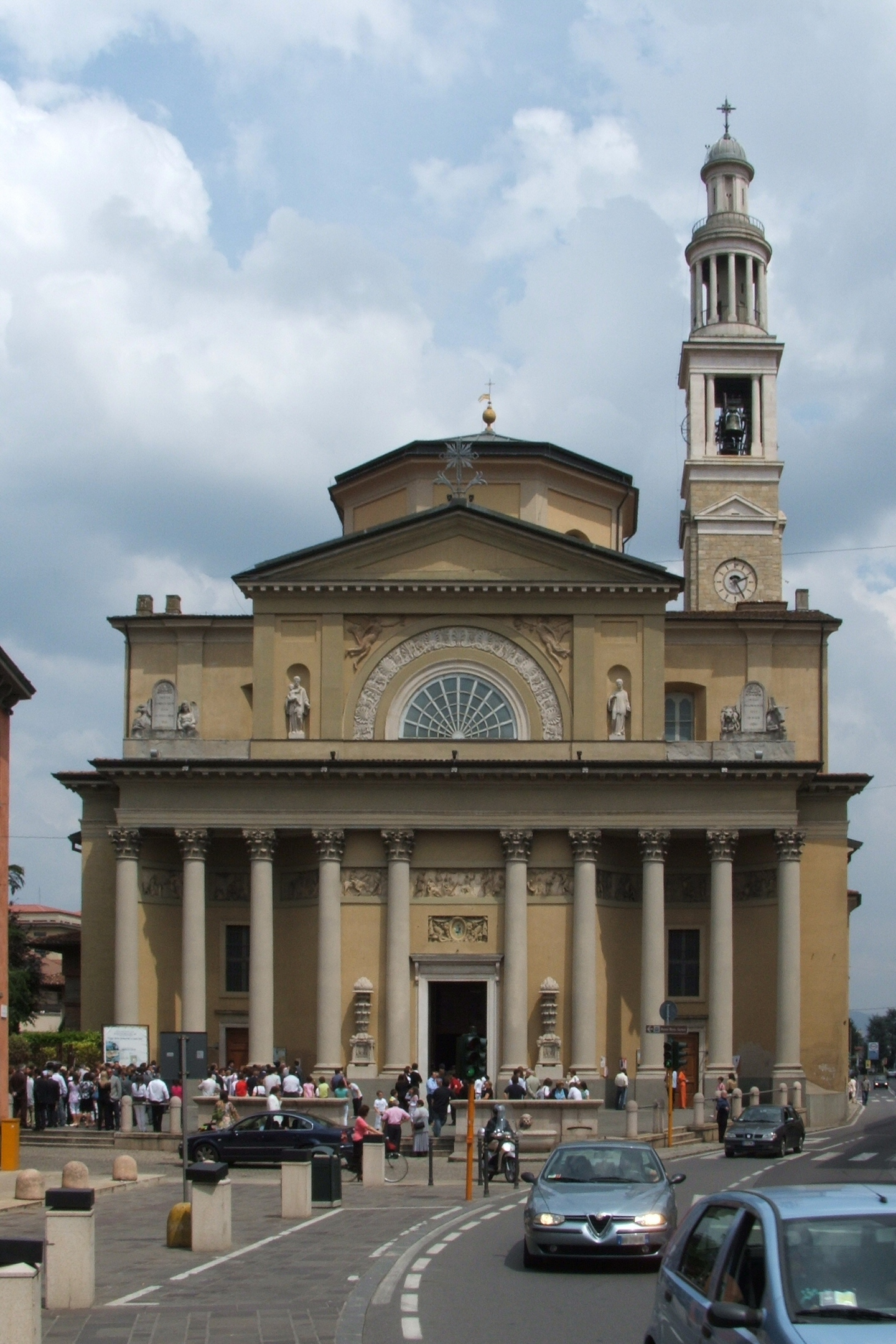
Church "Parrocchia del SS. Redentore"

=== Church “Parrocchia del SS. Rendentore” and its Tower Bell ===
The Church is situated on the left side of the river Serio. The main structure was built between 1769 and 1778. The “Parrocchia del SS. Rendentore” was sanctified in 1808 by the Bishop Gian Paolo Dolfin. The project to build the façade, made by architect Berlendis, was approved in 1832. Inside the building there are a lot of elegant decorations, typical of the 1700s. The architectonic plan of the Church presents a Greek cross, that creates perfect harmony, and a raised presbytery. In 1937 and 1938 a part of the Church was destroyed and the Tower Bell was built.

=== Sanctuary “Madonna del Buon Consiglio” ===
The façade of the Sanctuary presents a little and harmonious tripartite colonnade with two pillars. Also the top of the façade is divided in three parts and in the central one there is a window. The Church has just one aisle and there are two memorials to remember the benefactors of the Sanctuary and the men of Seriate who died during the First and Second World War. Inside the Sanctuary there are many religious pictures, for example on the ceiling there are three paintings describing the miracles of resurrection made by Jesus.

=== Church “Sant'Alessandro Martire a Paderno” ===
The first written document that mention the presence of this church was written in 1223, therefore it is possible to know that the church already existed in the beginnings of the XIII century. It is not clear when and why the church was dedicated to S. Alessandro. It is possible that the inhabitants of Seriate that died because of plague in 1630 were buried in the cemetery of this church. In 1977 and 1978 it was made a restoration of the building. Nowadays the façade has a baroque style. In the upper part of the façade there is a central window and two statues on the sides, while the portico has five arcades. The inside of the church is characterized by a Latin cross and one aisle. On the right side there is an altar dedicated to S. Mary, while in the left side there is an altar representing Jesus crucified. From the left side of the building one can enter in a little chapel dedicated to the people who died because of the plague.

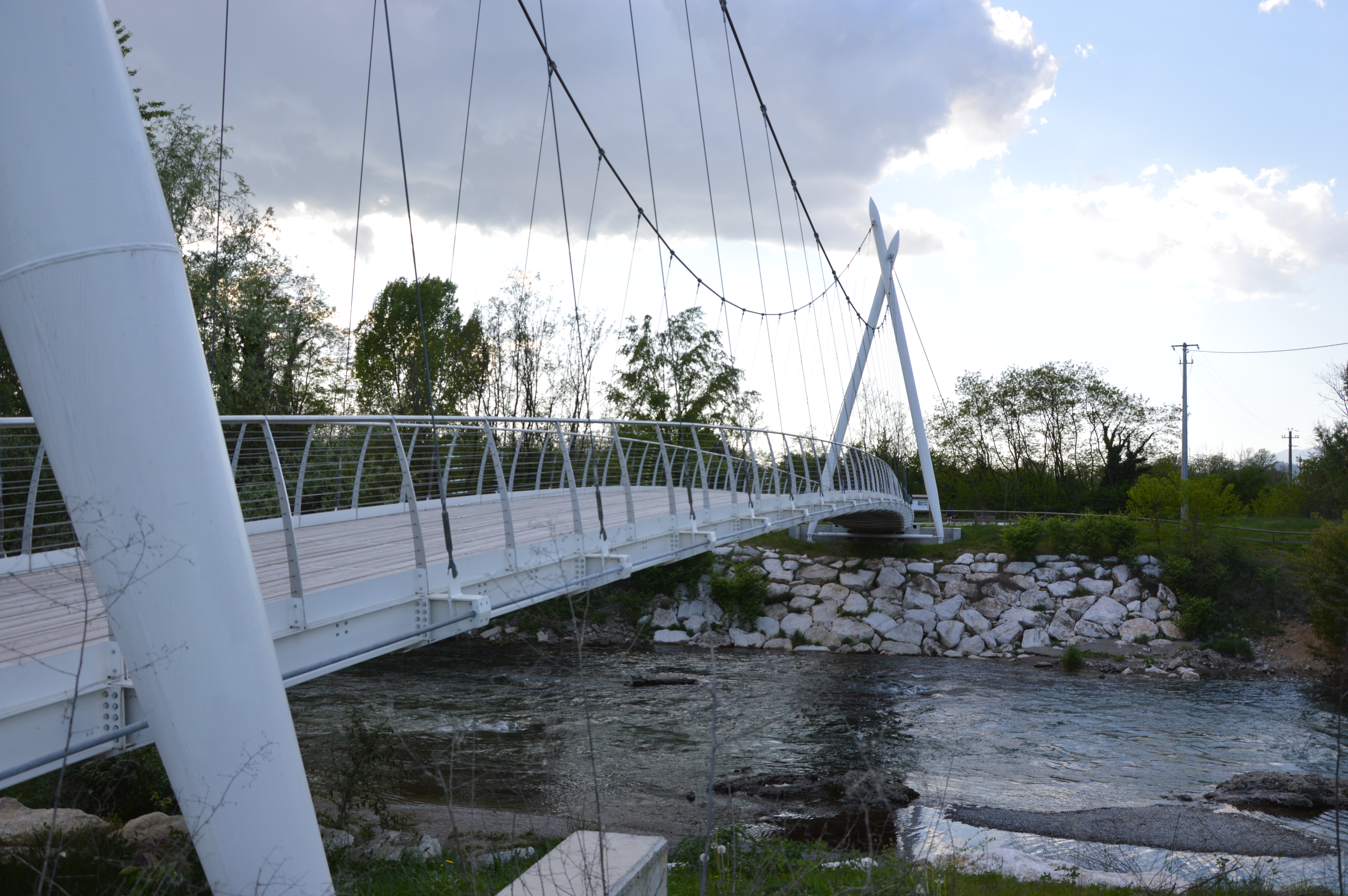
Bridge that links the parks "Oasi verde 1" to "Oasi verde 2"

=== Naturalistic itineraries ===
The Serio Regional Park occupies an area of 7,750 hectares, it was created in 1985 and it is managed by a consortium.

The Serio Nord Local Park of Supracommunal Interest was recognized in 2006 and its surface is about 157.55 hectares. It includes not only a part of the city of Seriate, but also the areas of the municipalities of Gorle, Pedrengo, Scanzorosciate and Villa di Serio. Among the main objectives of the creation of the Park are the enhancement and protection of the river and agricultural environment and the creation of eco-compatible spaces.

== Society ==
From a simple observation of the municipal demographic data, it is possible to note that 60% of the population of Seriate comes from outside the Municipality of Seriate. Most of this 60% is made up of citizens from mountain areas in the province of Bergamo and the capital of the province.

=== Demographic evolution ===
Historical population

Year	Pop.	±%
1861	2,466	—
1871	2,934	+19.0%
1881	3,369	+14.8%
1901	4,245	+26.0%
1911	5,873	+38.4%

Year	Pop.	±%
1921	6,586	+12.1%
1931	7,727	+17.3%
1936	8,085	+4.6%
1951	9,967	+23.3%
1961	12,339	+23.8%

Year	Pop.	±%
1971	16,276	+31.9%
1981	18,018	+10.7%
1991	19,030	+5.6%
2001	20,320	+6.8%

Source: Data from ISTAT

== Infrastructure and accessibility ==
The most relevant infrastructure of Seriate are the motorway A 4, that had improved accessibility to Seriate and its link to Bergamo, the trainline Milan-Brescia, which connects Seriate with the region Lombardia, and the interurban axis, which created further connections among Seriate and the Province of Bergamo.
