= Cavernago =

Cavernago Caernàch (Lombard)
- Comune
- Comune di Cavernago
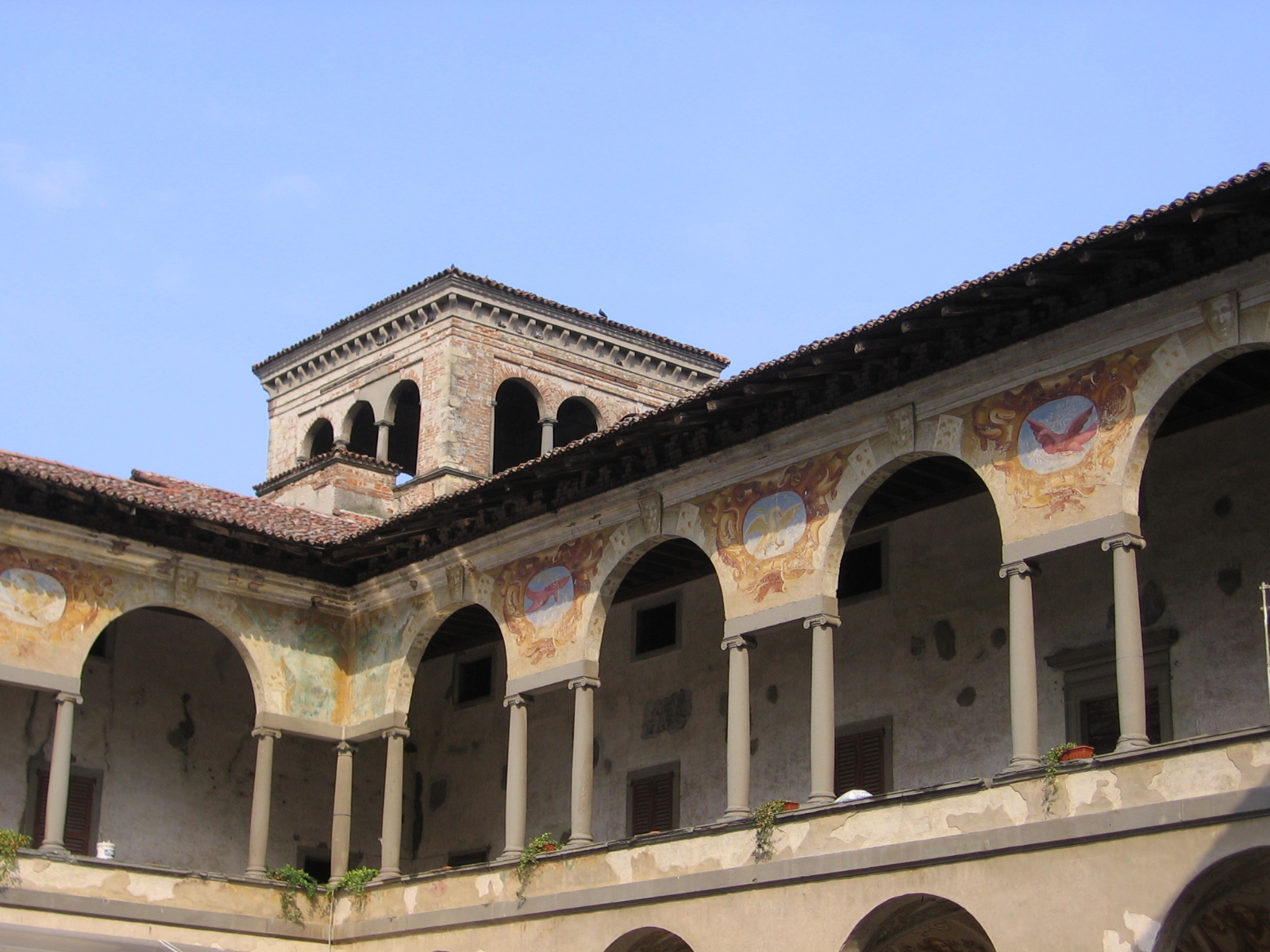
- Interior of the Castle of Cavernago.

- Coat of arms

- Location within Italy Location within Lombardy
- Coordinates: 45°38′N 9°46′E
- Country: Italy
- Region: Lombardy
- Province: Bergamo (BG)
- Frazioni: Malpaga

Government
  - Mayor: Giuseppe Togni

Area
  - Total: 7.65 km^{2} (2.95 sq mi)
- Elevation: 199 m (653 ft)

Population (30 April 2017)
  - Total: 2,590
  - Density: 339/km^{2} (877/sq mi)
- Demonym: Cavernaghesi
- Time zone: UTC+1 (CET)
  - Summer (DST): UTC+2 (CEST)
- Postal code: 24050
- Dialing code: 035
- Website: Official website

Cavernago (Bergamasque: Caernàch) is a comune (municipality) in the Province of Bergamo in the Italian region of Lombardy, located about 50 kilometres (31 mi) northeast of Milan and about 11 kilometres (7 mi) southeast of Bergamo.

Cavernago borders the municipalities of Calcinate, Ghisalba, Grassobbio, Seriate, Urgnano, and Zanica. It is home to the Malpaga Castle, a Renaissance fortress owned by the condottiero and local lord Bartolomeo Colleoni. Another castle, that of Cavernago proper, was later remade in the 17th century in Baroque style.
