= Bergamo Cathedral =

Roman Catholic cathedral in Bergamo, Italy

Coordinates: 45°42′12″N 9°39′47″E

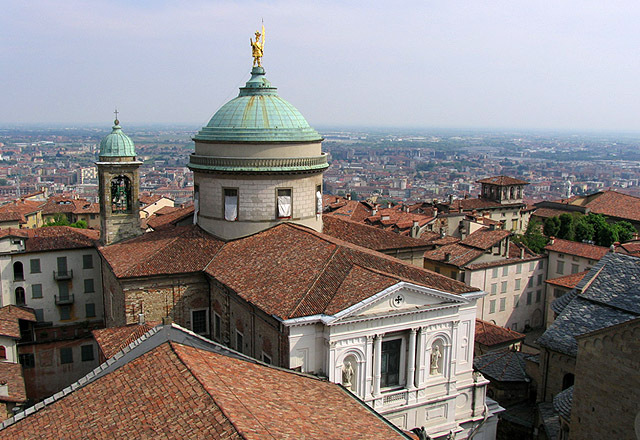
Bergamo Cathedral, Neo-classical west front

Bergamo Cathedral (Italian: Duomo di Bergamo, Cattedrale di Sant'Alessandro) is a Roman Catholic cathedral in Bergamo, Italy, dedicated to Saint Alexander of Bergamo, patron saint of the city. It is the seat of the Bishop of Bergamo.

== History ==
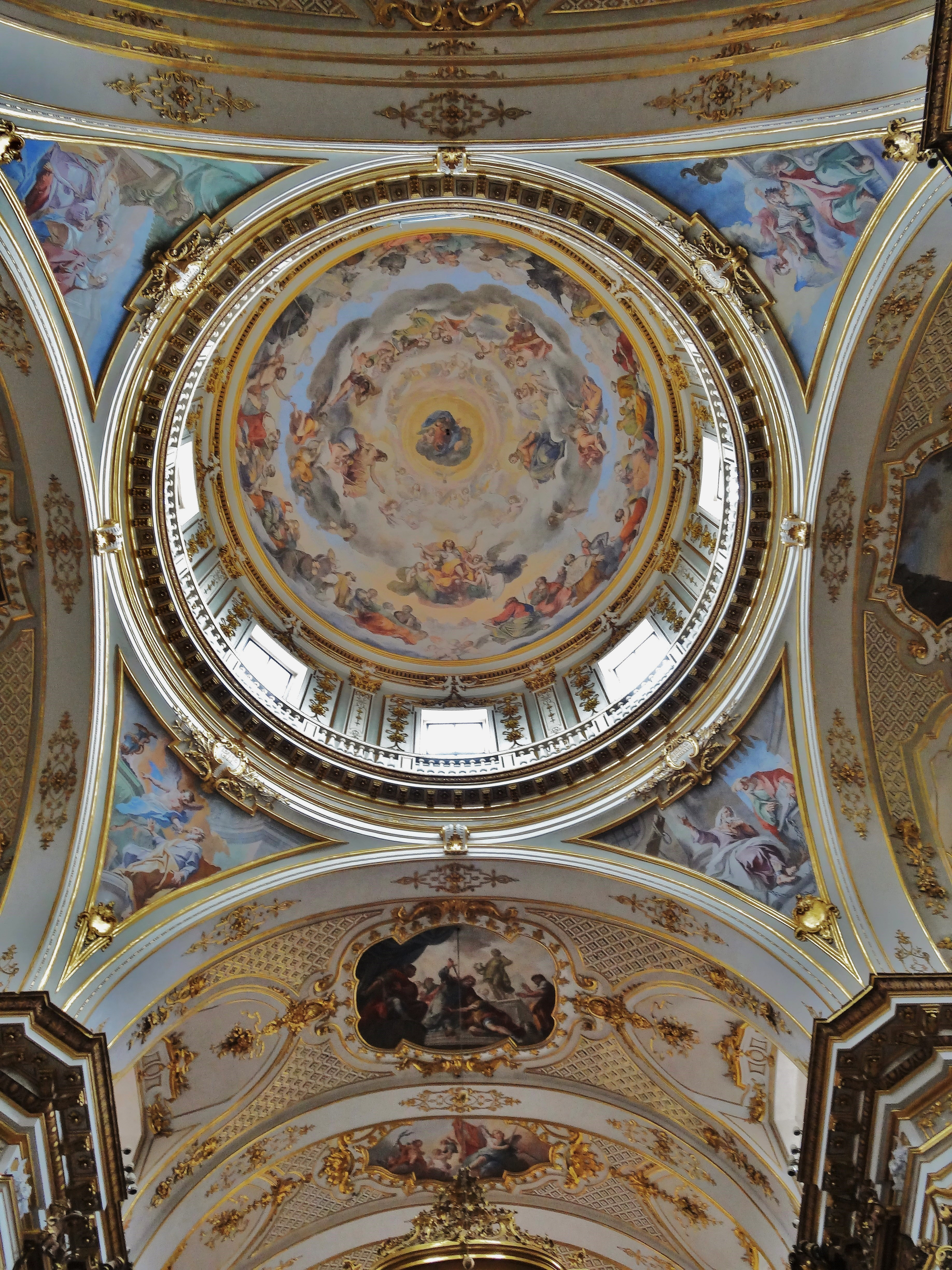
The dome

From no later than the 9th century there were two cathedrals in Bergamo: one was the basilica of Saint Alexander, which stood on the site believed to be that of his martyrdom, and the other was dedicated to Saint Vincent, construction of which apparently began in the Lombard era, on the site of the present cathedral. Bishop Giovanni Barozzi commissioned the re-building of the cathedral of St. Vincent in the mid-15th century, for the plans of which Filarete claimed credit.

In 1561 the Venetians demolished the cathedral of St. Alexander for reasons of military expediency, leaving St. Vincent's as the sole survivor. At the beginning of the 17th century Bishop Giovanni Emo unified the canons of the two old cathedrals. Finally Bishop Gregorio Barbarigo succeeded in obtaining from Pope Innocent XI the bull Exponi nobis of 18 August 1697, which established for the diocese a single chapter and a single cathedral, changing the dedication of the surviving cathedral to Saint Alexander from Saint Vincent.

In 1689, the structure was refurbished to designs by Carlo Fontana. Another major renovation was undertaken in the 19th century, culminating in the completion of the Neo-classical west front in 1889.

== Interior ==
The cathedral has a Latin cross ground plan with a single nave.

The first side-chapel to the right contains a St. Benedict and Saints by Andrea Previtali (1524), and the first side-chapel to the left, the Madonna and child with saints by Giovan Battista Moroni (1576). The church also contains a Madonna with child with two doves by Giovanni Cariani, as well as canvases attributed to Giambettino Cignaroli and Sebastiano Ricci, including a Saints Firmus, Rusticus, and Proculus (1704). In the apse is a Martyrdom of Bishop Saint John of Bergamo (1731-1743) by Giovanni Battista Tiepolo and a Saint Alexander by Carlo Innocenzo Carloni. The main altar was designed by Filippo Juvarra. The choir area has wooden intaglio panels by Johann Karl Sanz.

== Baptistery ==
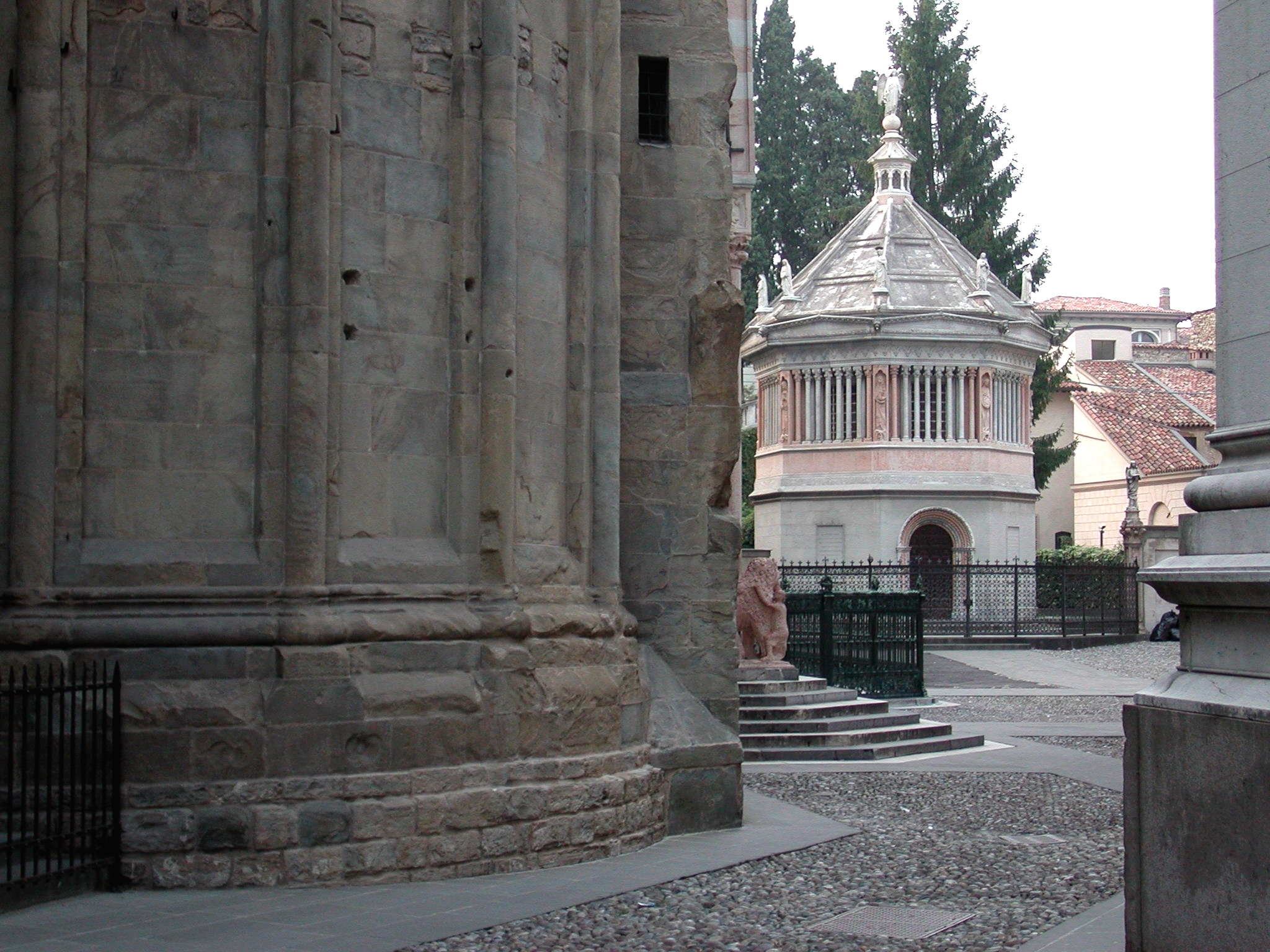
Baptistery

Nearby stands the octagonal baptistery, constructed in 1340 by Giovanni da Campione for the Basilica of Santa Maria Maggiore. During major building works in 1650 the baptistery was dismantled, but was saved, and in 1856 reassembled in the canons' courtyard. It was moved to its present site in 1889.

Inside are bas-reliefs of episodes of the Life of Christ, a statue of John the Baptist and a font of 1340 by Giovanni da Campione.

Round the upper level runs a colonnade, and over it stand eight 14th-century statues representing the Virtues.

== Sources ==
- Bergamo Cathedral official website (in Italian)
- Bergamo Cathedral official website: virtual tour (in Italian)
- Cathedral interior (in Italian)
- Brief description (in Italian)
- Description (in Italian)
