= Bergamo Conservatory =

Music conservatory in Bergamo, Italy

The Conservatorio Gaetano Donizetti, more commonly known in English as the Bergamo Conservatory, is a music conservatory in Bergamo, Italy. Founded in 1805, the school was an important early conservatory model which had a wide impact on similar schools founded later in Italy. In 2023 the school merged with the Accademia Carrara to form the Politecnico delle Arti di Bergamo.

== History ==
The Bergamo Conservatory was founded by the German composer Simon Mayr in 1805 with the name Lezioni Caritatevoli di Musica. Mayr was then working as the maestro di cappella of the Santa Maria Maggiore, Bergamo and the school was initially operated by that cathedral. One of Mayr's early pupils at the school was the composer Gaetano Donizetti, and in 1897 the school's name was changed to the Istituto Musicale Gaetano Donizetti in honor of the school's famous alumnus.

In 1908 a separate Schola Cantorum was established at the Bergamo Cathedral at which point in time the Bergamo Conservatory ended its relationship with the cathedral and became an autonomous school under the management of the Misericordia Maggiore of Bergamo. In 1958 the conservatory became a public institution under the management of the government of Bergamo at which point in time the school's name was changed to the Civico Istituto Musicale Gaetano Donizetti. In 2007 the school moved from its historic location in the via Arena area of Bergamo to the via Scotti area of the city. In 2016 the school moved to its present location in newly built headquarters in the Don Luigi Palazzolo. In January 2023 the school merged with the Accademia Carrara to form the Politecnico delle Arti di Bergamo.
