= Accademia Carrara =

Art gallery and fine arts school in Bergamo, Italy

Accademia Carrara di Belle Arti di Bergamo
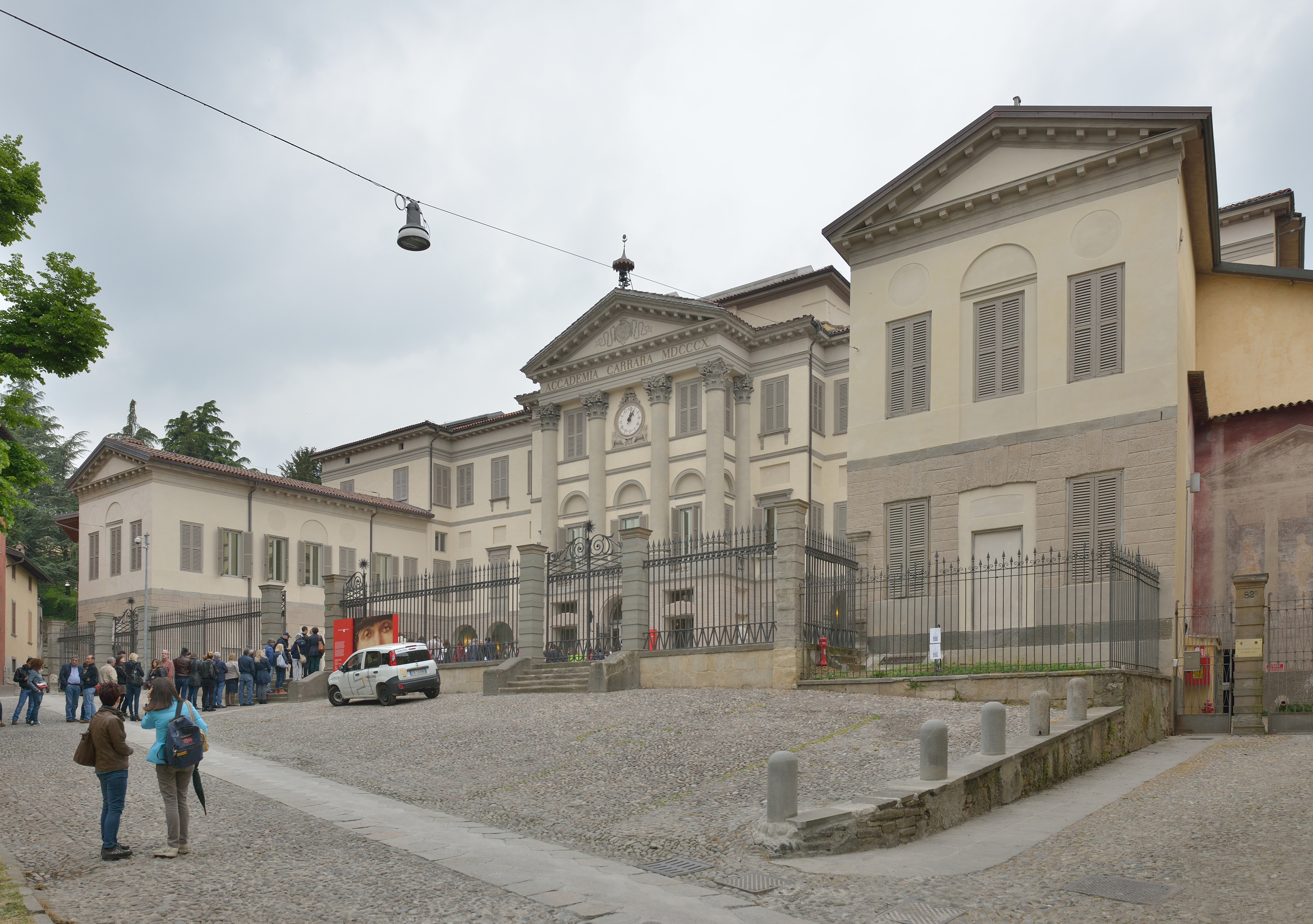
- Façade of the Accademia
- Established: after 1780
- Location: Piazza Giacomo Carrara, Bergamo, Lombardy, Italy
- Coordinates: 45.7042°N 9.6758°E
- Type: art museum; academy of fine arts
- Founder: Giacomo Carrara
- Architects: 1780: Costantino Gallizioli; 1810: Simone Elia
- Website: accademiabellearti.bg.it

The Accademia Carrara (Italian pronunciation: [karˈraːra]), officially Accademia Carrara di Belle Arti di Bergamo, is an art gallery and an academy of fine arts in Bergamo, in Lombardy in northern Italy. The art gallery was established in about 1780 by Giacomo Carrara, a Bergamasco collector or conoscitore of the arts. The academy of fine arts was added to it in 1794. The school was recognised by the Ministero dell'Istruzione, dell'Università e della Ricerca, the Italian ministry of education, in 1988 and in 2023 merged with the Conservatorio Gaetano Donizetti to form the Politecnico delle Arti di Bergamo.

== History ==
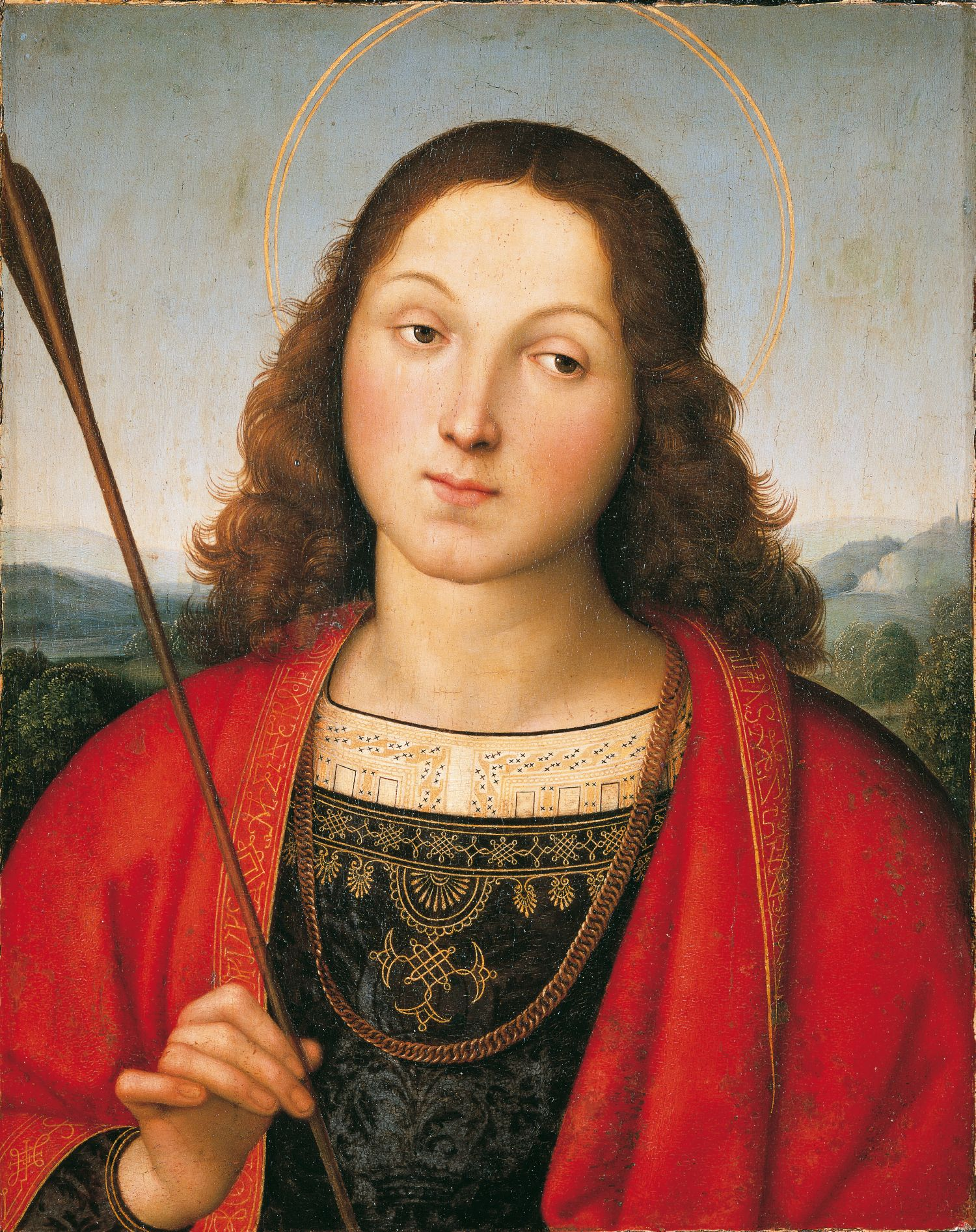
St. Sebastian by Raphael (1501/1502).

The art gallery was established in the early 1780s by Giacomo Carrara, a Bergamasco collector or conoscitore of the arts; by 1785 it was open to some visitors. An academy of fine arts was added to it in 1793 or 1794, initially under the direction of the Milanese painter Carlo Dionigi Sadis.

Carrara made his will in 1795, leaving his entire estate to the gallery and art school he had founded; these were to be managed by a five-member commission, of which the first five were chosen by him. He died the next year.

The building was partly built by Carrara between 1775 and 1781 to designs by Costantino Gallizioli; it incorporated parts of earlier structures. It was modified between 1808 and 1813 to designs in Neo-Classical style by Simone Elia, who had been a pupil of Leopoldo Pollack at the Accademia di Brera.

In 1958 the Comune di Bergamo took over the management of the gallery and school, which in 1988 was recognised by the Ministero dell'Istruzione, dell'Università e della Ricerca, the Italian ministry of education, and came under the administration of that ministry.

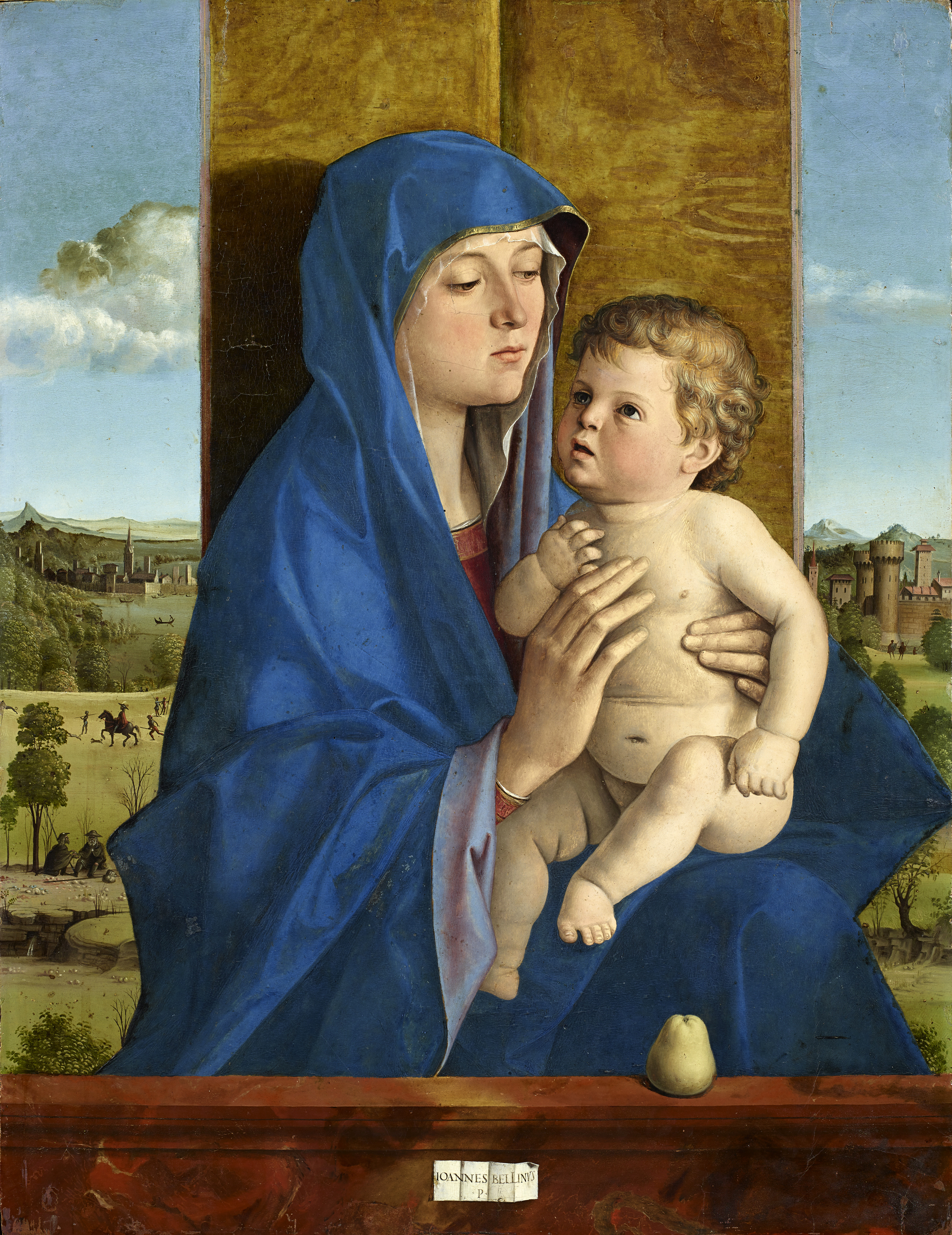
Bellini, Giovanni - Madonna di Alzano - Accademia Carrara.

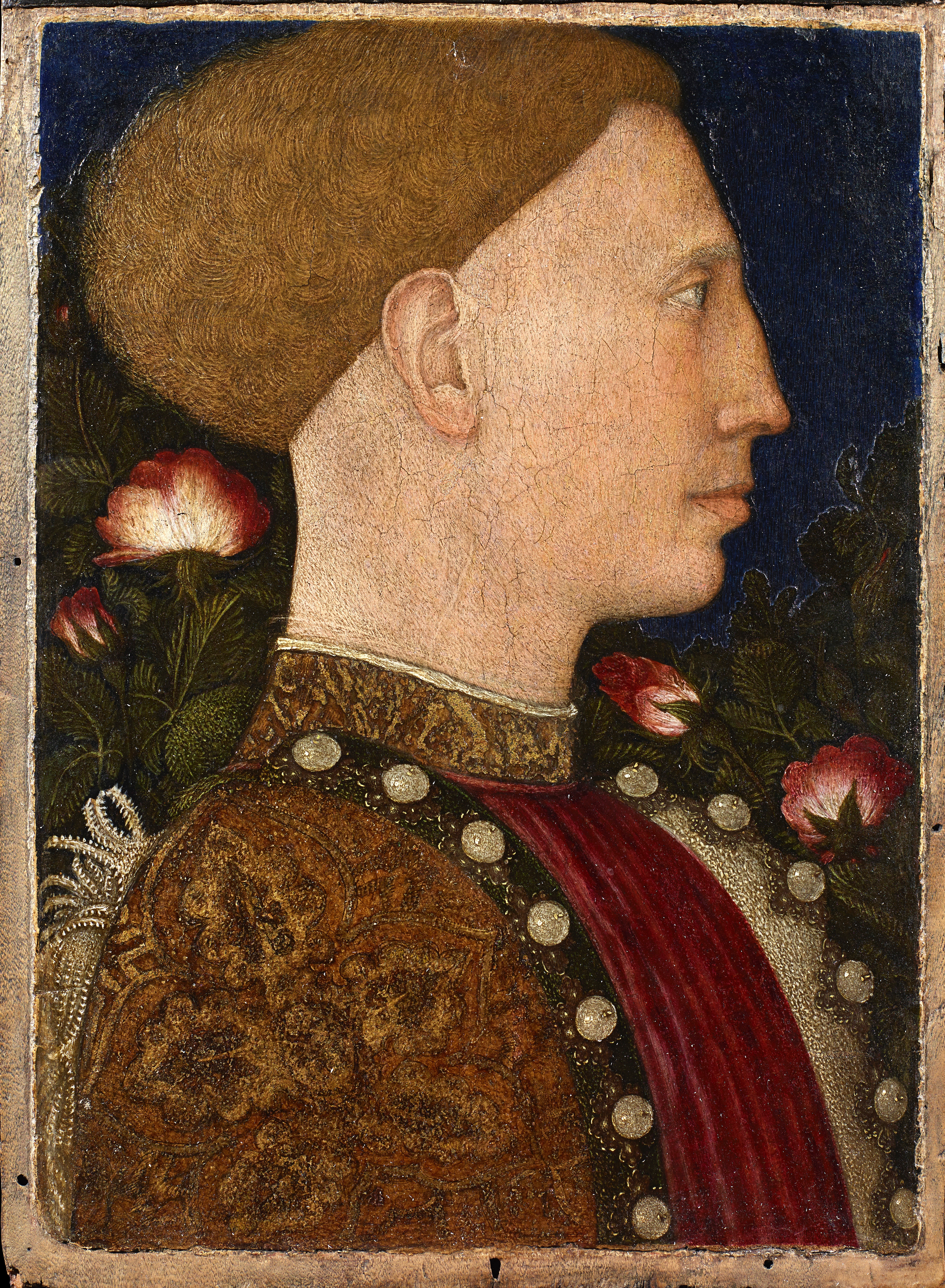
Pisanello, ritratto di leonello d'este, 1441, 01

== Directors-general ==
The directors-general at the Accademia Carrara have been, in chronological order, Giuseppe Diotti, Enrico Scuri, Cesare Tallone, Ponziano Loverini, Luigi Brignoli, Achille Funi, Trento Longaretti, Pierluigi De Vecchi, Mario Cresci and Maria Grazia Recanati.

== See also ==
- Catalogue of the Pinacoteca of the Accademia Carrara
- List of academies of fine art in Italy
