= Orio al Serio =

- Comune
- Comune di Orio al Serio
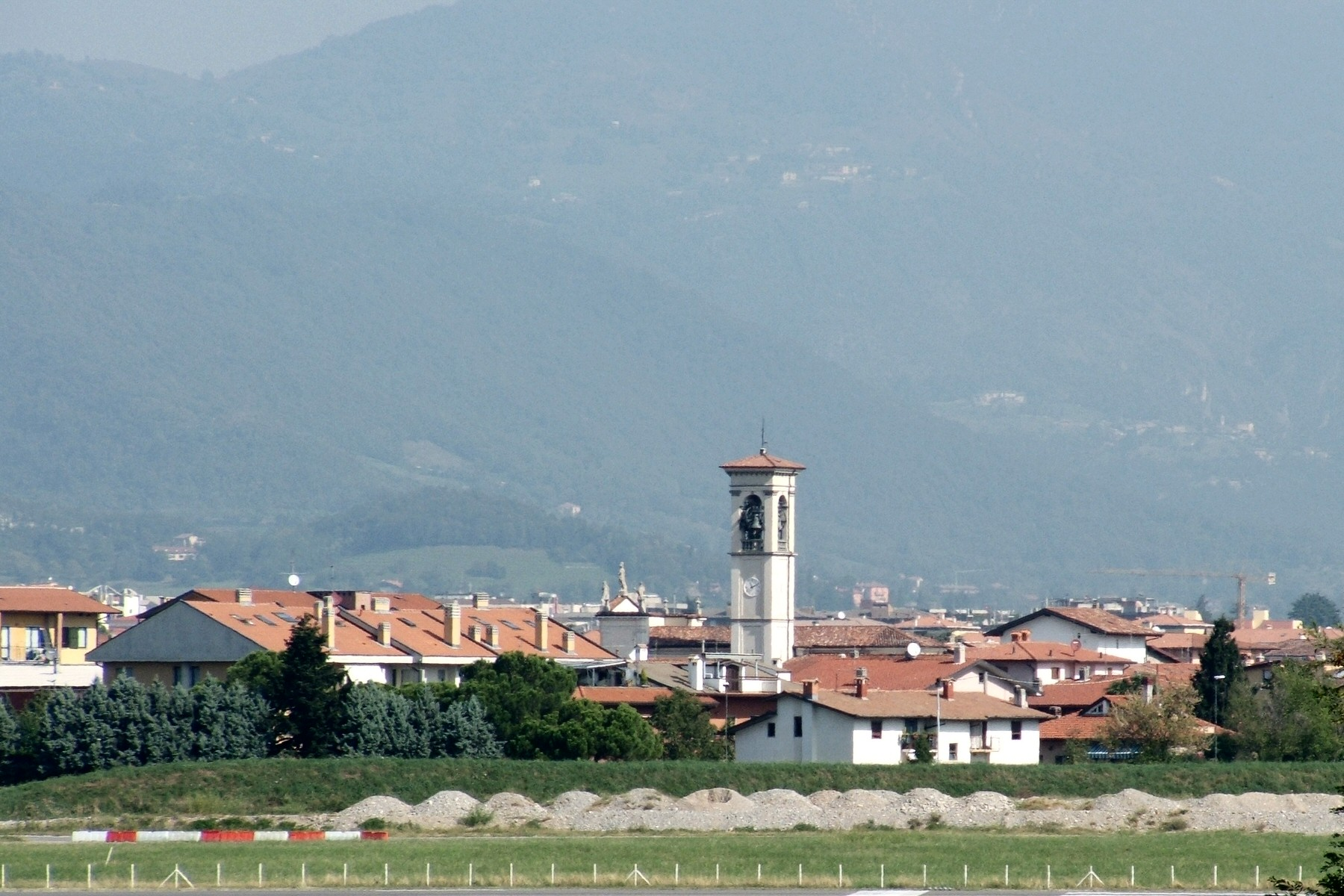

- Coat of arms

- Location within Italy Location within Lombardy
- Coordinates: 45°40′N 9°41′E
- Country: Italy
- Region: Lombardy
- Province: Bergamo (BG)

Government
  - Mayor: Alessandro Colletta

Area
  - Total: 3.04 km^{2} (1.17 sq mi)
- Elevation: 241 m (791 ft)

Population (2026)
  - Total: 1,588
  - Density: 522/km^{2} (1,350/sq mi)
- Demonym: Oriense(i)
- Time zone: UTC+1 (CET)
  - Summer (DST): UTC+2 (CEST)
- Postal code: 24050
- Dialing code: 035
- Patron saint: St. George
- Saint day: 23 April
- Website: http://www.comune.orioalserio.bg.it/

Orio al Serio (Bergamasque: Öre al Sère) is a village and comune (municipality) in the Province of Bergamo in the region of Lombardy in Italy, located about 45 kilometres (28 mi) northeast of Milan and about 1 kilometre (1 mi) southeast of Bergamo. It has 1,588 inhabitants.

Milan Bergamo Airport is located in the territory of the comune.

Orio is also home to the Orio Center, one of the largest shopping malls in Europe.

== Demographics ==
As of 2026, the population is 1,588, of which 50.9% are male, and 49.1% are female. Minors make up 14.6% of the population, and seniors make up 23%.

Historical population

Year	Pop.	±%
1861	449	—
1871	483	+7.6%
1881	515	+6.6%
1901	577	+12.0%
1911	652	+13.0%
1921	711	+9.0%
1931	792	+11.4%
1936	896	+13.1%

Year	Pop.	±%
1951	1,041	+16.2%
1961	977	−6.1%
1971	1,232	+26.1%
1981	1,233	+0.1%
1991	1,302	+5.6%
2001	1,580	+21.4%
2011	1,733	+9.7%
2021	1,667	−3.8%

Source: ISTAT

=== Immigration ===
As of 2025, of the known countries of birth of 1,593 residents, the most numerous are: Italy (1,365 – 85.7%), Romania (29 – 1.8%), Albania (29 – 1.8%), Senegal (20 – 1.3%), Ivory Coast (17 – 1.1%), Morocco (15 – 0.9%), Bangladesh (11 – 0.7%), Ghana (10 – 0.6%), Bolivia (10 – 0.6%), Ecuador (9 – 0.6%), Burkina Faso (9 – 0.6%).
