= Gallarati =

Gallarati may refer to:

- Dionisio Gallarati (1923–2019), Italian mathematician, specialised in algebraic geometry
- Gian Giacomo Gallarati Scotti (1886–1983), Italian politician and diplomat
- Giuseppe Gallarati (1695–1767), Italian Catholic bishop
- Villa Gallarati Scotti, Vimercate, rural palace located nearVimercate, Province of Monza and Brianza, Italy
- Villa Scheilbler Gallarati Scotti, Rho, 16th-century hunting lodge and rural palace located in Rho, Province of Milan, Italy

== See also ==
- Gallarate
