= Maurizio Malvestiti =

Italian bishop

- Bishop of Lodi
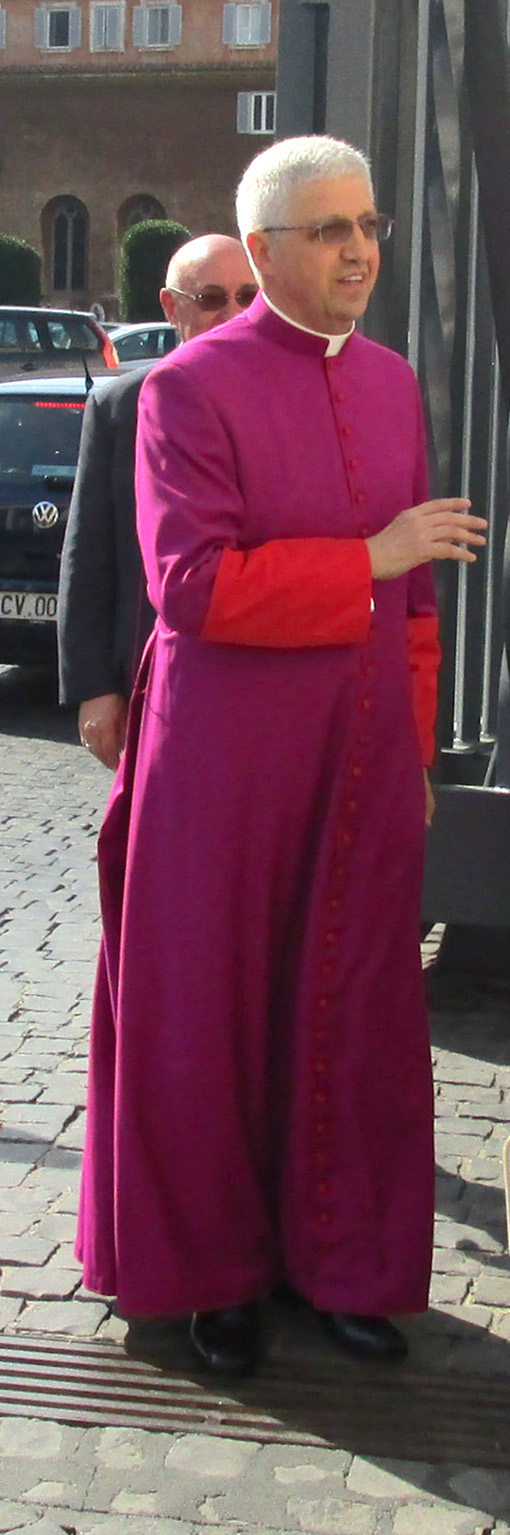
- Bishop Malvestiti, the day of his consecration
- Church: Roman Catholic Church
- See: Diocese of Lodi
- In office: 2014 – present
- Predecessor: Giuseppe Merisi
- Previous posts: Professor at seminary of Bergamo; Official at the Congregation for the Oriental Churches

Orders
- Ordination: 11 June 1977 by Mgr Clemente Gaddi
- Consecration: 11 October 2014 by Cardinal Leonardo Sandri

Personal details
- Born: 25 August 1953 (age 72) Marne, Italy
- Coat of arms

Maurizio Malvestiti (born 25 August 1953) is the bishop of the Roman Catholic Diocese of Lodi, appointed on 26 August 2014, to replace Giuseppe Merisi.

== Biography ==
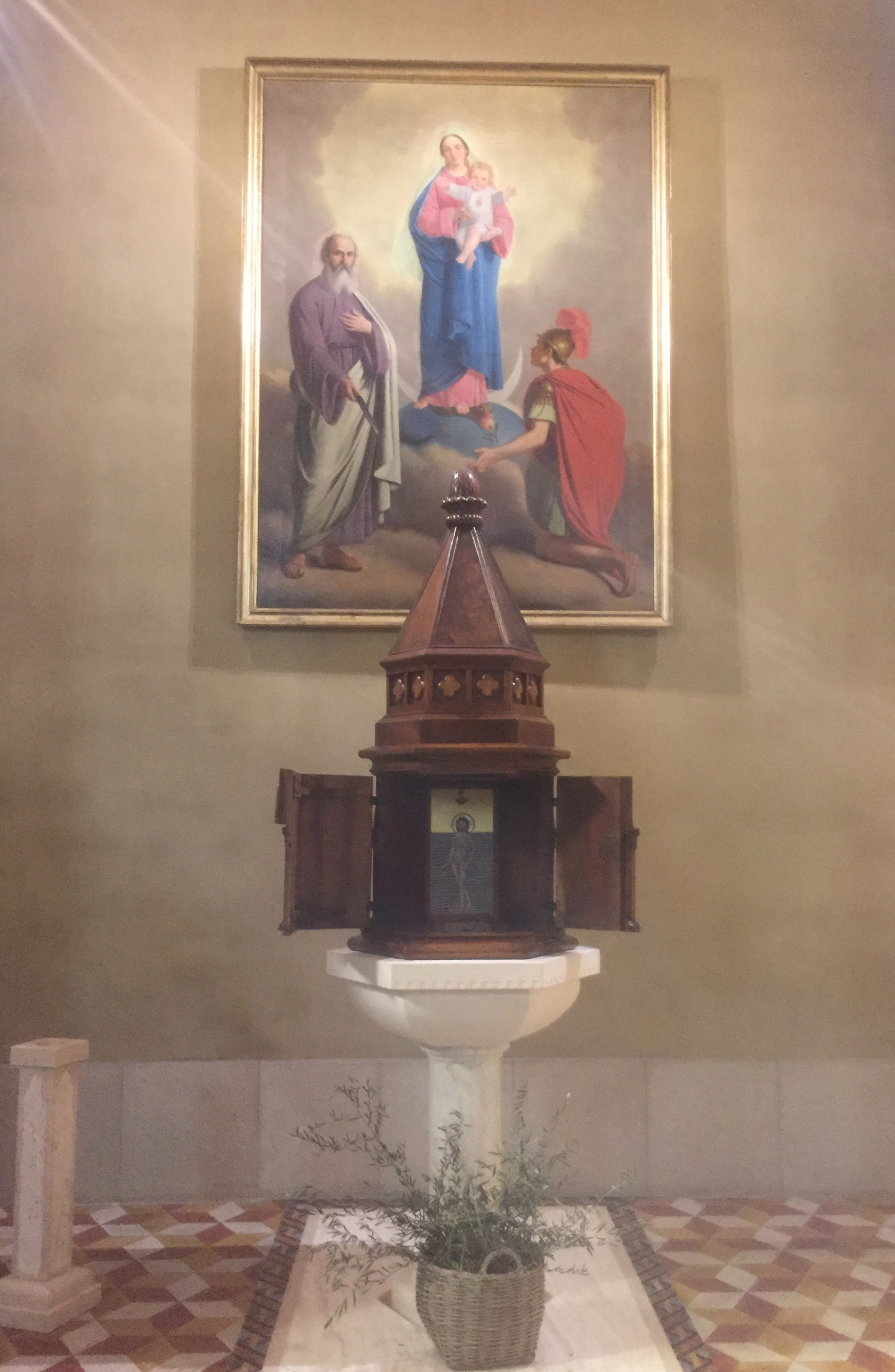
The baptismal font where bishop Maurizio was baptized.

Born in the village of Marne, frazione of Filago in 1953, Malvestiti was baptized in the saint Bartholmew parish church. He studied at the seminary of Bergamo and was ordained as a priest in 1977. He continued his theological studies in Rome and also perfected his knowledge of French and English.

From 1978 to 1994 he taught at the seminary of Bergamo. From 1994 to 2009 he was an official at the Congregation for the Oriental Churches. On 19 June 2009 he became the under-secretary of the congregation, becoming the private secretary of the three prefects, cardinals Achille Silvestrini, Ignace Moussa I Daoud and Leonardo Sandri.

On 26 August 2014 Pope Francis appointed him as the new Bishop of Lodi; He was consecrated on 11 October 2014 by Cardinal Leonardo Sandri in St. Peter's Basilica and installed in Lodi on October 26 following, welcome and proclaimed bishop from cardinal Angelo Scola. The solemn liturgy is celebrated by quite all the priests of the diocese, the cathedral chapter, by cardinal Leonardo Sandri, and several bishops, including Giacomo Capuzzi, Nino Staffieri, Diego Coletti and Claudio Baggini.

On 4 July 2015 he appointed father Bassiano Uggè as new vicar general of the diocese.

Malvestiti is the Grand Prior of the Italia Settentrionale Lieutenancy of the Equestrian Order of the Holy Sepulchre of Jerusalem.

== Gallery ==
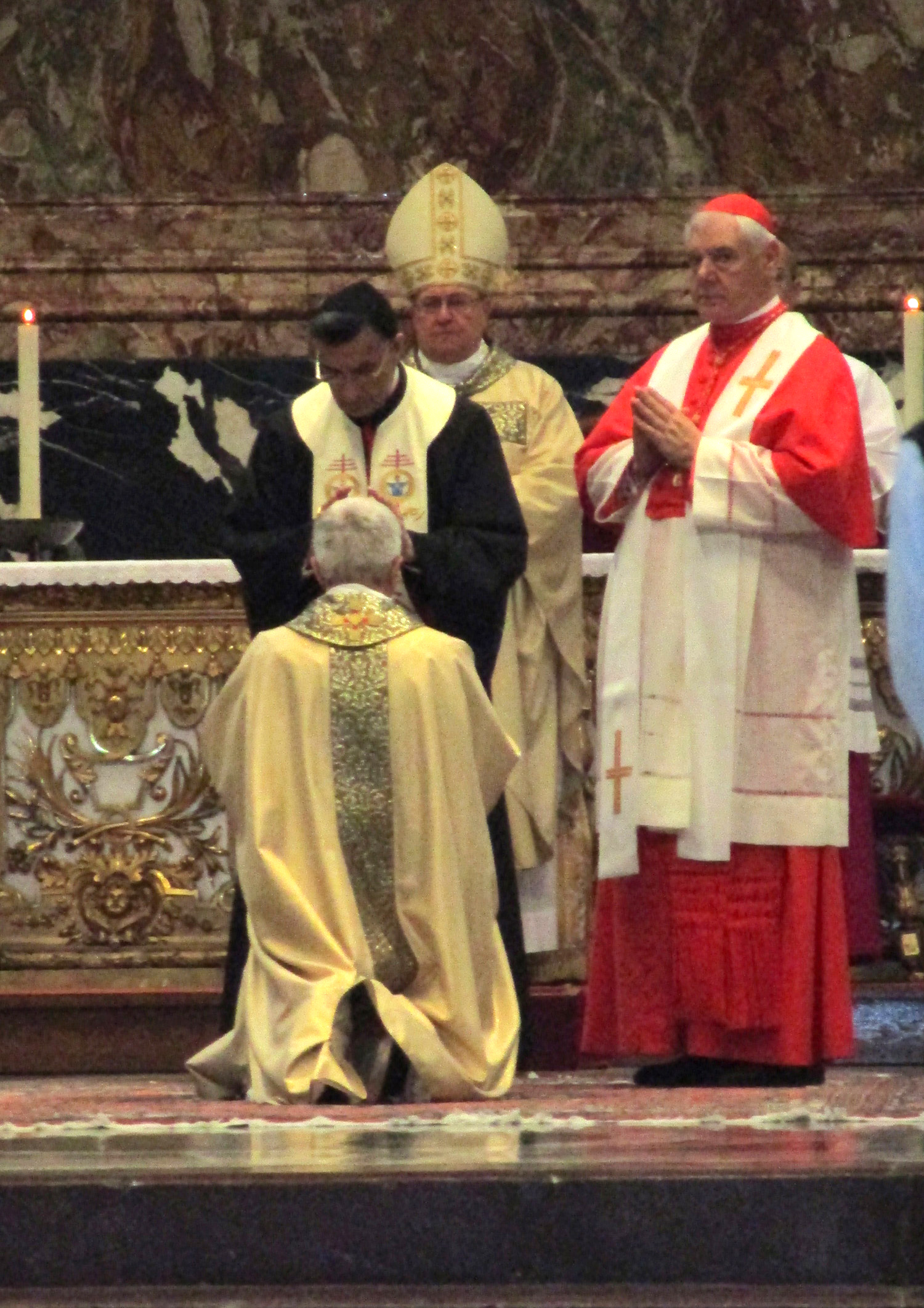
Maronite patriarch Rahi lays on his hands to father Maurizio during the episcopal ordination. Behind them, the cardinals Sandri and Müller.

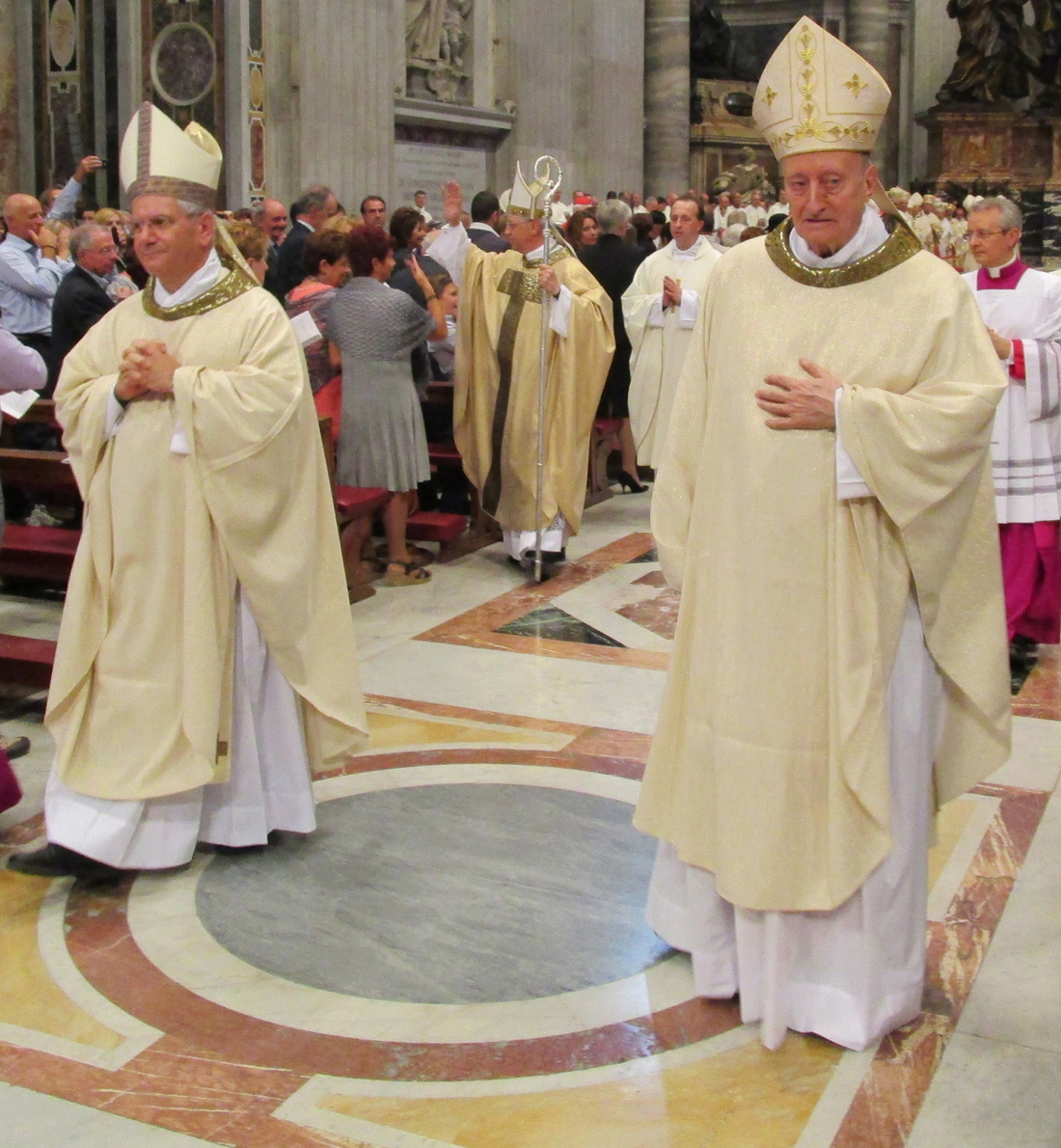
Bishop Malvestiti, just ordained, blessing the people. Behind him, bishops Beschi, left, and Merisi, right.

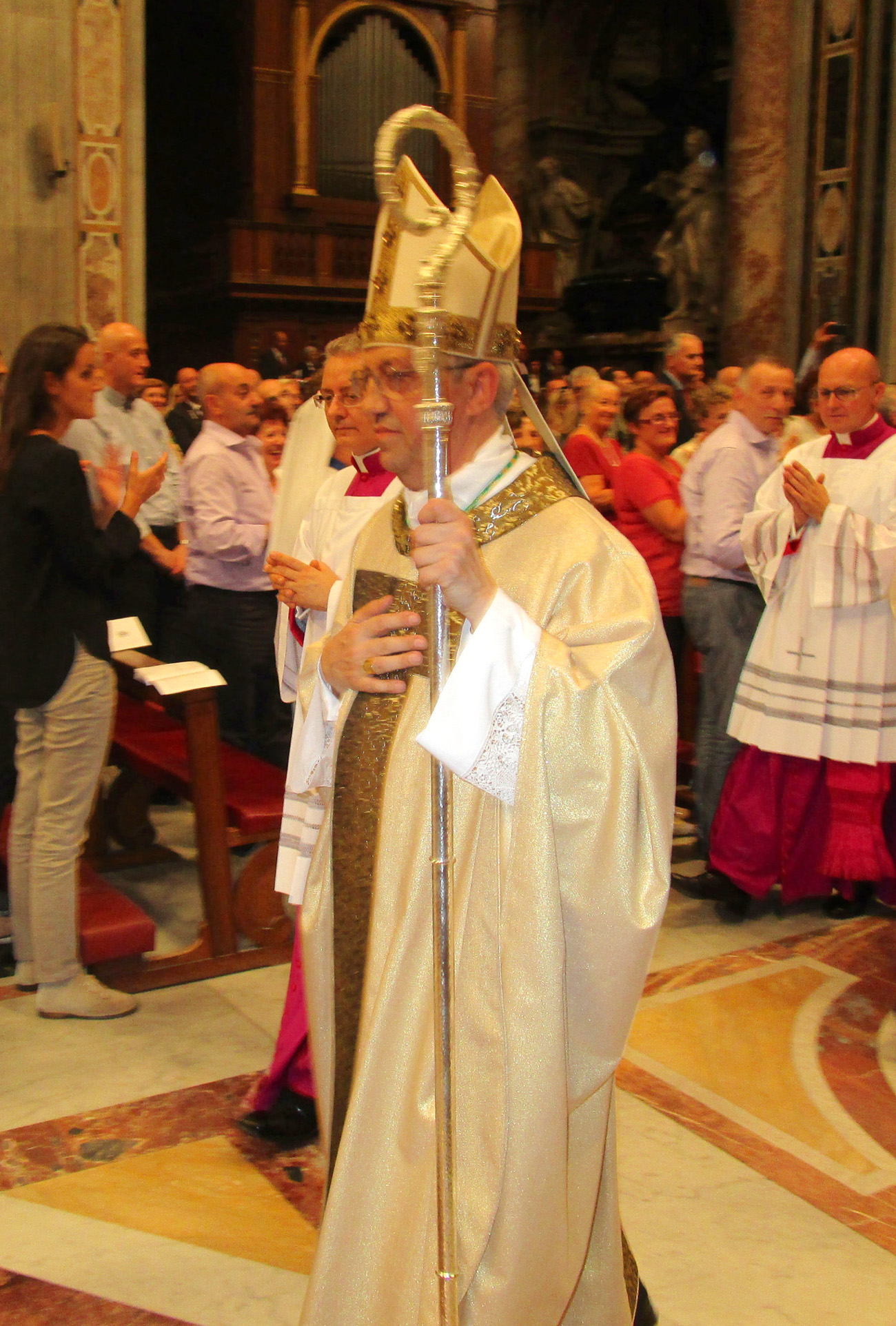
Bishop Malvestiti just consecrated, 11 October 2014

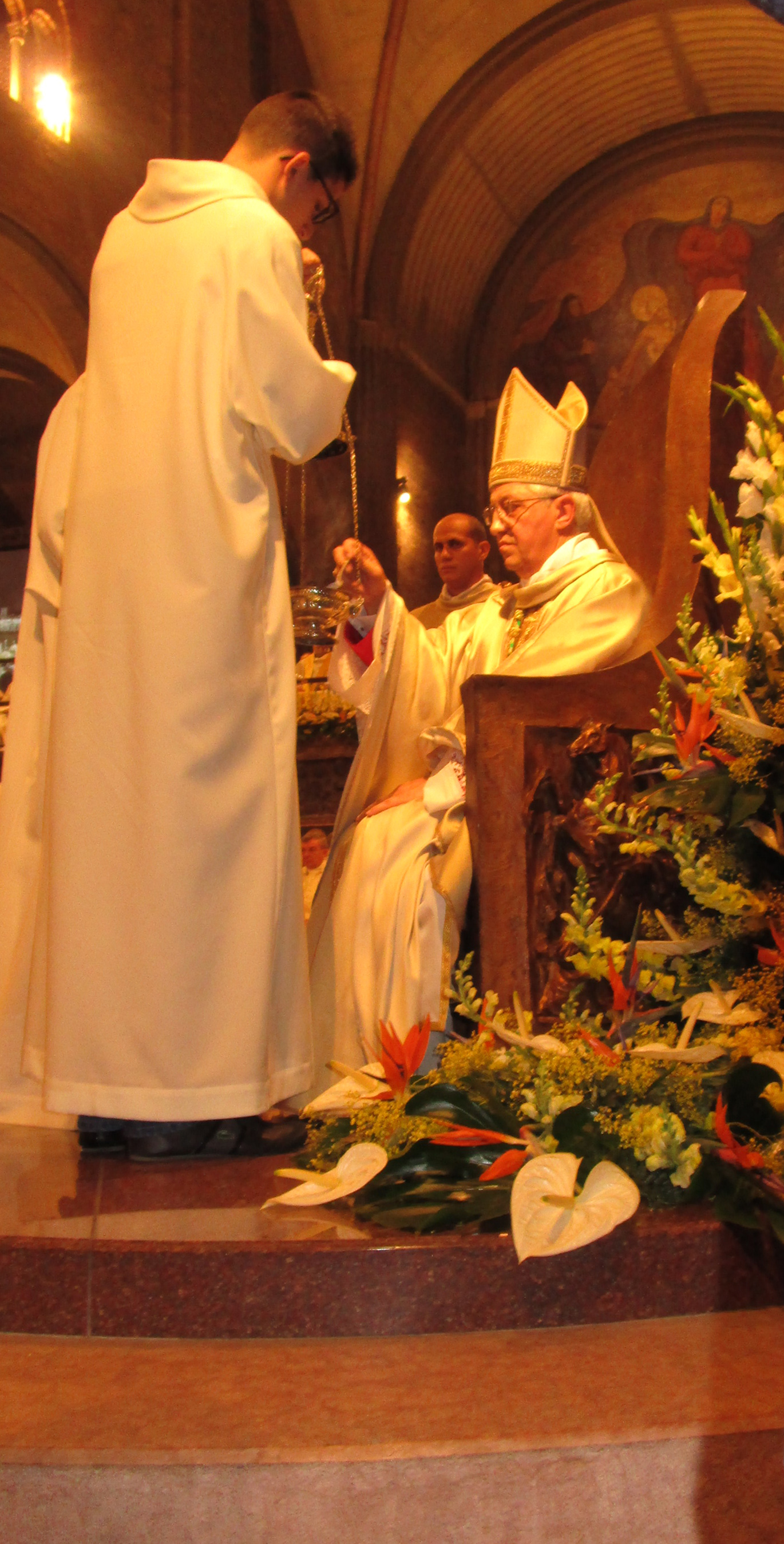
Bishop Malvestiti, just installed on his diocese, 26 October 2014

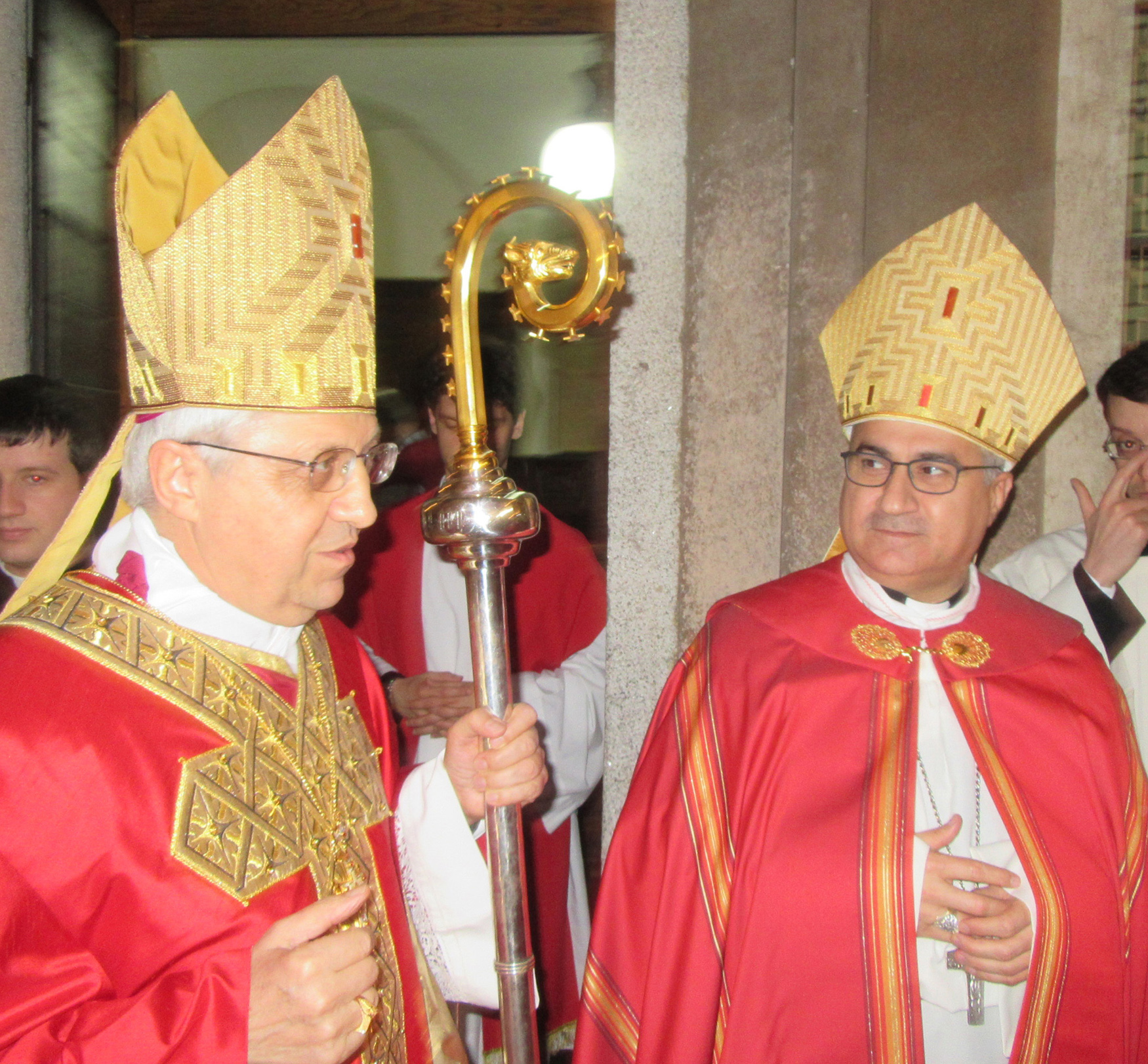
Bishop Malvestiti with bishop Bashar Warda during Pentecost all-night vigil in the cathedral of Lodi, 14 May 2016.

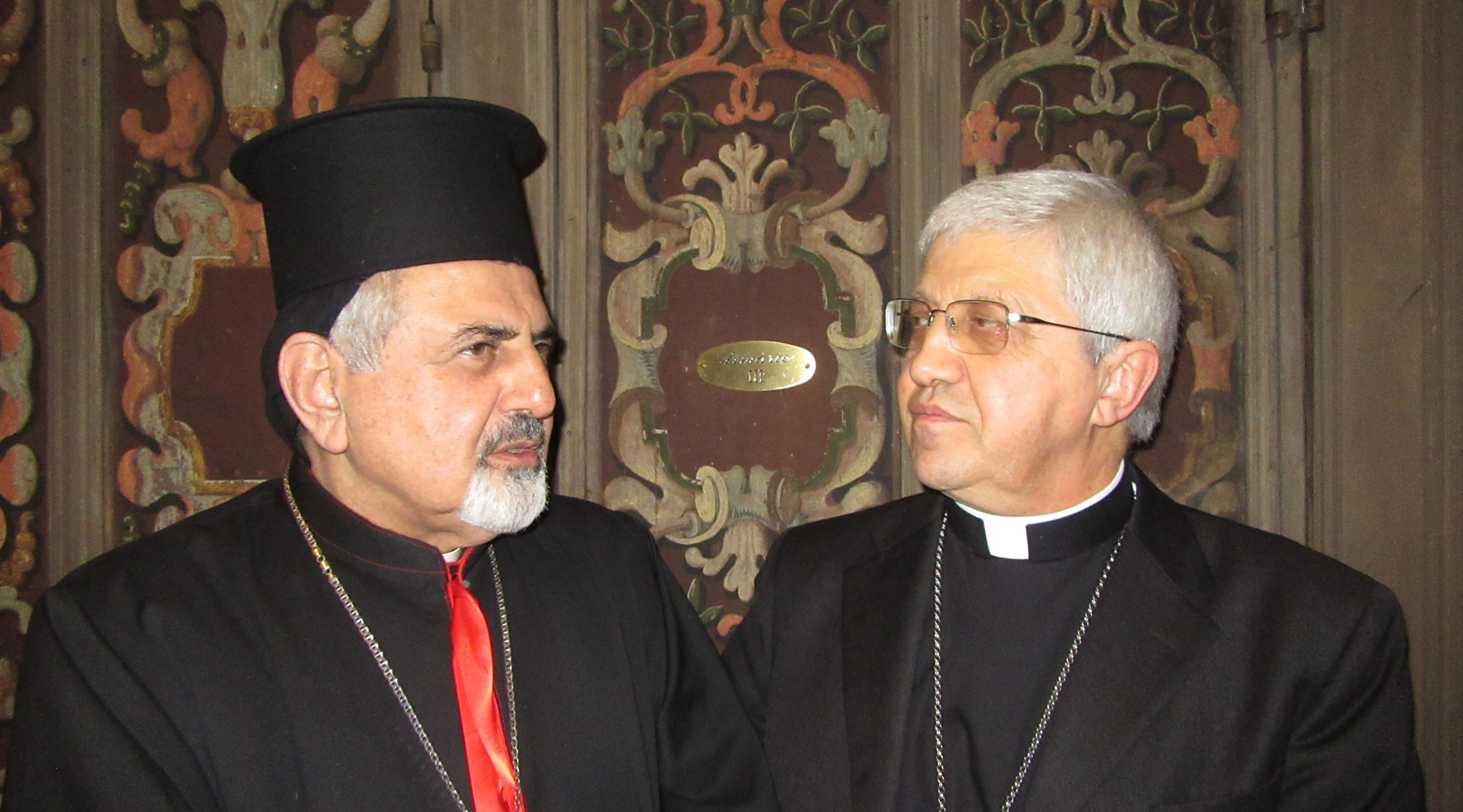
Bishop Malvestiti with patriarch Ignatius Joseph III Yonan, Lodi, 20 February 2017.

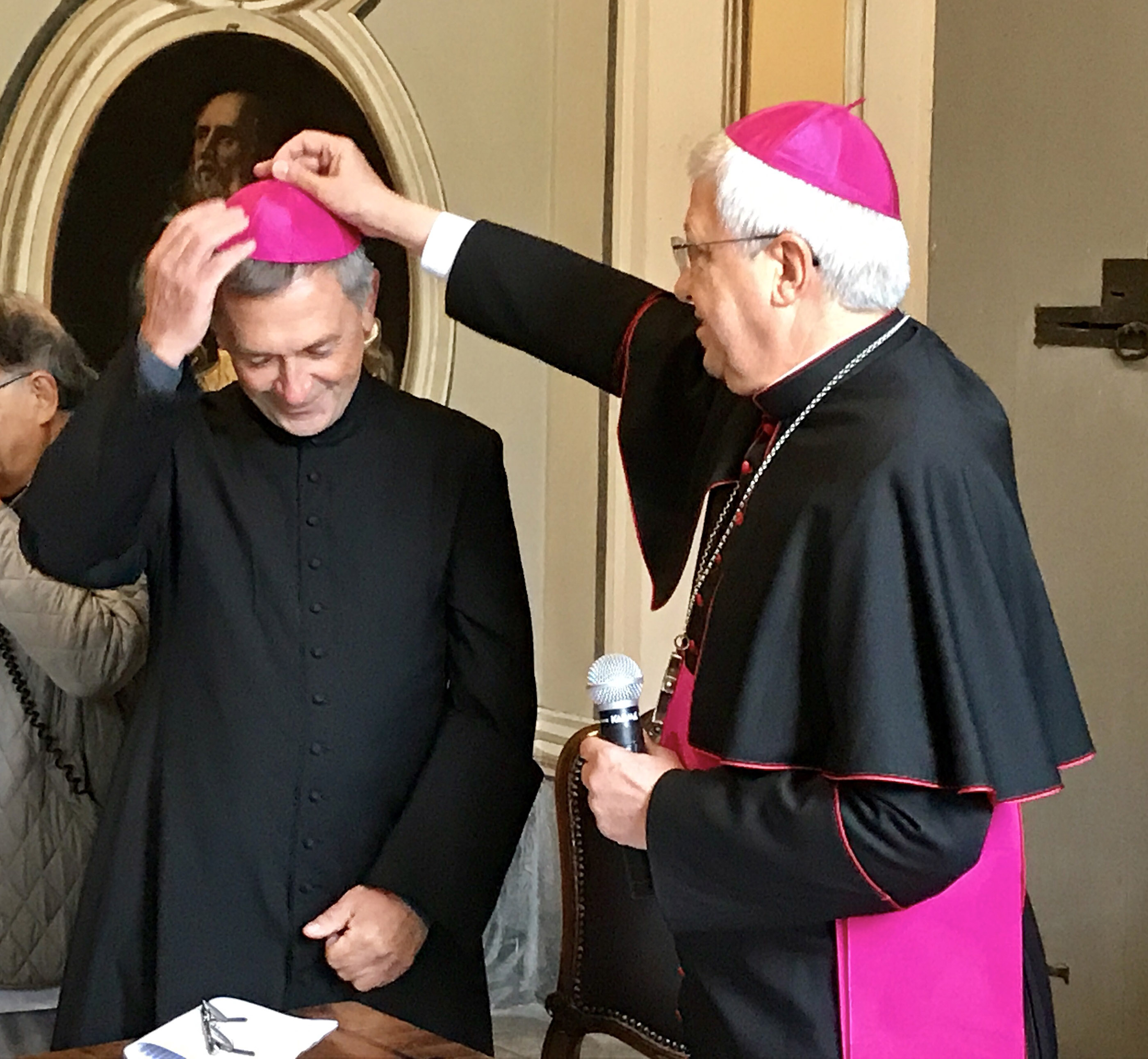
Bishop Malvestiti puts the zucchetto on the head of father Egidio Miragoli, just elected bishop of Mondovì, 29 September 2017

== Sources ==
- Official website of the Diocese of Lodi (in Italian)

Catholic Church titles
Preceded by Giuseppe Merisi	Bishop of Lodi; 26 August 2014 – present	Succeeded by Incumbent
