= Antonio Bernieri =

Antonio Bernieri may refer to:

- Antonio Bernieri (bishop)
- Antonio Bernieri (painter)
