= Beschi =

Beschi is a surname. Notable people with the surname include:

- Constanzo Beschi (1680–1742), Italian Jesuit priest
- Francesco Beschi (born 1951), Italian Roman Catholic bishop
