= Carlo Pallavicino =

Carlo Pallavicino may refer to:

- Carlo Pallavicino (bishop) (died 1497), Roman Catholic prelate
- Carlo Pallavicino (composer) (1630–1688), Italian composer
