= Marne, Italy =

Village in the province of Bergamo in Italy

Coordinates: 45°37′31″N 9°33′23″E

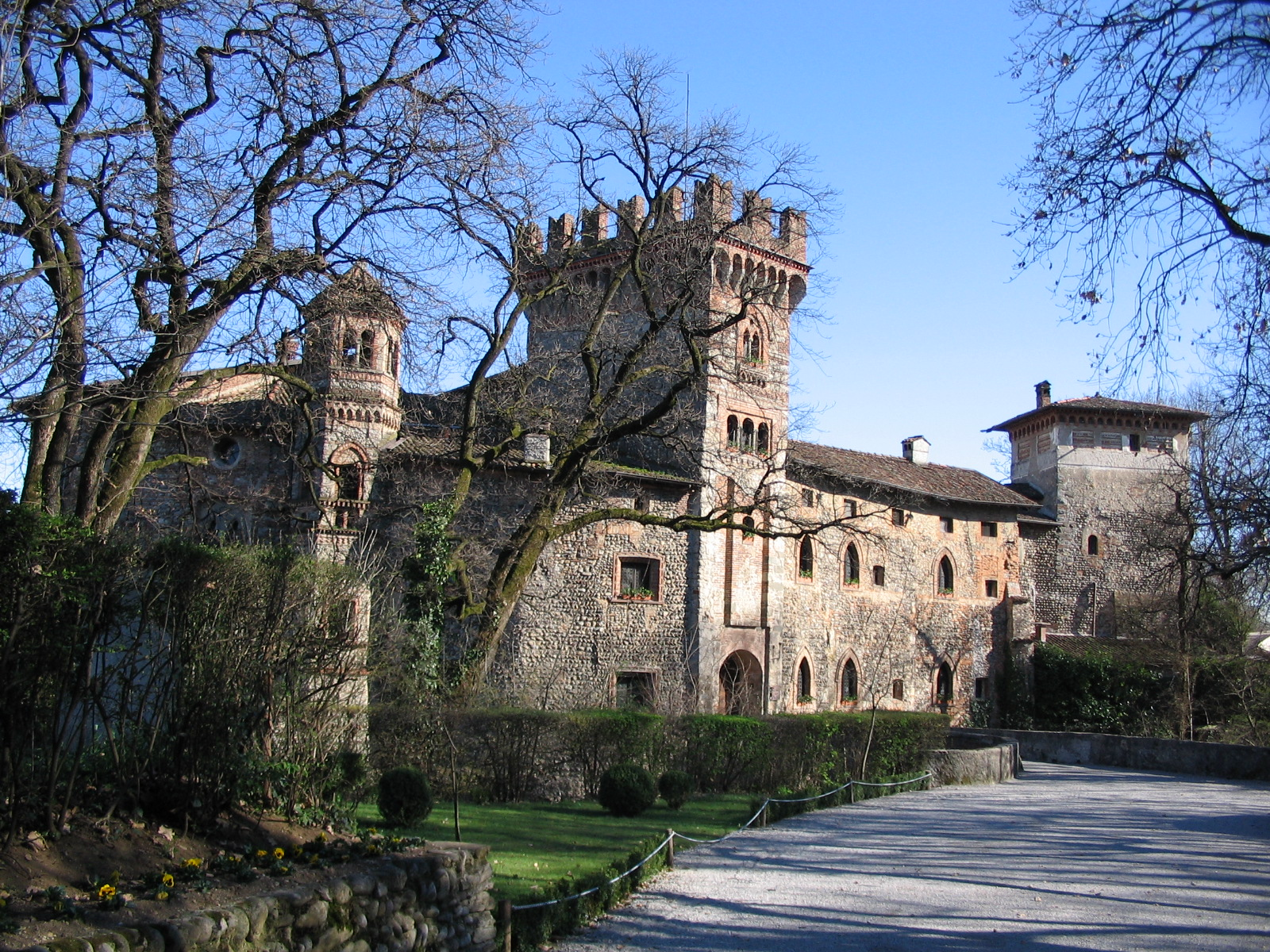
Marne Castle

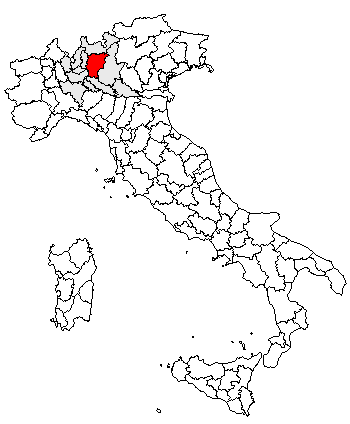
Location of the province of Bergamo

Marne is a village in the province of Bergamo in Italy. It is a frazione of the comune of Filago.

== History ==
The village became part of Brembate di Sotto on the order of Napoleon. Filago decided to annex the village during the Fascist period; it did not, however, officially become part of Filago until after the formation of the Italian Republic in 1946.

== Main sights ==
- Saint Bartholomew Parish Church, 12th century

== Notable people ==
- Maurizio Malvestiti, (born 1953) bishop of Lodi, born in Marne
