= Madonna and Child with the Infant Saint John the Baptist (Leonardo) =

Composition by Leonardo da Vinci and his workshop

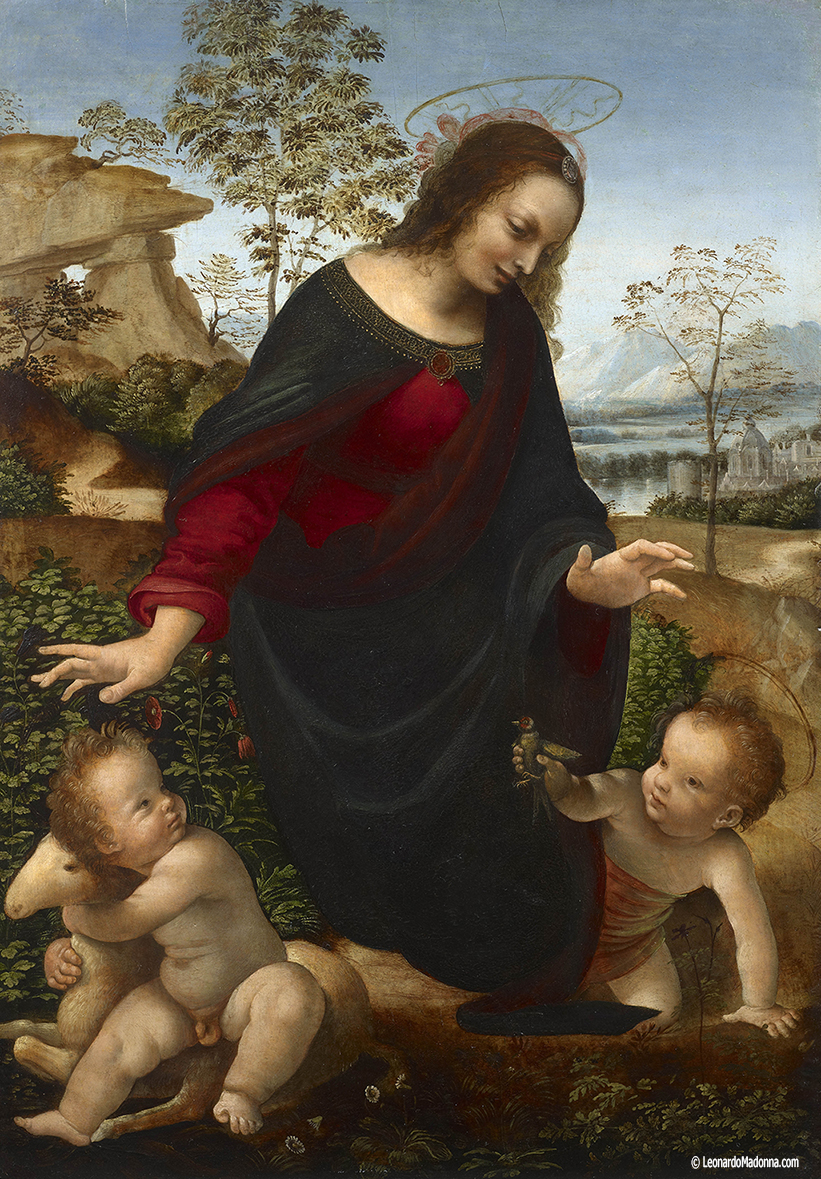
- Artist: Leonardo da Vinci and his workshop
- Year: late 1470s – middle/late 1480s
- Type: Oil, tempera, gold on panel
- Dimensions: 71.8 cm × 50.5 cm (28.25 in × 19.875 in)
- Location: Private collection, Moscow

The Madonna and Child with the Infant Saint John the Baptist is a lost composition by Leonardo da Vinci. The composition is known through a handful of paintings attributed to artists in Leonardo's circle. An original underdrawing by Leonardo may be preserved in a version in a private collection in Moscow, Russia.

== Description ==
The painting depicts the Virgin Mary with arms outstretched and the infant Christ embracing a lamb. The infant John the Baptist is depicted holding a goldfinch, a symbol of the passion. The three figures are shown before a vegetated and rocky landscape and with architectural structures in the distance.

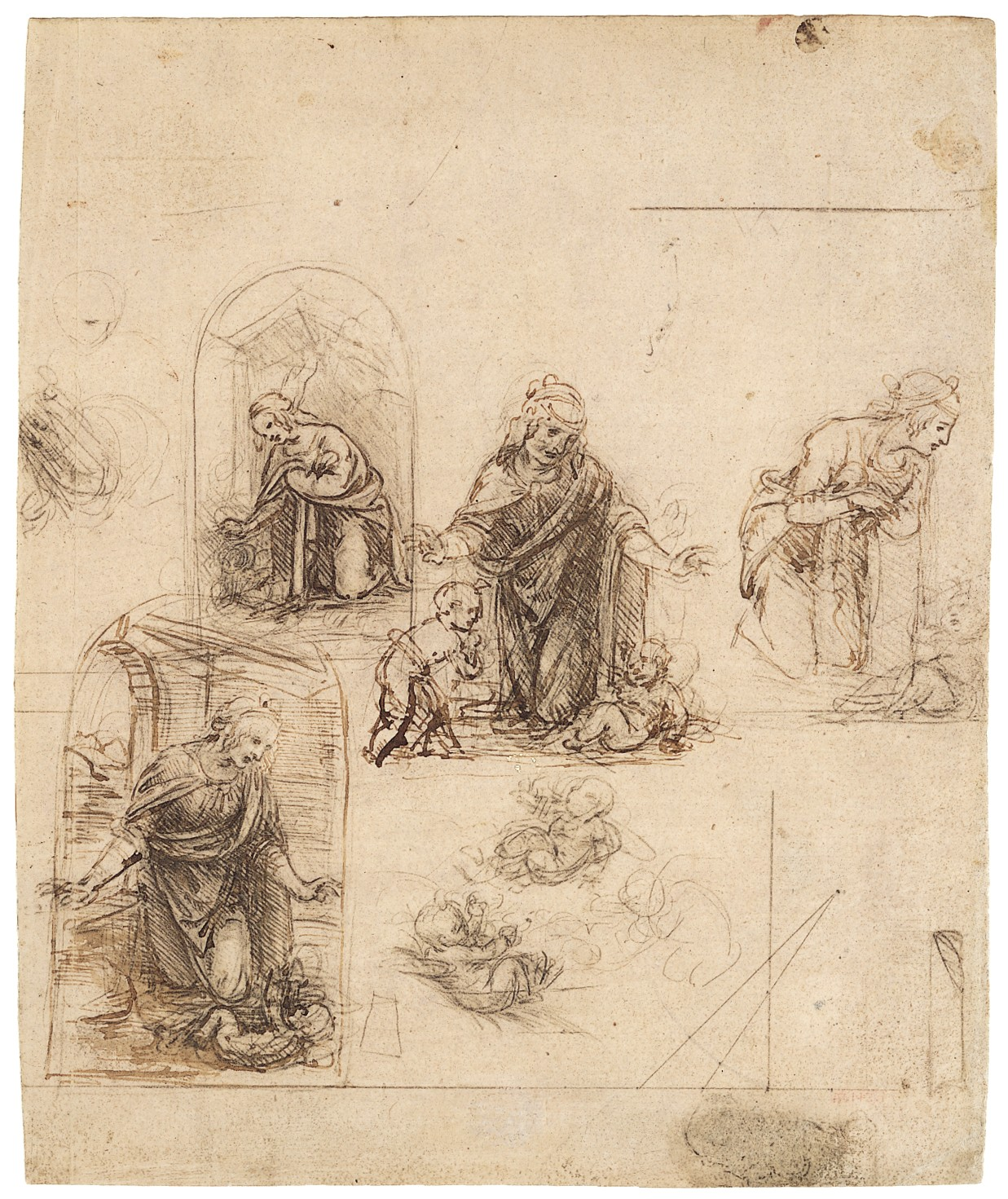
Compositional sketches for the Virgin adoring the child Christ, Metropolitan Museum of Art.

The Virgin with her arms outstretched is a common motif among the compositions of Leonardo and his studio. Leonardo likely began developing the motif in the mid-1480s in preparation for the two versions of The Virgin of the Rocks at the Louvre and the National Gallery. Drawings in the Metropolitan Museum of Art and the Royal Collection show Leonardo's exploration of the motif and were likely studies for The Virgin and Child with Saint Anne.

Additionally, drawings at the Getty Museum and the Royal Library, Windsor show variations on the motif of a child embracing a lamb.

== Attribution ==
In 1930, Tancred Borenius attributed the Ashmolean version to Leonardo. Though this has gone undisputed, it has not been accepted by most scholars of Leonardo.

Recent research by a consortium of Leonardo experts argues that the Moscow version is likely the origin of the composition and may contain an underdrawing by Leonardo's hand. The consortium included Alexander Kossolapov, Martin Kemp, and Thereza Wells. Kemp said of the painting:

This is the most remarkable of the narrative Madonnas, with the child reacting to the goldfinch which is held up by Saint John with him clinging onto the lamb, the sacrificial animal ... As far as attributions go it is very difficult because you've got studio production, you've got various artists of various status, you've also got later of followers ... But the Leonardo involvement in the inventione is perfectly clear.

Kossolapov argued that the Moscow painting is the work by Leonardo and his workshop. Kemp and Wells were more reserved and concluded there were no clear signs of Leonardo's hand in the underdrawing. They further concluded that there probably never was an 'original' painting and the Moscow and Florence versions would have been regarded as 'Leonardo's', that is, works produced in Leonardo's brand.

== Copies and variations ==
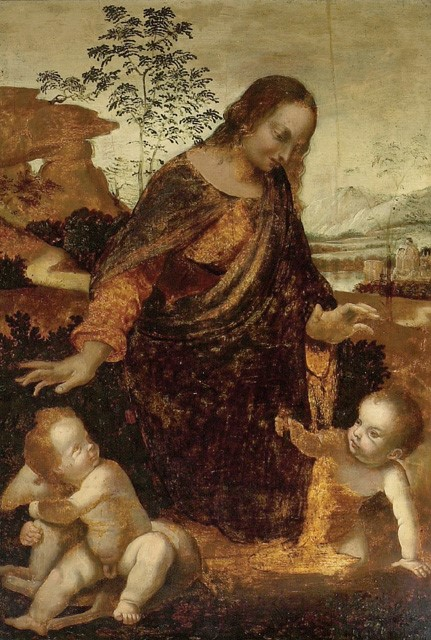
Workshop of Leonardo da Vinci, Madonna and Child with the Infant Saint John the Baptist, after 1485, oil on panel, Ashmolean Museum of Art and Archaeology, Oxford, England.

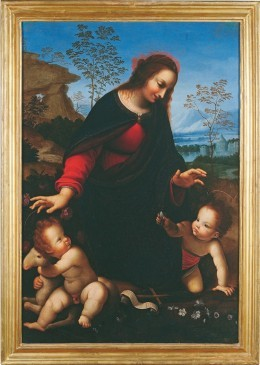
Possibly Hernando de los Llanos or Fernando Yáñez de la Almedina, Madonna and Child with the Infant Saint John the Baptist, c. 1505, oil on panel, Palazzo Pitti, Florence.

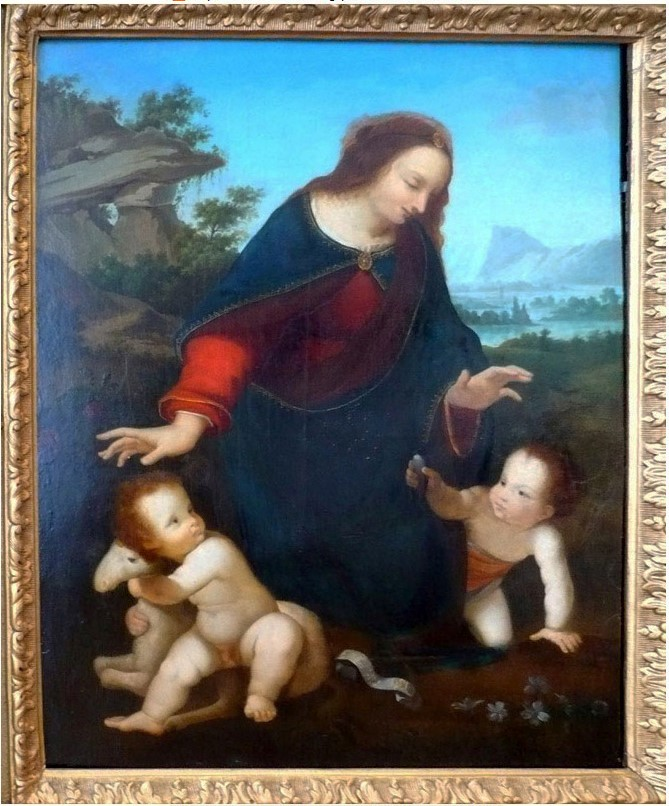
Cesare da Sesto, Madonna and Child with the Infant Saint John the Baptist, 16th century, Château de Flers, Orne.- France.

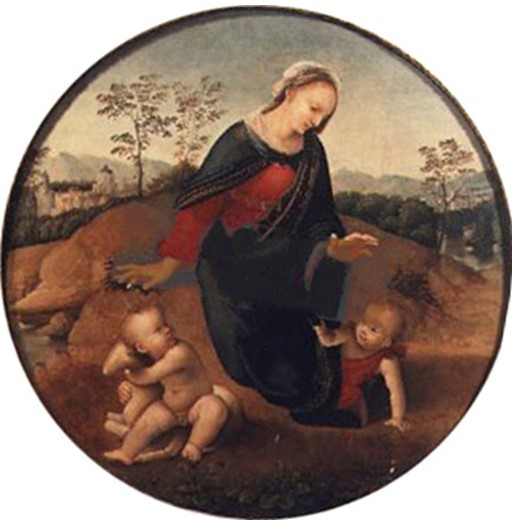
After Leonardo da Vinci, Madonna and Child with the Infant Saint John the Baptist, Villa Scheilbler Gallarati Scotti, Milan

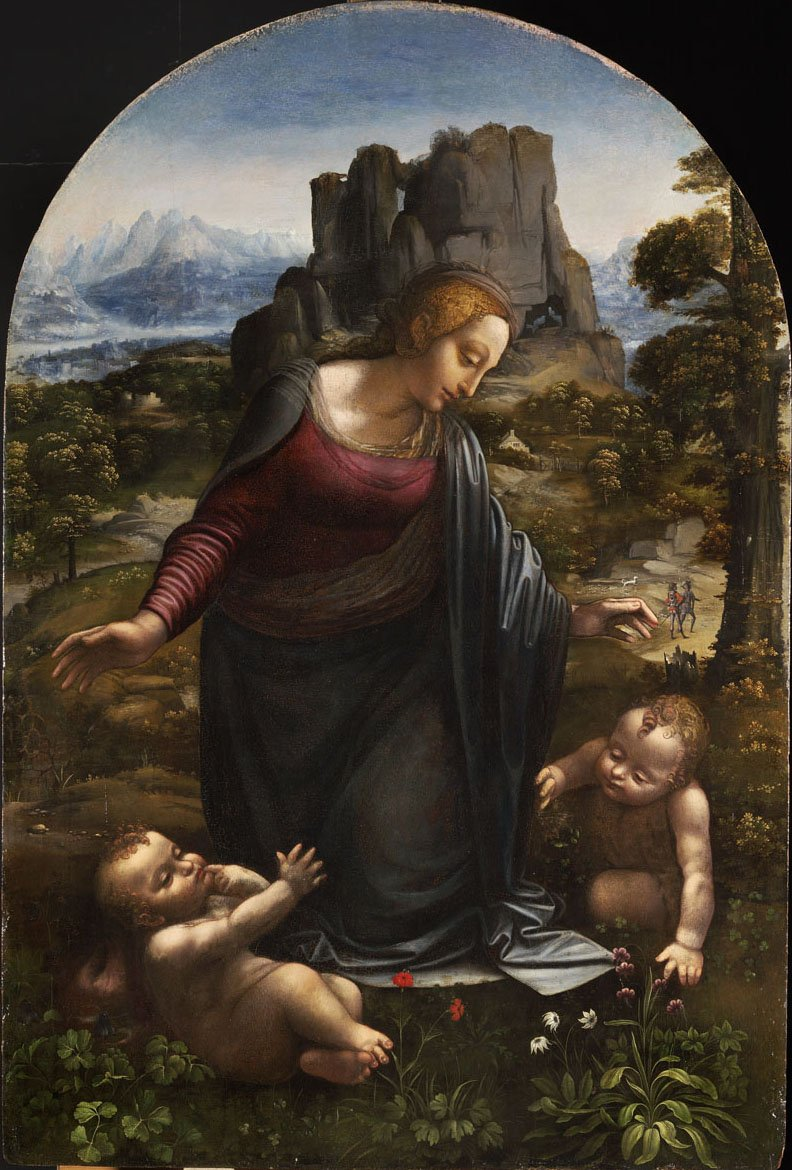
Workshop of Leonardo da Vinci, possibly Marco d'Oggiono, Virgin and Child with the Young Saint John the Baptist, c. 1490–1515, oil on panel, Museum of Fine Arts (Budapest), Hungary.

== See also ==
- List of works by Leonardo da Vinci
