= Ludovico Taverna =

Italian diplomat and bishop (1535–1617)

- Bishop of Lodi
- Church: Catholic Church
- See: Bishop of Lodi
- Appointed: 9 December 1579
- Term ended: May 1616
- Predecessor: Girolamo Federici
- Successor: Michelangelo Seghizzi
- Other posts: Apostolic Nuncio to Spain; Apostolic Nuncio to Venice

Orders
- Consecration: 12 March 1580 (Bishop) by Giovanni Antonio Serbelloni

Personal details
- Born: 1535 Milan, Duchy of Milan
- Died: 3 June 1617 (aged 81–82) Milan, Duchy of Milan

Ludovico Taverna (or Luigi Taverna, Latin: Ludovicus Taberna, 1535–1617) was an Italian diplomat and bishop, who served as Apostolic Nuncio to Spain from 1582 to 1585, as Apostolic Nuncio to Venice from 1592 to 1596 and as Bishop of Lodi from 1579 to 1616.

== Life ==
Ludovico Taverna was born in Milan in 1535, illegitimate son of Francesco, (Note: Francesco Taverna was born in 1488 in Milan. Under Francesco II Sforza he was ambassador in France and in Rome for the Duchy of Milan. He became High Chancellor of the Duchy in 1533, and was confirmed in that government up to 1556 when he was arrested for a political conspiracy. He was restored as High Chancellor in 1558, and died in Milano on 14 August 1560. He was buried in Santa Maria della Passione church.) High Chancellor of the Duchy of Milan and count of Landriano.

In March 1553 he was authorized to receive the tonsure, i.e. to become a cleric, notwithstanding his illegitimate birth. On 26 September 1560 he graduated in utroque iure in the University of Pavia and moved to Rome.

He took up a career in the administration of the Papal States: on 12 February 1564 he was appointed Governor of Città di Castello, on 18 January 1568 Governor of Camerino, 20 January 1568 he was appointed Protonotary apostolic, on 14 January 1470 he became Governor of Fermo.

Finally on 28 August 1573 he was appointed to the important position of Governor of Rome which he held up to 29 December 1576, and in 1576 he was appointed to the even more important position of General Treasurer of the Apostolic Camera, being the first Treasurer with a legal and administrative curriculum.

To thank him for his services, Pope Gregory XIII on 9 December 1579 appointed Ludovico Taverna as Bishop of Lodi. He was ordained priest on 10 January 1580 and his episcopal consecration followed the next on 12 March in the Sixtine Chapel in Vatican by the hands of cardinal Giovanni Antonio Serbelloni. He moved to his bishopric as required by the canons of the Council of Trent, which guided his actions as bishop.

During his long episcopate he was absent from Lodi twice: in fact he held the office of Apostolic Nuncio to Spain from January 1582 to 11 December 1585 and Apostolic Nuncio to Venice from 26 February 1592 to 23 February 1596.

In 1591 in Lodi he conveyed the second diocesan synod. On 16 April 1594 he was chosen by Pope Clement VIII to baptize Vincenzo Gonzaga, son of the Duke of Mantua. On 26 December 1598 he was appointed Assistant to the papal throne.

He resigned as bishop of Lodi for health reasons in May 1616. After his resignation, he moved to Milan where he lived in the palace now known as Palazzo Isimbardi. He died on 3 June 1617 in Milano, and he was buried in the family chapel in Santa Maria della Passione church. Later, his remains were moved to the Cathedral of Lodi.
