= Seghizzi =

Seghizzi is an Italian surname. Notable people with the surname include:

- Andrea Seghizzi, Italian Baroque painter
- Cecilia Seghizzi (1908–2019), Italian composer
- Michelangelo Seghizzi (1565–1625), Italian Roman Catholic bishop
