= Merisi =

Merisi is a surname. Notable people with the surname include:

- Michelangelo Merisi da Caravaggio (1571–1610), Italian painter
- Emanuele Merisi (born 1972), Italian swimmer
- Giuseppe Merisi (born 1938), Italian bishop
