= Giacomo Capuzzi =

Catholic bishop (1929–2021)

- Emerit Bishop of Diocese of Lodi
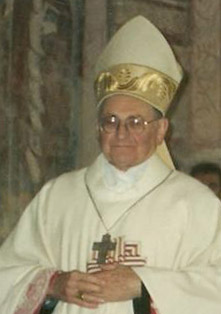
- Capuzzi in 2002
- Church: Roman Catholic Church
- See: Diocese of Lodi
- In office: 1989–2005
- Predecessor: Paolo Magnani
- Successor: Giuseppe Merisi

Orders
- Ordination: 29 June 1952

Personal details
- Born: 14 August 1929 Manerbio, Italy
- Died: 26 December 2021 (aged 92) Brescia, Italy
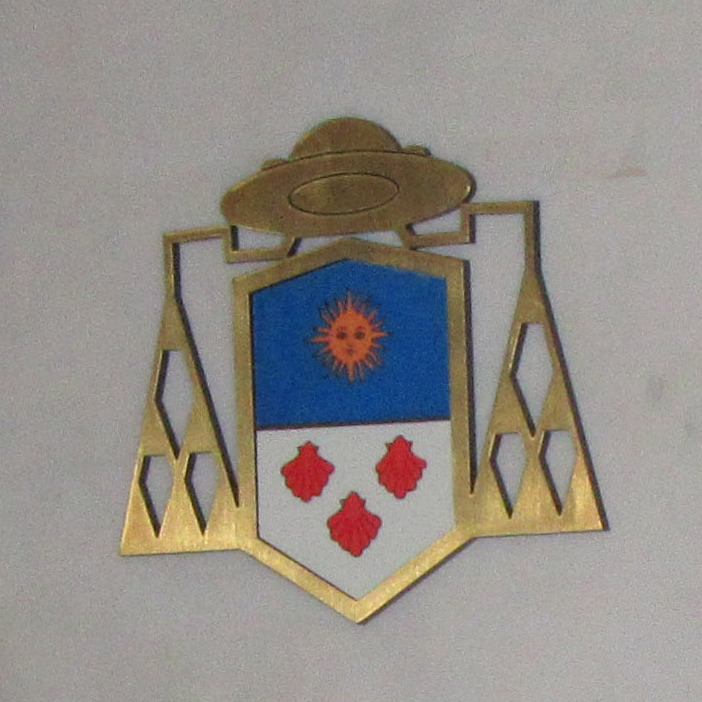
- Coat of arms

Giacomo Capuzzi (14 August 1929 – 26 December 2021) was an Italian Roman Catholic prelate, who served as a bishop of the Roman Catholic Diocese of Lodi.

== Biography ==
Capuzzi was ordained priest on 29 June 1952. He was appointed bishop of Lodi on 7 March 1989. Receiving his episcopal consecration on 30 April 1989 from bishop Bruno Foresti. He replaced the previous bishop of Lodi Paolo Magnani. He resigned on 14 December 2005 and lived in Leno as emerit bishop. He died on 26 December 2021, at the age of 92.

== Gallery ==
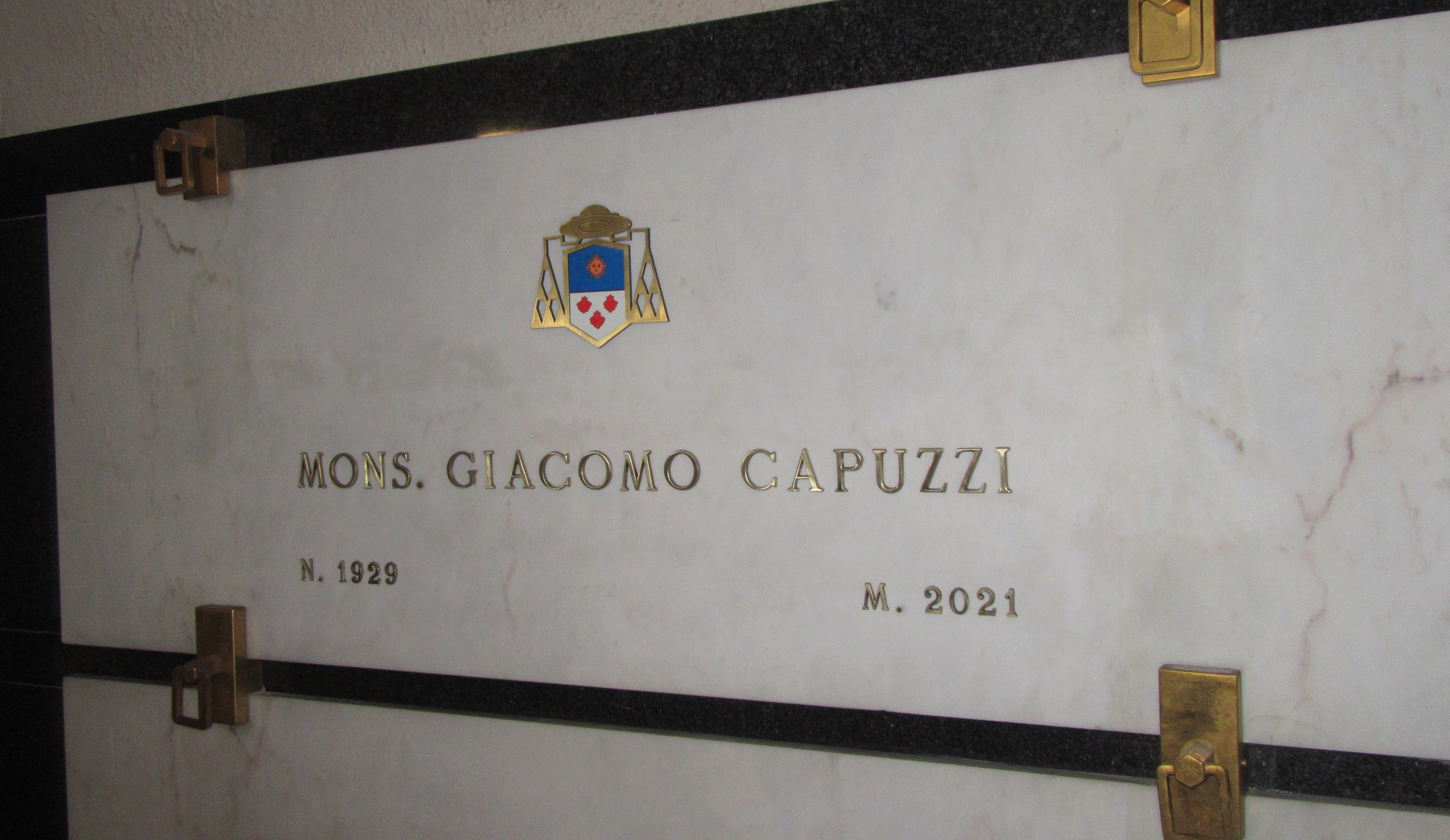
Bishop Capuzzi's grave, in Lodi Cathedral

== Resources ==
- Profile of Mons. Capuzzi www.catholic-hierarchy.org
- Official page of diocese of Lodi
