= Clemente Gera =

Italian Roman Catholic prelate (died 1643)

Most Reverend Clemente Gera
- Bishop of Lodi
- Church: Catholic Church
- Diocese: Diocese of Lodi
- In office: 1625–1643
- Predecessor: Michelangelo Seghizzi
- Successor: Pietro Vidoni
- Previous post: Bishop of Terni (1613–1625)

Orders
- Consecration: 30 November 1613 by Paolo Emilio Sfondrati

Personal details
- Died: 23 November 1643 Lodi, Italy

Clemente Gera (died 23 November 1643) was a Roman Catholic prelate who served as Bishop of Lodi (1625–1643) and Bishop of Terni (1613–1625).

== Biography ==
On 13 November 1613, Clemente Gera was appointed during the papacy of Pope Paul V as Bishop of Terni. On 30 November 1613, he was consecrated bishop by Paolo Emilio Sfondrati, Cardinal-Bishop of Albano, with Antonio d'Aquino, Bishop of Sarno, and Giovanni Ambrogio Caccia, Bishop Emeritus of Castro del Lazio, serving as co-consecrators. On 21 May 1625, he was appointed during the papacy of Pope Urban VIII as Bishop of Lodi. He served as Bishop of Lodi until his death on 23 November 1643.

== External links and additional sources ==
- Cheney, David M. "Diocese of Terni-Narni-Amelia". Catholic-Hierarchy.org. (for Chronology of Bishops) ^{[self-published]}
- Chow, Gabriel. "Diocese of Terni-Narni-Amelia (Italy)". GCatholic.org. (for Chronology of Bishops) ^{[self-published]}
- Cheney, David M. "Diocese of Lodi". Catholic-Hierarchy.org. (for Chronology of Bishops) ^{[self-published]}
- Chow, Gabriel. "Diocese of Lodi (Italy)". GCatholic.org. (for Chronology of Bishops) ^{[self-published]}

Catholic Church titles
Preceded by Ludovico Riva	Bishop of Terni; 1613–1625	Succeeded by Cosimo Mannucci
Preceded by Michelangelo Seghizzi	Bishop of Lodi; 1625–1643	Succeeded by Pietro Vidoni
