= Giulio Sanguineti =

Italian Roman Catholic bishop (1932–2025)

His Excellency Giulio Sanguineti
- Bishop Emeritus of Brescia
- Archdiocese: Milan
- Diocese: Brescia
- Appointed: 19 December 1998
- Term ended: 19 July 2007
- Predecessor: Bruno Foresti
- Successor: Luciano Monari
- Previous posts: Bishop of Savona-Noli (1980–1989); Bishop of La Spezia-Sarzana-Brugnato (1989–1998)

Orders
- Ordination: 29 May 1955 by Francesco Marchesani
- Consecration: 6 January 1981 by Pope John Paul II, Giovanni Canestri and Belchior Joaquim da Silva Neto

Personal details
- Born: 20 February 1932 Lavagna, Italy
- Died: 6 November 2025 (aged 93) Chiavari, Italy
- Motto: In sanguine suo
- Coat of arms

Styles of Giulio Sanguineti
- Reference style: His Excellency; The Most Reverend
- Spoken style: Your Excellency
- Religious style: Bishop

Giulio Sanguineti (20 February 1932 – 6 November 2025) was an Italian Roman Catholic bishop who, from 19 July 2007, became bishop emeritus of Brescia.

== Biography ==
Sanguineti was born in Santa Giulia di Centaura, Lavagna, in the province of Genoa and diocese of Chiavari, on 20 February 1932. He was the youngest of three brothers. On March 20, he was baptized in the church of Santa Giulia di Centaura. He attended the Pontifical Gregorian University where he obtained a degree in canon law.

On 15 December 1980, Pope John Paul II appointed him bishop of Savona and also Noli. Archbishop Giovanni Canestri (later cardinal) and he received episcopal ordination from Bishop Belchior Joaquim da Silva Neto on 6 January 1981 at the Vatican. On 30 September 1986, following the full union of the two dioceses, he became bishop of Savona-Noli.

On 7 December 1989, he was appointed bishop of La Spezia-Sarzana-Brugnato by John Paul II. In 1995, he was elected president of the CEI Commission for social communications; he remained in office until 2000.

On 19 December 1998, Pope John Paul II named him bishop of Brescia and on 28 February 1999, he took possession of the diocese.

On 13 November 2002, at the former Libreria Queriniana of Brescia, he inaugurated the new headquarters of the Centro Oratori Bresciani, aimed at youth ministry in Brescia.

On 19 July 2007, Pope Benedict XVI accepted his letter of resignation, presented due to age limits; Luciano Monari succeeded him, until then bishop of Piacenza-Bobbio.

From 17 September 2007, he lived in Rapallo, but from November 2010, he lived in Santa Giulia di Centaura, his hometown.

Sanguineti died on 6 November 2025, at the age of 93.

Catholic Church titles
| Preceded by Bruno Foresti | Bishop of Brescia; 1998–2007 | Succeeded by Luciano Monari |
| Preceded by Siro Silvestri | Bishop of La Spezia-Sarzana-Brugnato; 1989–1998 | Succeeded by Bassano Staffieri |
| Preceded by Franco Sibilla | Bishop of Savona-Noli; 1980–1989 | Succeeded by Roberto Amadei |
