= Giulio Oggioni =

Italian Catholic prelate

- Bishop of Bergamo
- Church: Catholic Church
- Diocese: Diocese of Bergamo
- In office: 20 May 1977 – 21 November 1991
- Predecessor: Clemente Gaddi
- Successor: Roberto Amadei
- Previous post: Bishop of Lodi (1972-1977)

Orders
- Ordination: 3 June 1939 by Alfredo Ildefonso Schuster
- Consecration: 4 November 1972 by Giovanni Colombo

Personal details
- Born: 15 June 1916 Villasanta, Province of Milan, Kingdom of Italy
- Died: 26 February 1993 (aged 76) Bergamo, Province of Bergamo, Italy

Styles of Giulio Oggioni
- Reference style: The Most Reverend
- Spoken style: Your Excellency
- Religious style: Monsignor
- Posthumous style: none

Giulio Oggioni (1916–1993) was an Italian prelate who led the Diocese of Bergamo from 1977 to 1991.

== Life ==
Born in Villasanta, Oggioni was ordained a priest in 1939. In 1972 Pope Paul VI named him Bishop of Lodi, and in 1977 Pope John Paul II named him bishop of Bergamo. He died on 26 February 1993.

== External links and additional sources ==
- Cheney, David M. "Diocese of Bergamo". Catholic-Hierarchy.org. (for Chronology of Bishops) ^{[self-published]}
- Chow, Gabriel. "Diocese of Bergamo". GCatholic.org. (for Chronology of Bishops) ^{[self-published]}

Catholic Church titles
Preceded by Tarcisio Vincenzo Benedetti	Bishop of Lodi; 1972–1977	Succeeded by Paolo Magnani
Preceded by Clemente Gaddi	Bishop of Bergamo; 1977–1991	Succeeded by Roberto Amadei
