= Bassianus of Lodi =

Italian bishop and saint

Bassianus
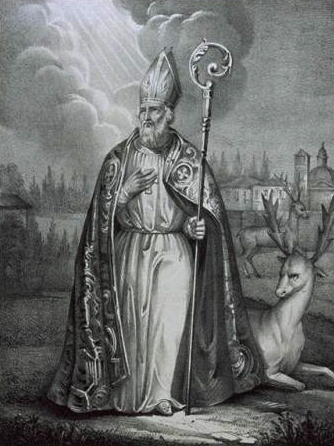
- Born: ~320
- Died: ~413
- Venerated in: Roman Catholic Church, Eastern Orthodox Church
- Feast: January 19
- Attributes: deer; episcopal attire
- Patronage: Lodi

Bassianus of Lodi (Italian: Bassiano di Lodi, Latin: Bassianus Laudensis; c. 320 – 413) was an Italian saint, the patron saint of Lodi, Bassano del Grappa, and Pizzighettone in Italy.

== Biography ==
Born in Syracuse, Sicily, to Sergius, prefect of the city, Bassianus was sent to Rome in order to complete his studies. There, he was converted to Christianity by a priest named Giordano much against his parents' will.

Bassianus's father, who wanted his son to apostatize, asked him to return to Syracuse. Bassianus refused and fled to a relative, Urso, Bishop of Ravenna. There Bassianus took up the life of a hermit near Sant'Apollinare in Classe.

When the bishop of Lodi died around 373, Bassianus was asked to succeed him. He was consecrated bishop by Ambrose of Milan and Urso of Ravenna. Bassianus built a church dedicated to the Apostles, consecrating it in 381 in the presence of Ambrose and Saint Felix of Como. He participated in the Council of Aquileia in 381 and may perhaps have participated in the Council of Milan (390), in which Jovinian was condemned.

Bassianus's signature is found together with Ambrose's on a letter sent to Pope Siricius. In 397, Bassianus was present at the death of his friend Ambrose. Bassianus died around 413. He was known as a caring shepherd and was believed to have the gift of healing the sick.

== Veneration ==
In 1158, when Milanese forces destroyed Lodi, Bassianus' relics were taken to Milan. When, however, Frederick Barbarossa intervened and decreed the rebuilding of Lodi, the relics were returned in 1163 and enshrined in the Cathedral of the Assumption of the Blessed Virgin Mary in Lodi, where they are still revered in the crypt.

Bassianus is the patron saint of Lodi and is invoked against leprosy. His feast day is January 19, the occasion of the St. Bassianus’ Fair in Lodi.
