= Felix of Como =

Bishop and saint

Felix of Como (died on October 8, 391 AD) is venerated as the first bishop of Como.

He was a friend of Ambrose, who praised him for his missionary activity and ordained him a priest in 379, and a bishop in 386. When Bassianus of Lodi built a church dedicated to the Apostles at Lodi, he consecrated it in the presence of Ambrose and Felix.

Felix is honored as a zealous pastor of souls. His feast day is 8 October.
