= Pietro Vidoni =

Catholic cardinal

- Bishop of Lodi
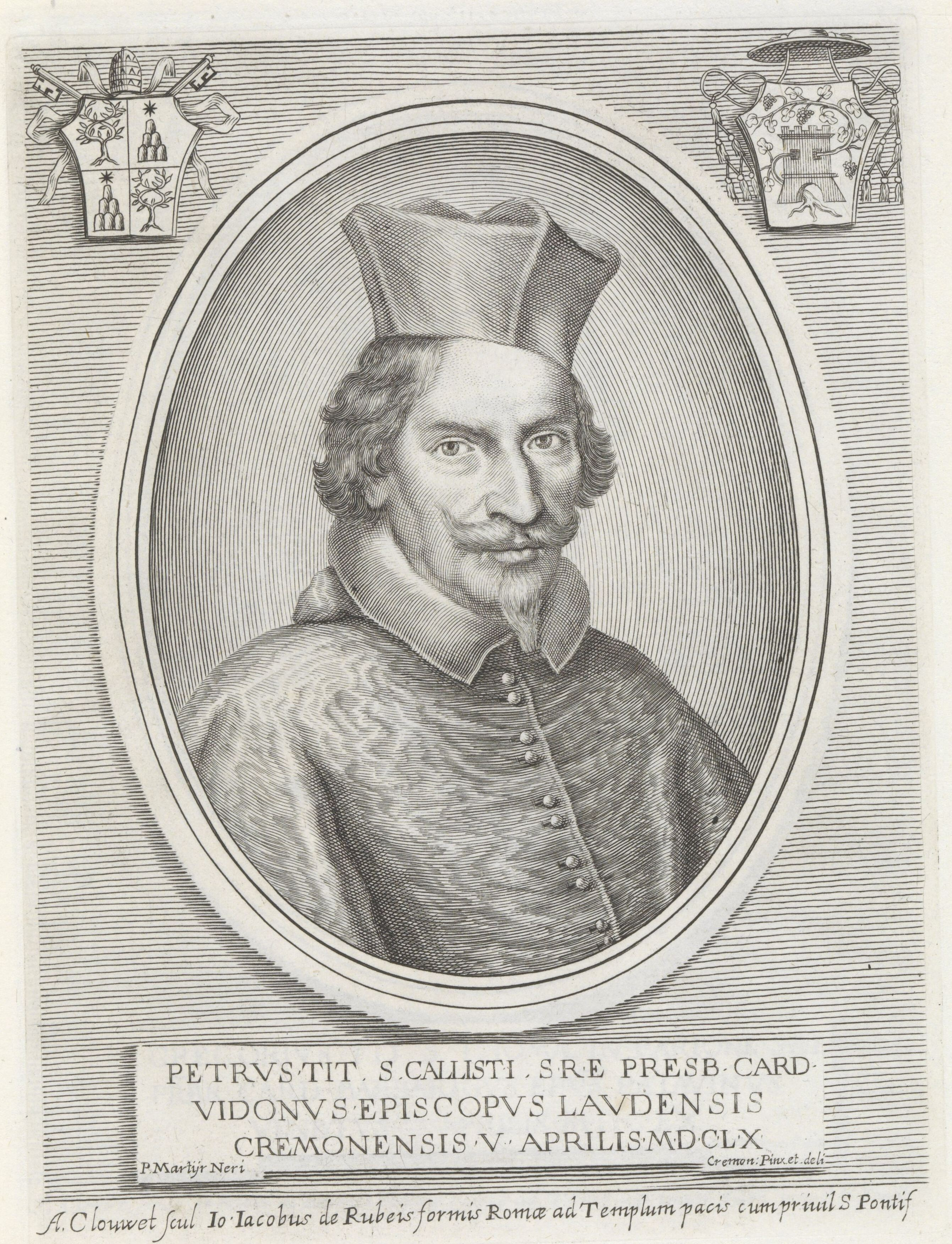
- PIetro Vidoni (c. 1660)
- Church: Catholic Church
- Diocese: Diocese of Lodi
- In office: 13 July 1644 – 16 June 1669
- Predecessor: Clemente Gera
- Successor: Serafino Corio
- Other post: Cardinal-Priest of San Pancrazio (1673-1681)
- Previous posts: Cardinal-Priest of San Callisto (1661-1673); Apostolic Nuncio to the Kingdom of Poland and the Grand Duchy of Lithuania (1652-1660)

Orders
- Consecration: 9 October 1644 by Giovanni Battista Maria Pallotta
- Created cardinal: 5 April 1660 by Pope Alexander VII

Personal details
- Born: 8 November 1610 Cremona, Duchy of Milan
- Died: 5 January 1681 (aged 70) Rome, Papal States

Pietro Vidoni (8 November 1610 – 5 January 1681) was an Italian cardinal who served from 1652 to 1660 as the papal legate and nuncio to Poland.

== Personal life ==
Vidoni was born 8 November 1610 in Cremona into Italian noble family. He studied at several Italian colleges, including the Collegio Nazareno in Rome, and received his doctorate, before moving to Rome and pursuing an ecclesiastical career.

== Ecclesiastical service ==
During the pontificate of Pope Urban VIII, Vidoni was appointed as the governor of Rimini, Tivoli, Sabina, Orvieto and Spoleto.

On 30 May 1652, Vidoni was appointed Apostolic Nuncio from Pope Innocent X to King John II Casimir Vasa of Poland, a position he held until his elevation to Cardinal in 1660. He was caught in the invasion of Poland by King Gustavus Adolfus of Sweden.

He conducted the holy mass in the Latin Cathedral of Lwów, during which Polish King John II Casimir had taken the Lwów Oath.

== Cardinalate ==
Returning to Italy, he was elevated to cardinal by pope Alexander VII, in the consistory of 5 April 1660. In 1661 he was given the titular church of San Callisto. In 1662 he was a legate in Bologna.

In 1667 he participated in the papal conclave which elected Pope Clement IX. He also participated in the conclave of 1669-1670 which elected Pope Clement X and the conclave of 1676, which elected Pope Innocent XI.

Between 1675 and 1676 he served a term as the Camerlengo of the Sacred College of Cardinals.

== Death and burial ==
He died in Rome on 5 January 1681 and was buried in the basilica of Santa Maria della Vittoria.
