= Tarcisio Vincenzo Benedetti =

- Bishop of Roman Catholic Diocese of Lodi
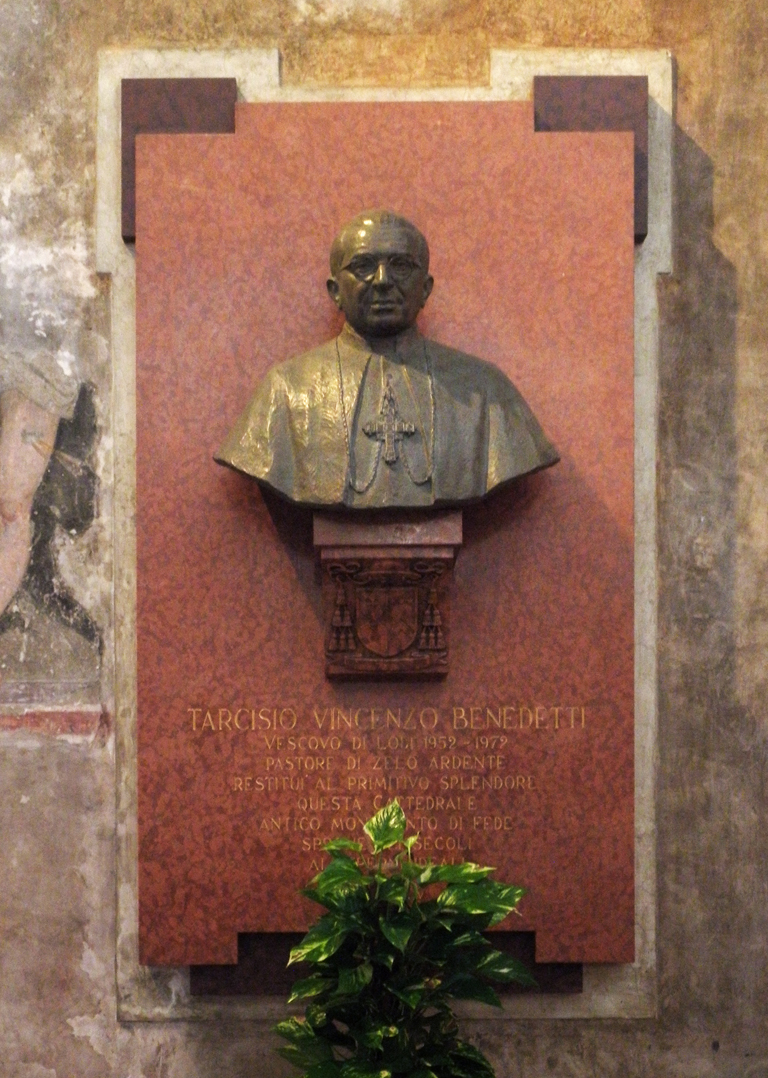
- Church: Roman Catholic Church
- See: Diocese of Lodi
- In office: 1952 - 1972
- Predecessor: Pietro Calchi Novati
- Successor: Giulio Oggioni

Orders
- Ordination: 17 July 1927

Personal details
- Born: 28 October 1899 Treviolo
- Died: 24 May 1972 (aged 72) Lodi, Italy

Tarcisio Vincenzo Benedetti (28 October 1899 – 24 May 1972) was the Italian Bishop of the Roman Catholic Diocese of Lodi from his appointment by Pope Pius XII on 11 November 1952 until his death on 24 May 1972.

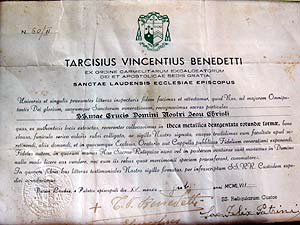
Document located at Basilica of Aparecida with the signature of bishop Tarcisio Vincenzo Benedetti

Benedetti was ordained a Catholic priest on 17 July 1927. He was appointed Auxiliary Bishop of Sabina-Poggio Mirteto on 10 June 1949 and was ordained titular Bishop of Ierichus on 3 July 1949.

He was appointed bishop of Lodi on 10 July 1952.

Bishop Tarcisio Vincenzo Benedetti died on 24 May 1972, at the age of 72.

== Resources ==
- Profile of Mons. Benedetti www.catholic-hierarchy.org
- Official page of diocese of Lodi
