= Domenico Maria Gelmini =

Italian Roman Catholic bishop

- Bishop of Lodi
- Church: Catholic Church
- Diocese: Diocese of Lodi
- In office: 24 November 1871 – 25 January 1888
- Predecessor: Gaetano Benaglia
- Successor: Giovanni Battista Rota

Orders
- Ordination: 18 September 1830
- Consecration: 26 November 1871 by Costantino Patrizi Naro

Personal details
- Born: 29 December 1807 Ossago, Department of Upper Po, Kingdom of Italy, French Republic
- Died: 25 January 1888 (aged 80)

Domenico Maria Gelmini (29 December 1807 − 25 January 1888) was an Italian Roman Catholic bishop.

Ordained to the priesthood on 18 September 1830, Gelmini was named bishop of the Roman Catholic Diocese of Lodi, Italy in November 1871 and died on 25 January 1888 while still in office.
