= San Bartolomeo, Marne =

Catholic church in Marne, Italy

Coordinates: 45°37′25″N 9°33′29″E

San Bartolomeo
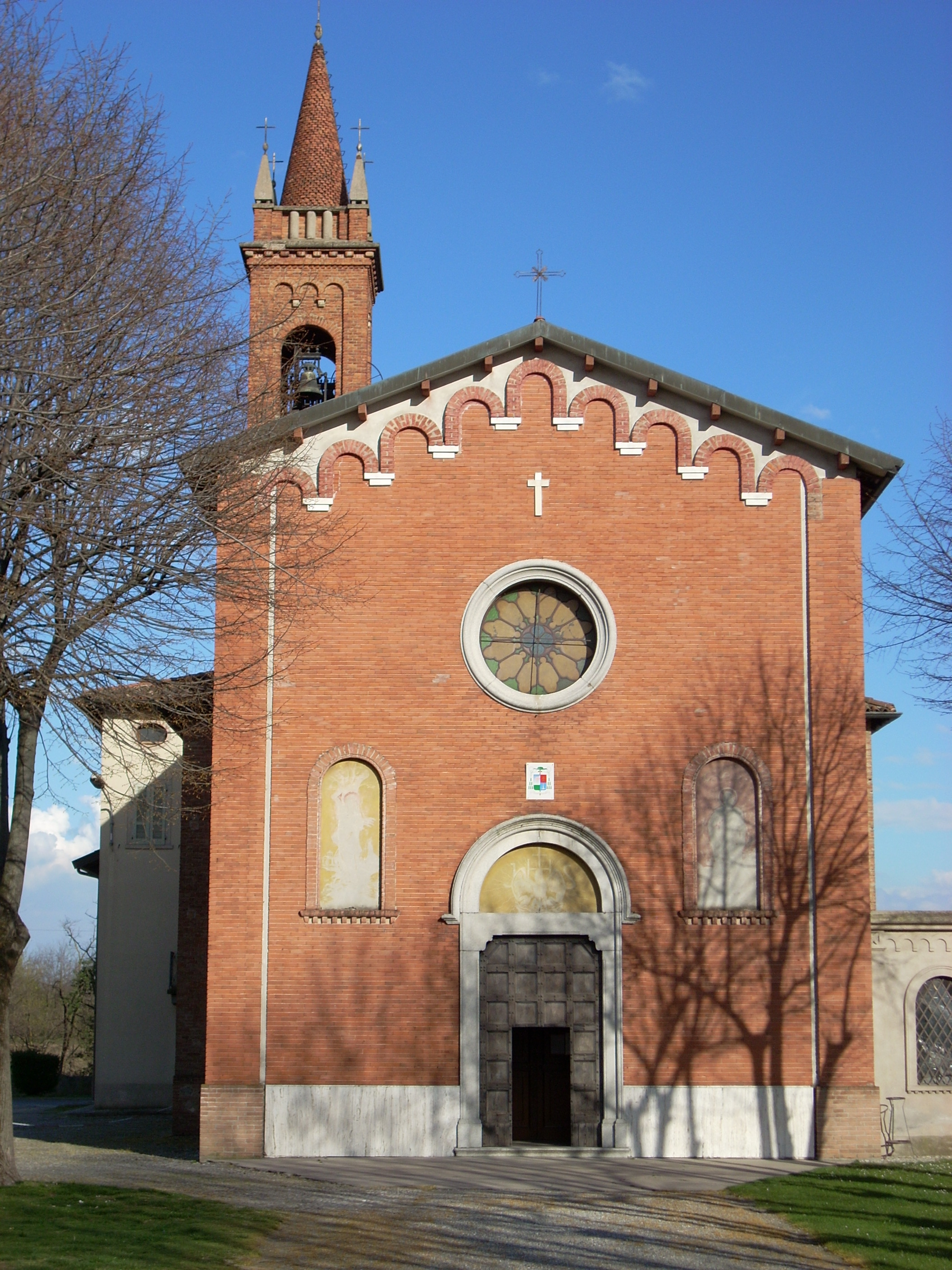

Religion
- Affiliation: Roman Catholic
- Status: Active

Location
- Location: Marne, Italy
- Interactive map of San Bartolomeo

Architecture
- Type: Church
- Completed: 12th century

San Bartolomeo (Bartholomew the Apostle) is a church in Marne, Italy. It was an independent parish until the village of Marne became a municipality.

== History ==
It is a building of the first half of 12th century; today only the apse of the original structure survives. The architectural structure of the building has a nave culminating in the apse that contains some frescoes whose age is difficult to determine.

The church underwent some renovations and expansion in the nineteenth and twentieth centuries. The apse was restored between 1984 and 1988.

== Bibliography ==
- Kubach, Hans Erich. Architettura romanica, Milano, Electa, 1978, ISBN 88-435-2474-7
- Le Goff, Jacques, L'uomo medievale, Laterza, 1999, ISBN 88-420-4197-1
- Labaa, Gian Maria. San Tomè in Almenno. Studi, ricerche, interventi per il restauro di una chiesa romanica. Bergamo, Lubrina, 2005, ISBN 88-7766-312-X
- Moris, Lorenzo and Alessandro Pellegrini. Sulle tracce del romanico in provincia di Bergamo, Bergamo, Prov. Bergamo, 2003
- Keller, Raffaella Poggiani; Filli Rossi; and Jim Bishop. Carta archeologica della Lombardia: carta archeologica del territorio di Bergamo. Modena, Panini, 1992. ISBN 88-7686-210-2
- Tosco, Carlo. Architetti e committenti nel romanico lombardo, Roma, Viella, 1997, ISBN 88-85669-54-9
- Labaa, Pino Capellini Giovan Maria. Itinerari dell'anno Mille, Bergamo, Sesab éditrice

== Gallery ==
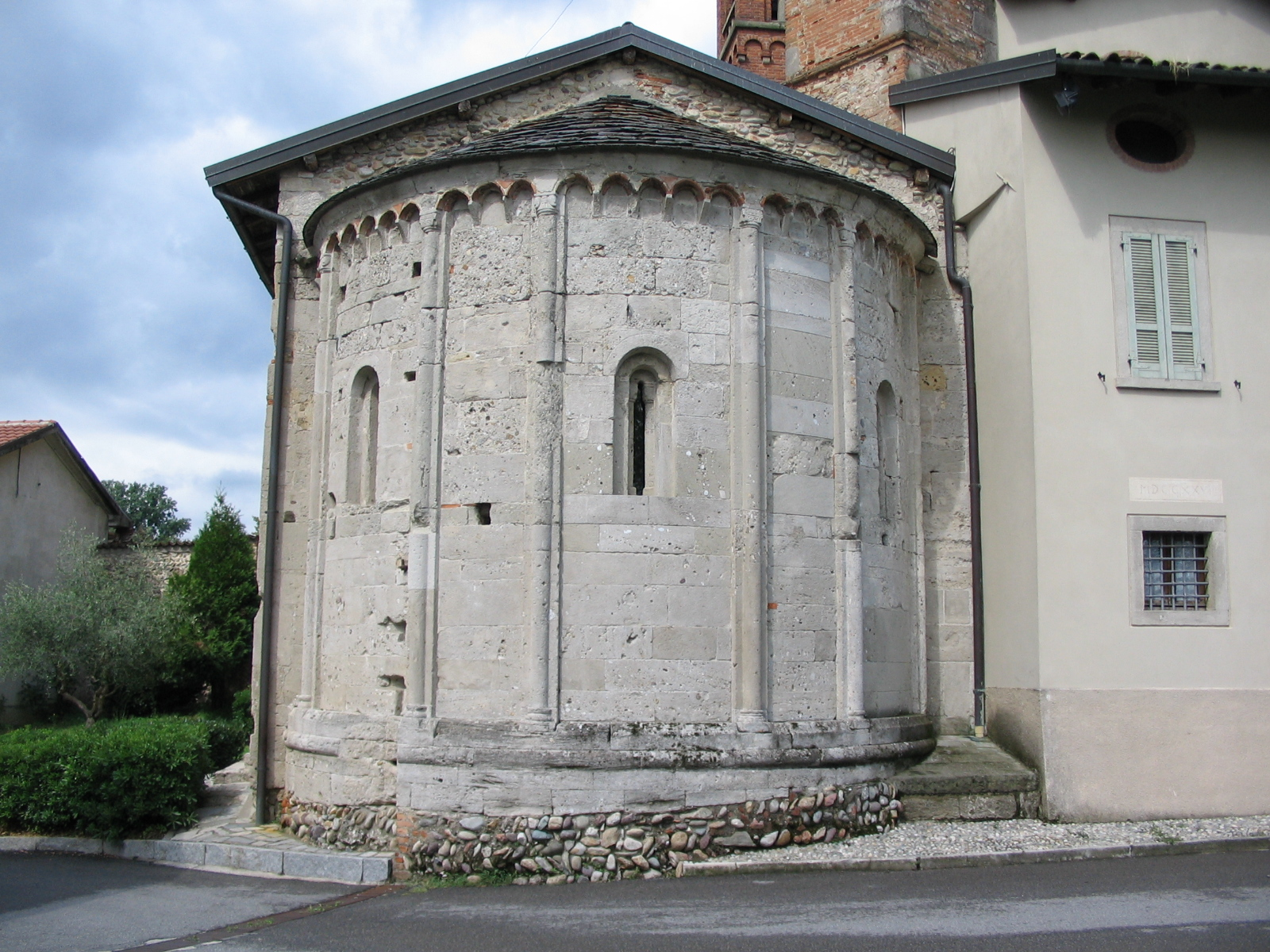
The apse

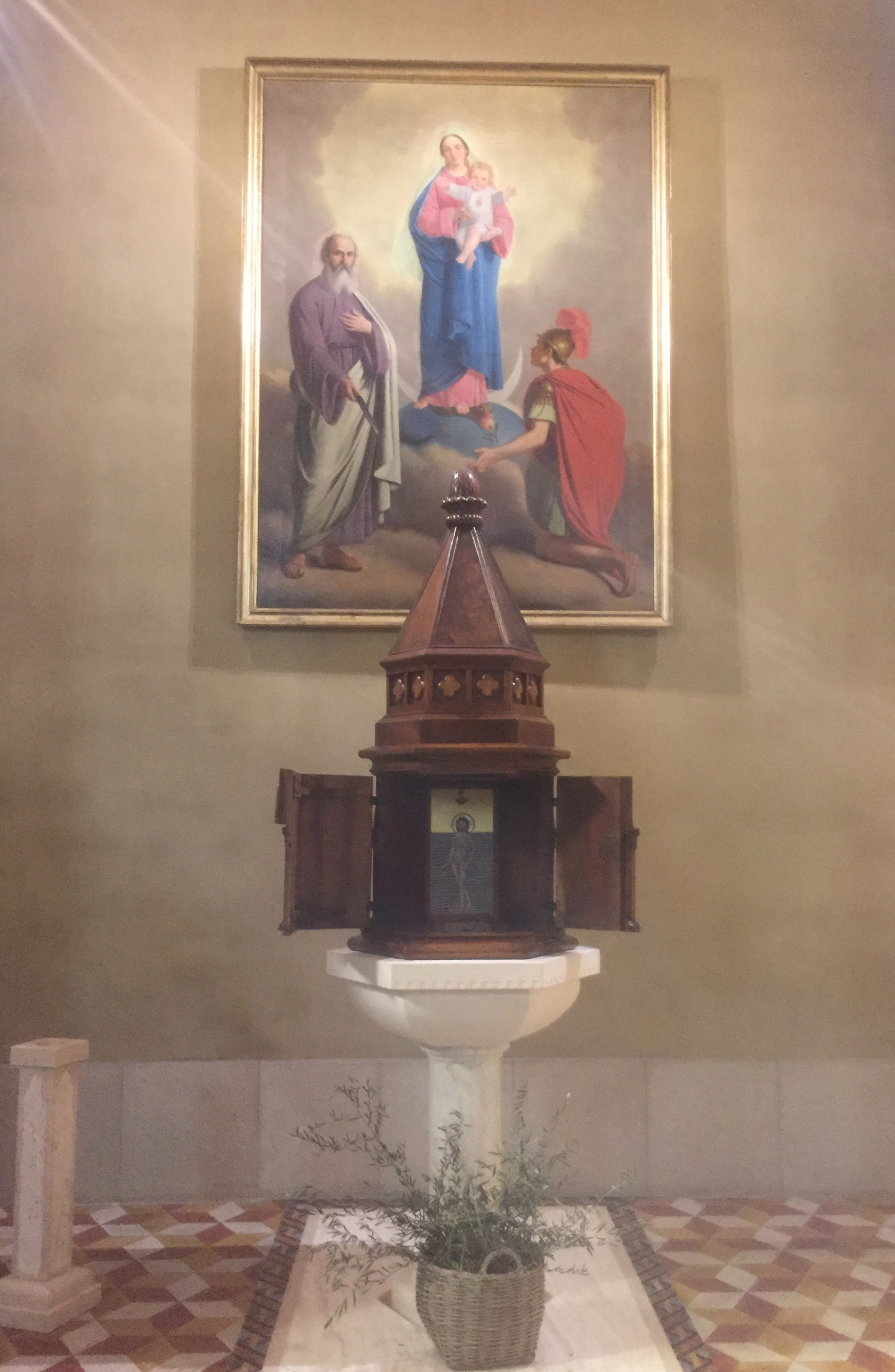
The baptismal font where bishop Maurizio Malvestiti was baptized
