= Francesco Beschi =

Italian Catholic bishop

His Excellency Francesco Beschi
- Bishop of Bergamo
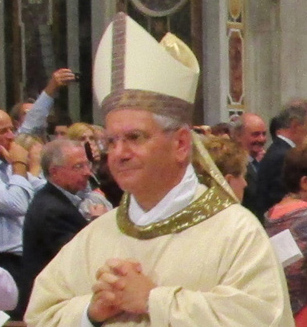
- Bishop Beschi in 2014
- Church: Roman Catholic Church
- Diocese: Bergamo
- Predecessor: Roberto Amadei, Eduardo Boza-Masvidal (Vinda)
- Successor: TBD

Orders
- Ordination: 7 June 1975 by Luigi Morstabilini
- Consecration: 18 May 2003 by Giulio Sanguineti

Personal details
- Born: 6 August 1951 (age 75) Brescia
- Coat of arms

Francesco Beschi (born 6 August 1951 in Brescia) is the current bishop of Bergamo.

== Life ==
Francesco Beschi was born to a railroad worker and his wife. He grew up in Brescia and joined the seminary of his diocese in his youth. He became a priest in 1975 and for 12 years he was a parish priest in two parishes of Brescia. From 1987 he held various positions in the diocesan curia of the Diocese of Brescia. On 18 May 2003 he was consecrated as titular bishop of Vinda and assumed the duty as auxiliary bishop of Brescia. On 22 January 2009 he was appointed by Pope Benedict XVI as bishop of Bergamo and on 15 March the same year he began his ministry as bishop of Bergamo. In 2011 he led the funeral of murdered teenager Yara Gambirasio.

== External links and additional sources ==
- Cheney, David M. "Diocese of Bergamo". Catholic-Hierarchy.org. (for Chronology of Bishops) ^{[self-published]}
- Chow, Gabriel. "Diocese of Bergamo". GCatholic.org. (for Chronology of Bishops) ^{[self-published]}

Catholic Church titles
Preceded by Roberto Amadei	Bishop of Bergamo; 2009 -	Succeeded by incumbent
