= Giuseppe Gallarati =

Italian Catholic bishop

- Bishop of Lodi
- Gallarati c. 1765
- Church: Catholic Church
- Diocese: Lodi
- Appointed: 18 April 1742
- Term ended: 14 April 1765
- Predecessor: Carlo Ambrogio Mezzabarba
- Successor: Salvatore Andriani

Orders
- Consecration: 25 April 1742 by Pope Benedict XIV

Personal details
- Born: 19 March 1695 Milan, Duchy of Milan
- Died: 1 July 1767 (aged 72)
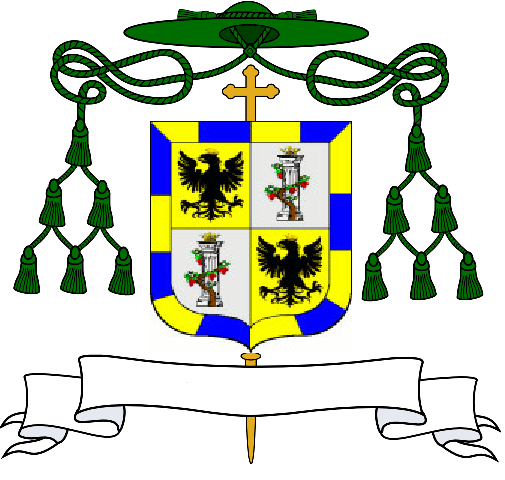
- Coat of arms: Giuseppe Gallarati's coat of arms

Ordination history
History
Episcopal consecration
- Principal consecrator: Pope Benedict XIV
- Co-consecrators: Antonio Maria Pallavicini, Carlo Alberto Guidoboni Cavalchini

Giuseppe Gallarati (19 March 1695 – 1 July 1767) was an Italian Roman Catholic prelate. He served as the bishop of the Diocese of Lodi from 1742 to 1767.
