= Roberto Amadei =

- Bishop of Bergamo
- Church: Catholic Church
- Diocese: Diocese of Bergamo
- In office: 21 November 1991 – 22 January 2009
- Predecessor: Giulio Oggioni
- Successor: Francesco Beschi
- Previous post: Bishop of Savona-Noli (1990-1991)

Orders
- Ordination: 16 March 1957 by Giuseppe Piazzi
- Consecration: 2 June 1990 by Giulio Oggioni

Personal details
- Born: 13 February 1933 Verdello, Province of Bergamo, Kingdom of Italy
- Died: 29 December 2009 (aged 76) Bergamo, Province of Bergamo, Italy

Styles of Roberto Amadei
- Reference style: The Most Reverend
- Spoken style: Your Excellency
- Religious style: Monsignor
- Posthumous style: none

Roberto Amadei (13 February 1933 – 29 December 2009) was an Italian Roman Catholic prelate who served as a bishop of the diocese of Bergamo, Italy.

== Biography ==
Amadei was born in Verdello, a small town near Bergamo in Lombardy. In 1944 he joined the minor seminary at Clusone where he earned the equivalent of a high school diploma. Subsequently, he was enrolled in the major seminary in Rome.

He took Holy Orders and became a priest on 16 March 1957. After his ordination, he remained in Rome until he had completed a comprehensive course of study in church history at the Gregorian University.

From 1960 to 1990, he taught church history at the seminary of Bergamo. During his tenure as a teacher there, he was also the headmaster of the theology school from 1969 to 1981. Bishop Giulio Oggioni named him rector of the seminary in 1981.

In 1991, Pope John Paul II named Monsignor Amadei to be Bishop of Savona, and, in 1993, he was transferred to the Diocese of Bergamo as bishop. On 22 January 2009 pope Benedict XVI accept his resignation from the post of bishop of Bergamo and named him Apostolic administrator sede vacante. Amadei left the office of administrator on 15 March 2009 when his successor Francesco Beschi began his service as bishop of Bergamo. On 10 October Francesco Beschi announced that Amadei has received the Anointing of the Sick. He died on 29 December 2009 in Bergamo.

== External links and additional sources ==
- Cheney, David M. "Diocese of Bergamo". Catholic-Hierarchy.org. (for Chronology of Bishops) ^{[self-published]}
- Chow, Gabriel. "Diocese of Bergamo". GCatholic.org. (for Chronology of Bishops) ^{[self-published]}

Catholic Church titles
Preceded by Giulio Oggioni	Bishop of Bergamo; 1993–2009	Succeeded by Francesco Beschi
