= Carlo Pallavicino (bishop) =

Most Reverend Carlo Pallavicino
- Bishop of Lodi
- Church: Catholic Church
- Diocese: Diocese of Lodi
- In office: 1456–1497
- Predecessor: Antonio Bernieri (bishop)
- Successor: Ottaviano Maria Sforza

Carlo Pallavicino (died 1497) was a Roman Catholic prelate who served as Bishop of Lodi (1456–1497).

On 21 June 1456, Carlo Pallavicino was appointed during the papacy of Pope Alexander VI as Bishop of Lodi. He served as Bishop of Lodi until his death in 1497.

== External links and additional sources ==
- Cheney, David M. "Diocese of Lodi". Catholic-Hierarchy.org. (for Chronology of Bishops) ^{[self-published]}
- Chow, Gabriel. "Diocese of Lodi (Italy)". GCatholic.org. (for Chronology of Bishops) ^{[self-published]}

Catholic Church titles
Preceded by Antonio Bernieri (bishop)	Bishop of Lodi; 1456–1497	Succeeded by Ottaviano Maria Sforza
