= Bruno Foresti =

Roman Catholic prelate (1923–2022)

His Excellency Bruno Foresti
- Bishop Emeritus of Brescia
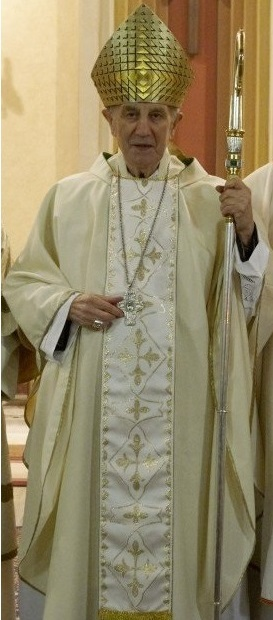
- Photo of the bishop
- Archdiocese: Milan
- See: Roman Catholic Diocese of Brescia
- Appointed: 15 June 1983
- Term ended: 19 December 1998
- Predecessor: Luigi Morstabilini
- Successor: Giulio Sanguineti
- Previous posts: Auxiliary Bishop of Modena-Nonantola and Titular Bishop of Plestia (1974–1976); Archbishop of Modena-Nonantola (1976–1983)

Orders
- Ordination: 7 April 1946 by Adriano Bernareggi
- Consecration: 10 January 1975 by Clemente Gaddi

Personal details
- Born: 6 May 1923 Tavernola Bergamasca, Italy
- Died: 26 July 2022 (aged 99) Gavardo, Italy

Bruno Foresti (6 May 1923 – 26 July 2022) was an Italian prelate of the Catholic Church. At the time of his death at age 99, he was the oldest living Catholic bishop from Italy.

Foresti was born in Tavernola Bergamasca, Italy and was ordained a priest on 7 April 1946. Foresti was appointed auxiliary bishop to the Archdiocese of Modena-Nonantola on 12 December 1974 as well as Titular Bishop of Plestia and ordained bishop on 10 January 1975. Foresti was then appointed Archbishop of the Archdiocese of Modena-Nonantola on 2 April 1976. Foresti's final appointment was bishop of the Diocese of Brescia, and he retired as bishop of Brescia on 15 December 1998.

Catholic Church titles
Preceded by Luigi Morstabilini	Bishop of Brescia; 1983–1998	Succeeded by Giulio Sanguineti
Preceded by Giuseppe Amici	Archbishop of Modena-Nonantola; 1976–1983	Succeeded by Santo Bartolomeo Quadri
Preceded by Leo Christopher Byrne	Titular Bishop of Plestia; 1974–1976	Succeeded by Bolesław Filipiak
Preceded by —	Auxiliary Bishop of Modena-Nonantola; 1974–1976	Succeeded by —
