= Michelangelo Seghizzi =

Most Reverend Michelangelo Seghizzi
- Bishop of Lodi
- Church: Catholic Church
- Diocese: Diocese of Lodi
- In office: 1616–1625
- Predecessor: Ludovico Taverna
- Successor: Clemente Gera

Orders
- Consecration: 26 June 1616 by Giovanni Garzia Mellini

Personal details
- Born: 1565 Lodi, Italy
- Died: March 1625 (age 60) Lodi, Italy

Michelangelo Seghizzi, O.P. (1565 – March 1625) was a Roman Catholic prelate who served as Bishop of Lodi (1616–1625).

== Biography ==
Michelangelo Seghizzi was born in Lodi, Italy in 1565 and ordained a priest in the Order of Preachers. On 13 June 1616, he was appointed during the papacy of Pope Paul V as Bishop of Lodi. On 26 June 1616, he was consecrated bishop by Giovanni Garzia Mellini, Cardinal-Priest of Santi Quattro Coronati, with Ulpiano Volpi, Archbishop Emeritus of Chieti, and Alessandro Guidiccioni (iuniore), Bishop of Lucca, serving as co-consecrators. He served as Bishop of Lodi until his death in March 1625.

== External links and additional sources ==
- Cheney, David M. "Diocese of Lodi". Catholic-Hierarchy.org. (for Chronology of Bishops) ^{[self-published]}
- Chow, Gabriel. "Diocese of Lodi (Italy)". GCatholic.org. (for Chronology of Bishops) ^{[self-published]}

Catholic Church titles
Preceded by Ludovico Taverna	Bishop of Lodi; 1616–1625	Succeeded by Clemente Gera
