= Antonio Bernieri (bishop) =

Former Bishop of Lodi

Most Reverend Antonio Bernieri
- Bishop of Lodi
- Church: Catholic Church
- Diocese: Diocese of Lodi
- In office: 1435–1456
- Predecessor: Gerardo Landriani
- Successor: Carlo Pallavicino (bishop)

Personal details
- Died: 29 May 1456 Lodi, Italy

Antonio Bernieri (died 1456) was a Roman Catholic prelate who served as Bishop of Lodi (1435–1456).

== Biography ==
On 7 June 1435, Antonio Bernieri was appointed during the papacy of Pope Alexander VI as Bishop of Lodi. He served as Bishop of Lodi until his death on 29 May 1456. While bishop, he was the principal consecrator of Jacopo-Antonio dalla Torre, Bishop of Reggio Emilia (1439).

== External links and additional sources ==
- Cheney, David M. "Diocese of Lodi". Catholic-Hierarchy.org. (for Chronology of Bishops) ^{[self-published]}
- Chow, Gabriel. "Diocese of Lodi (Italy)". GCatholic.org. (for Chronology of Bishops) ^{[self-published]}

Catholic Church titles
Preceded by Gerardo Landriani	Bishop of Lodi; 1435–1456	Succeeded by Carlo Pallavicino (bishop)
