= Giuseppe Merisi =

Italian Catholic bishop

- Bishop emeritus of Diocese of Lodi
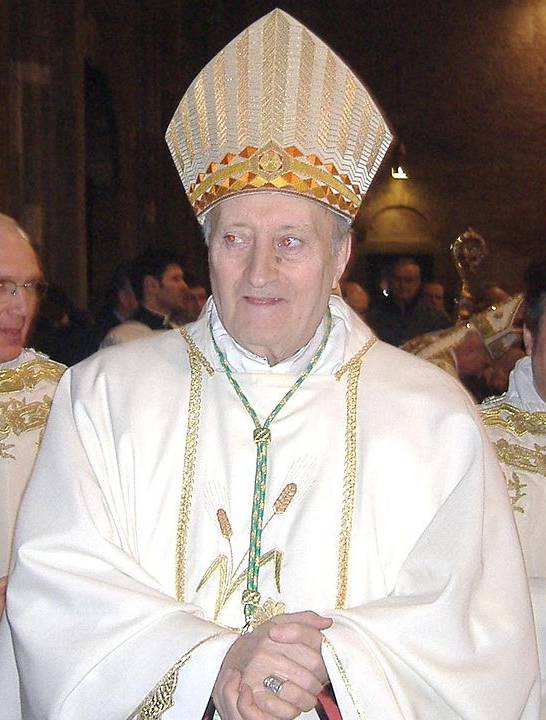
- Church: Roman Catholic Church
- See: Diocese of Lodi
- In office: 2005–2014
- Predecessor: Giacomo Capuzzi
- Successor: Maurizio Malvestiti

Orders
- Ordination: February 22, 1971

Personal details
- Born: September 25, 1938 (age 86); Treviglio

Giuseppe Merisi (born September 25, 1938 in Treviglio) is the emeritus bishop of the Roman Catholic Diocese of Lodi.

== Biography ==
He was ordained a priest on February 22, 1971.

He was appointed auxiliary bishop of Milan and titular Bishop of Drusiliana on September 8, 1995. Merisi received his episcopal consecration on November 4, 1995 from cardinal Carlo Maria Martini.

He was appointed bishop of Lodi on November 14, 2005 and was installed in the diocese on December 17, 2005.

He replaced the previous bishop of Lodi Giacomo Capuzzi and took retirement on 26 August 2014.

== Career ==
- President of the "Commissione Episcopale per il servizio della carità e la salute"
- President of the "Caritas Italiana" (Italian Caritas)
- President of the "Consulta Nazionale per la pastorale della sanità"
- President of the "Consulta Ecclesiale degli organismi socio-assistenziali"

== Resources ==
- Profile of Mons. Merisi
- Official site of Lodi's Diocese
