= Diocese of Lodi =

Roman Catholic diocese in Italy

Coordinates: 45.3167°N 9.5000°E

Diocese of Lodi Dioecesis Laudensis

Catholic
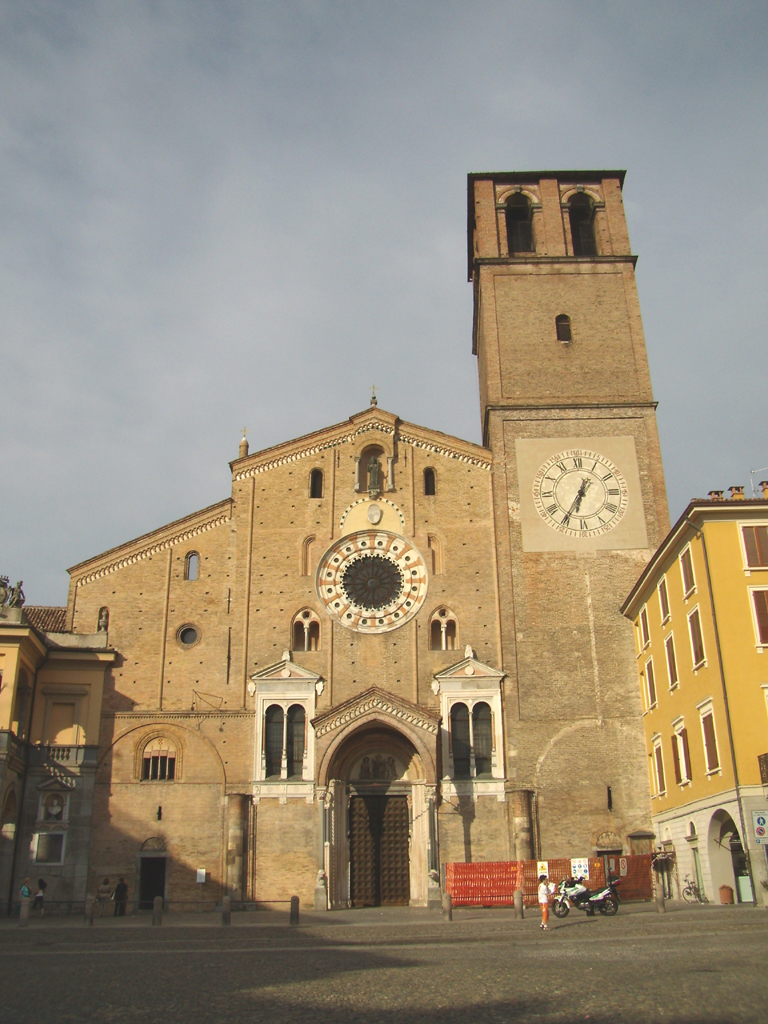
- Lodi Cathedral

Location
- Country: Italy
- Ecclesiastical province: Milan

Statistics
- Area: 894 km^{2} (345 sq mi)
- Population: Total; Catholics: (as of 2023); 284,645 ▼; 268,941 ▼ (94.5%)
- Parishes: 123

Information
- Denomination: Catholic Church
- Sui iuris church: Latin Church
- Rite: Roman Rite
- Established: 4th century
- Cathedral: Basilica Cattedrale di Santa Maria Assunta
- Secular priests: 148 (diocesan) ▼11 (Religious Orders); 6 Permanent Deacons ▲

Current leadership
- Pope: Leo XIV
- Bishop: Maurizio Malvestiti
- Vicar General: Bassiano Uggè
- Bishops emeritus: Giuseppe Merisi

Map

Website
- www.diocesi.lodi.it

The Diocese of Lodi (Latin: Dioecesis Laudensis) is a Latin diocese of the Catholic Church that existed since the 4th century; it is a suffragan of the Archdiocese of Milan.

== History ==
Under Diocletian, according to the local legend, 4000 Christians with their bishop, whose name is unknown, were burned alive in their church. The diocese of Lodi and its bishop, Maurizio Malvestiti, reject the tale, naming Bassianus as their "protovescovo".

The actual origins of the diocese are obscure. Some name Bassianus as the first bishop, others name Julianus, whose time of service is equally obscure. St. Bassianus, the patron of the city of Lodi, was certainly bishop in 378.

Lodi was finally captured by the Milanese in the last week of May 1191.

On 9 January 1252, Pope Innocent IV restored the diocese of Lodi, which had been suppressed by Pope Gregory IX. In a separate document of 26 January 1252, Pope Innocent ordered Bishop Bongiovanni Fissiraga to confiscate all the benefices and fiefs of clergy and laity who had supported the Emperor Frederick II.

In 1298 Bishop Berardus Talente (1296–1307) became the first bishop of Lodi to assume the title of Count.

The episcopal palace was built in the 1730s by Patriarch Carlo Ambrogio Mezzabarba (1725–1741).

=== Synods, provincial and diocesan ===
Bishop Raimundus Sommaripa, O.P. (1289–1296) took part in the provincial synod held on 27 November 1271, by Archbishop Otto Visconti of Milan, for the purpose of aid to the Holy Land. The Siege of Acre (1291) had just ended, with the collapse of Christian power in the Levant. Pope Nicholas IV had written letters to all the archbishops, instructing them to hold such synods. Bishop Aegidius dall' Aqua (1307–1312) was represented by the Archpriest Pagazani at the provincial synod of Milan, held at Bergamo on 5 July 1311, under the presidency of Archbishop Castano Turriano.

A diocesan synod was an irregularly held, but important, meeting of the bishop of a diocese and his clergy. Its purpose was to proclaim generally the various decrees already issued by the bishop, to discuss and ratify measures on which the bishop chose to consult with his clergy, and to publish statutes and decrees of the diocesan synod, of the provincial synod, and of the Holy See.

In 1364, Bishop Paolo Cadamosto (1354–1387) held a diocesan synod pro tuendis ecclesiae suae legibus.

Bishop Ludovico Taverna (1579–1616) presided over a diocesan synod in 1591. The third diocesan synod was held by Bishop Michelangelo Seghizzi, O.P. (1616–1625) in 1619. Bishop Clemente Gera (1625–1643) held a diocesan synod in 1637. A diocesan synod took place in 1657, presided over by Bishop Pietro Vidoni (1644–1669). Bishop Bartolomeo Menatti (1673–1702) presided over the sixth diocesan synod in Lodi on 28–30 March 1689.

Bishop Giuseppe Gallarati (1742–1765) held the seventh diocesan synod in Lodi on 9–11 June 1755. Bishop Gaetano Benaglia (1837–1868) held the eighth diocesan synod in Lodi on 29–31 August 1854. Bishop Giovanni Battista Rota (1888–1913) presided over the ninth diocesan synod on 28–30 September 1896.

The tenth diocesan synod was held by Bishop Pietro Calchi Novati (1927–1952) on 27–29 October 1931; and another, the diocese's twelfth, on 16–17 October 1951.

The fourteenth diocesan synod, embracing themes of evangelization advocated by Pope Francis, took place, after more than ten years' preparation, in January 2020, under the leadership of Bishop Maurizio Malvestiti.

=== Chapter and cathedral ===
After the complete destruction of Lodi (Laus Pompeia) in 1111, a new cathedral was begun on 3 August 1158. In January of that year, every inhabitant of Lodi above the age of fifteen had been required to swear fidelity to Milan. Those who had refused, were expelled on 22 April 1153. The cathedral was completed, except for the façade, in 1163, and the remains of Bishop Bassianus reburied in the crypt, in the presence of Antipope Victor IV and the Emperor Frederick Barbarossa. Originally dedicated to Bassianus, the new cathedral acquired the dedication to the taking up (Assumption) of the physical body of the Virgin Mary into heaven. Bishop Alberico di Merlino (1160–1168), who had joined the imperial schism, was excommunicated by Cardinal Joannes de Anagnia, the papal Legate, on 12 March 1160. Albericus was expelled from Lodi by the forces of Pope Alexander III in 1168.

In 1617, the cathedral Chapter was composed of five dignities and nineteen Canons. In 1717, there were four dignities (Provost, Archdeacon, Cantor, and Archpriest) and fourteen Canons, one of whom was responsible for the souls of the parishioners of the cathedral.

In 1817, in accordance with the decree of 8 June 1805, promulgated by Napoleon, King of Italy and Emperor of the French, the cathedral Chapter of Lodi consisted of one dignity, the Archpriest, and eight Canons, two of whom were designated the Theologus and the Penitentiarius, in accordance with the decrees of the Council of Trent.

== Bishops of Lodi ==
=== to 1200 ===
...

- Julianus (date unknown)

...

- Bassianus (378-413)

...

- Cyriacus (attested 451)

...

- Ticianus (474–476.)

...
[Venantianus]
...

- Projectus (attested 575 or 578)

...

- Donatus (attested 679)
- Hippolytus (attested 759)

...

- Erimpertus (attested 827)
- Jacobus (attested 852)

...

- Gerardus (attested 883, 887–888)
- Amaione (attested 892)
- Eldegarius (attested 903, 915)

...

- Zilicus (attested 924)?
- Olgerius (attested 935?)

...

- Ambrosius (attested 942)
- Aldegrausus (attested 951–970)
- Andreas (970–1002)
- Notker (11th century)

...

- Olderico (1027)
- Ambrogio Arluno (attested 1037–1051)
- Opizo (attested 1059– ? )

...
Fredentio (11th cent.)
...
Rainerius (attested 1092)
...

- Ardericus de Vignate (attested 1117–1127)

...

- Alberico di Merlino (1158–1168)
- Alberto Quadrelli (1168–1173)
- Albericus dal Corno (1173–1189)
- Ardericus di Sant'Agnese (1189–1217)

=== 1200 to 1500 ===
- Ardericus (d. 1217)
- Jacobus de Cereto, O. Cist. (1217)
- Ambrosius del Corno (1218)
- Ottobellus Soffientino (attested 1219, 1243)

Diocese suppressed (1241?–1252)

- Bonusjoannes Fissiraga (1252–1289)
- Raimundus Sommaripa, O.P. (1289–1296)
- Berardus Talente (1296–1307)
- Aegidius dall' Aqua (1307–1312)

Sede vacante (1312–1318)

- Leone Palatini, O.Min. (1318–1343)
- Lucas da Castello, O.Min. (1343–1353)
- Paolo Cadamosto (1354–1387)
- Pietro della Scala (1388–1392)
- Bonifazio Buttigella, O.E.S.A. (1393–1404)

Sede vacante (1404–1407)

- Giacomo Balardi Arrigoni, O.P. (26 Feb 1407 –1418)
- Gerardo Landriani (1419–1437)
- Antonio Bernieri (1435–1456)
- Carlo Pallavicino (1456–1497)
- Ottaviano Maria Sforza (1st time) (1497–1499 Resigned)

=== 1500 to 1800 ===
- Claude de Seyssel Administrator (1501 – 1512)
- Ottaviano Maria Sforza (2nd time) (1512–1519) Administrator
- Gerolamo Sansoni (19 Nov 1519 – 1536)
- Cardinal Giacomo Simonetta (4 Aug 1536 – 20 Jun 1537)
- Giovanni Simonetta (1537–1557)
- Gianantonio Capizucchi (5 Jul 1557 – 28 Jan 1569 )
- Antonio Scarampi (1569–1576)
- Gerolamo Federici (1576–1579)
- Ludovico Taverna (1579–1616)
- Michelangelo Seghizzi, O.P. (1616–1625)
- Clemente Gera (1625–1643)
- Pietro Vidoni (Sr.) (1644–1669 Resigned)
- Serafino Corio, C.R. (1669–1671)

Giovanni Battista Rabbia, C.R. (1671–1672)

- Bartolomeo Menatti (11 Sep 1673 – 15 Mar 1702)
- Ortensio Visconti (12 Jun 1702 – 13 Jun 1725)
- Carlo Ambrogio Mezzabarba (1725 –1741)
- Giuseppe Gallarati (18 Apr 1742 – 14 Apr 1765 Resigned)
- Salvatore Andriani, B. (22 Apr 1765 – 1 Apr 1784)
- Gianantonio Della Beretta (14 Feb 1785 – 16 Feb 1816)

Sede vacante (1816–1819)

=== since 1819 ===
- Alessandro Maria Pagani (1819–1835)
- Gaetano Benaglia (1837–1868)
- Domenico Maria Gelmini (24 Nov 1871 – 25 Jan 1888)
- Giovanni Battista Rota (1 Jun 1888 – 24 Feb 1913)
- Pietro Zanolini (8 Jul 1913 – 6 Dec 1923)
- Ludovico Antomelli, O.F.M. (24 Mar 1924 – 19 Jun 1927)
- Pietro Calchi Novati (8 Jul 1927 – 11 Jun 1952)
- Tarcisio Vincenzo Benedetti, O.C.D. (11 Nov 1952 – 24 May 1972)
- Giulio Oggioni (28 Sep 1972 –1977)
- Paolo Magnani (27 Jul 1977 –1988)
- Giacomo Capuzzi (7 Mar 1989 – 14 Nov 2005)
- Giuseppe Merisi (14 Nov 2005 – 26 Aug 2014 Retired)
- Maurizio Malvestiti (26 Aug 2014 – )

== Parishes ==
The diocese has reorganized its internal structure, and now has 123 parishes.

== Sources ==
- Ciseri, Alessandro (1732). Giardino istorico lodigiano, o sia Istoria sacro-profana della città di Lodi, e suo distretto (in Italian). Milano: Giuseppe Marelli.
- Cappelletti, Giuseppe (1857). Le chiese d'Italia: dalla loro origine sino ai nostri giorni : opera (in Italian). Vol. Tomo XII. Venice: G. Antonelli. pp. 277–393.
- Coleti, Niccolo; Zaccaria, Francesco Antonio (1763). Laudensium Episcoporum series a Ferdinando Ughelli primum contexta, deinde a N. Coletio ... aucta, nunc tandem a F. A. Zaccaria ... restituta et emendata pluribusque ... documentis locupletata. Accedit duplex dissertatio altera de Laudensis Urbis originibus, &c., altera de Laudensis Episcopatus initiis et vicissitudinibus (in Latin). Milan: Giuseppe Galeazzo.
- Donesmondi, Ippolito (1612). Dell'istoria ecclesiastica di Mantova. Del R. P. F. Ippolito Donesmondi minore osservante (in Italian). Vol. Parte prima. Mantova: presso Aurelio & Lodovico Osanna fratelli.
- Eubel, Conradus, ed. (1913). Hierarchia catholica (in Latin). Vol. Tomus 1 (second ed.). Münster: Libreria Regensbergiana.
- Eubel, Conradus, ed. (1914). Hierarchia catholica (in Latin). Vol. Tomus 2 (second ed.). Münster: Libreria Regensbergiana.
- Eubel, Conradus; Gulik, Guilelmus (1923). Hierarchia catholica (in Latin). Vol. Tomus 3 (second ed.). Münster: Libreria Regensbergiana.
- Gams, Pius Bonifatius (1873). Series episcoporum Ecclesiae catholicae: quotquot innotuerunt a beato Petro apostolo (in Latin). Ratisbon: Typis et Sumptibus Georgii Josephi Manz.
- Gauchat, Patritius (Patrice) (1935). Hierarchia catholica IV (1592-1667). Münster: Libraria Regensbergiana.
- Giornale Della Provincia Di Lodi E Crema: Per L'Anno 1858 (in Italian). Lodi: Dalla Provinciale e Vescovile Tipografia di Giovanni Pallavicini. 1858.
- Kehr, Paul Fridolin (1913). Italia pontificia Vol. VI. pars i. Berolini: Weidmann. pp. 238–260. (in Latin)
- Lanzoni, Francesco (1927). Le diocesi d'Italia dalle origini al principio del secolo VII (an. 604), vol. II, Faenza 1927, pp. 992–996. (in Italian)
- Ritzler, Remigius; Sefrin, Pirminus (1952). Hierarchia catholica medii et recentis aevi V (1667-1730). Patavii: Messagero di S. Antonio.
- Ritzler, Remigius; Sefrin, Pirminus (1958). Hierarchia catholica medii et recentis aevi VI (1730-1799). Patavii: Messagero di S. Antonio.
- Ritzler, Remigius; Sefrin, Pirminus (1968). Hierarchia Catholica medii et recentioris aevi sive summorum pontificum, S. R. E. cardinalium, ecclesiarum antistitum series... A pontificatu Pii PP. VII (1800) usque ad pontificatum Gregorii PP. XVI (1846) (in Latin). Vol. VII. Monasterii: Libr. Regensburgiana.
- Ritzler, Remigius; Sefrin, Pirminus (1978). Hierarchia catholica Medii et recentioris aevi... A Pontificatu PII PP. IX (1846) usque ad Pontificatum Leonis PP. XIII (1903) (in Latin). Vol. VIII. Il Messaggero di S. Antonio.
- Pięta, Zenon (2002). Hierarchia catholica medii et recentioris aevi... A pontificatu Pii PP. X (1903) usque ad pontificatum Benedictii PP. XV (1922) (in Latin). Vol. IX. Padua: Messagero di San Antonio. ISBN 978-88-250-1000-8.
- Schwartz, Gerhard (1907). Die Besetzung der Bistümer Reichsitaliens unter den sächsischen und salischen Kaisern: mit den Listen der Bischöfe, 951-1122. Leipzig: B.G. Teubner. (in German) pp. 119–122.
- Ughelli, Ferdinando; Niccolò Coleti (1719). Italia sacra, sive De episcopis Italiæ (in Latin). Vol. Tomus quartus. Venice: apud Sebastianum Coleti. pp. 654–688.
- Vignati, Cesare (1879). Codice diplomatico laudense (in Italian and Latin). Vol. parte prima. Milan: G. Brigola e compagno. ISBN 9788871213194.
