= Villa Scheilbler Gallarati Scotti, Rho =

The Villa Scheilbler Gallarati Scotti is a 16th-century hunting lodge and rural palace located in the town of Rho in the province of Milan, Region of Lombardy, Italy. This villa differs from the Villa Gallarati Scotti at Vimercate.

== History ==
Construction of the villa began in the 15th century, but it acquired its U-shaped layout in the following centuries. The previously open portico facing north is now enclosed by glass. The gardens date mainly from the 19th century. It is presently a private residence.

In 1464, the land was awarded to Giovanni Simonetti, an ally of the Visconti family. In 1760, the land and house were sold by the Simonetti to the Ferrario family, who in 1829 sold it to Giovanni Maria Formenti, and then in 1877, he sold it to Signora Elisa Vonwiller, widow of Scheibler. From there it passed on to Count Felice Scheibler, who was passionate about horseriding and hunting. He established the Milanese society for hunting on horseback (caccia a cavallo). He imported hounds from England to promulgate fox-hunts. In alliance with the Duke Viscount of Modrone and Baron Charles Leonino they founded a stable for the breeding of Thoroughbred horses.
