= Lodi Cathedral =

Cathedral in Lodi, Lombardy, Italy

Coordinates: 45°18′51.69″N 9°30′11.12″E

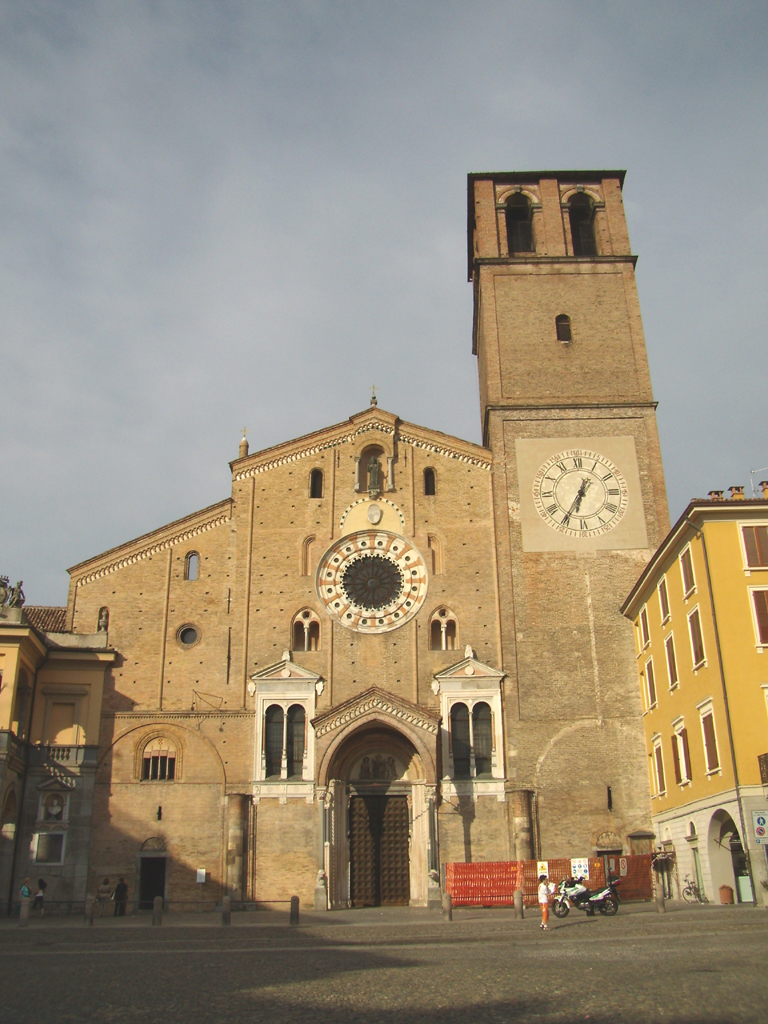
The west front facing onto Piazza della Vittoria ("Victory Square")

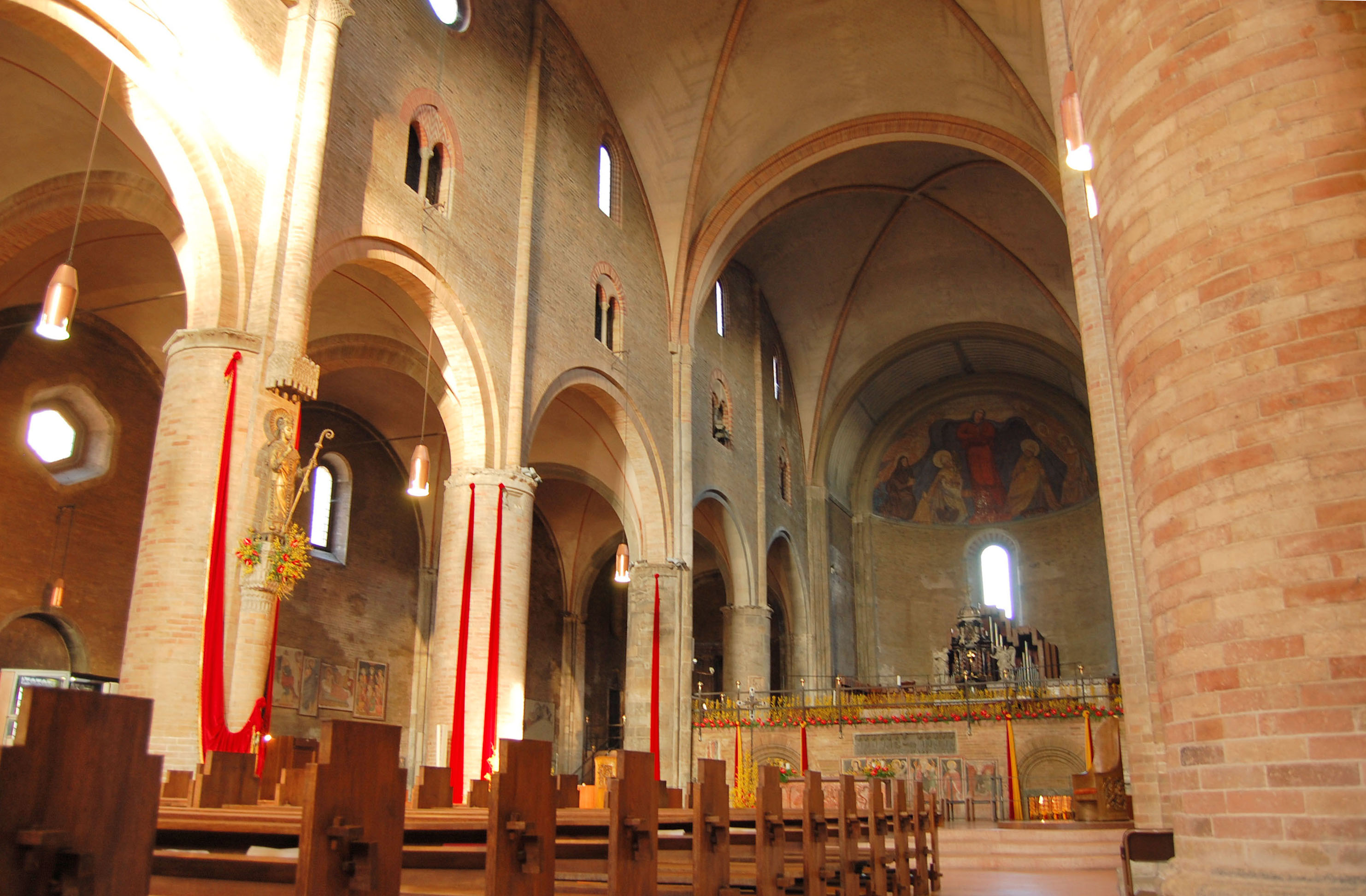
The nave

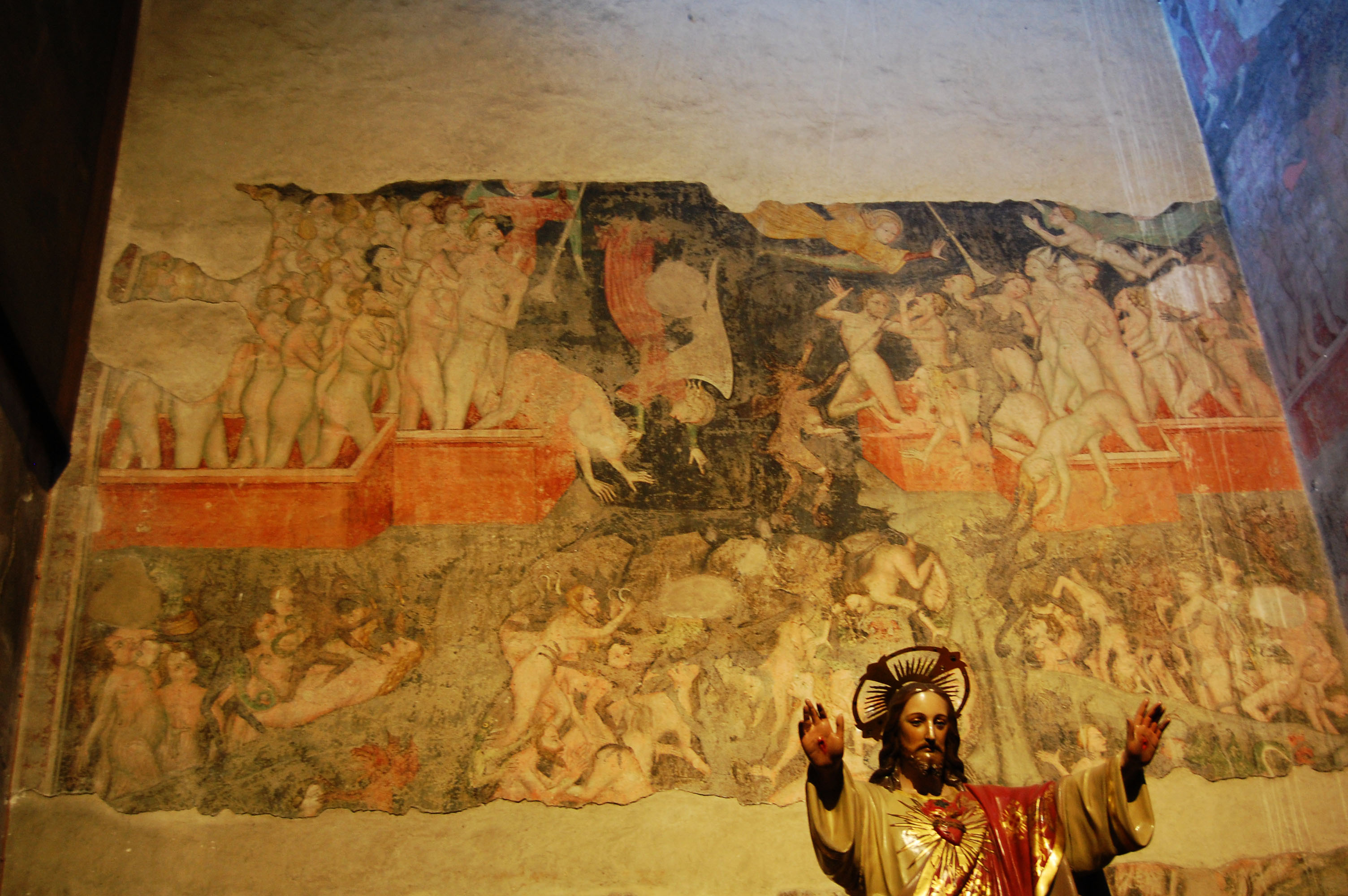
15th-century fresco of the Universal Judgement

Lodi Cathedral (Italian: Duomo di Lodi, Basilica Cattedrale della Vergine Assunta) is a Roman Catholic cathedral in Lodi, Lombardy, Italy. It is also a basilica minor. Dedicated to the Assumption of the Blessed Virgin Mary, it is the seat of the Bishop of Lodi. It is one of the largest churches in northern Italy.

== History ==
The cathedral was founded on 3 August 1158, the day on which Lodi was refounded after its destruction by the Milanese troops in 1111. The first phase of construction, for which it is probable that materials from the old Laus Pompeia (in what is now Lodi Vecchio) were reused, ended in 1163. The crypt was inaugurated with the translation of the relics of Saint Bassianus on 4 November 1163, in the presence of emperor Frederick I Barbarossa.

The second phase was carried on from 1170 to 1180, although the façade was completed only in 1284. Later, 18th century restorations altered the appearance of the building, which was however brought back to the original one in 1958–1965.

== Overview ==
=== Façade ===
The façade, in brickwork, is asymmetrical and is in a typical Romanesque style, with the exception of the large Gothic entrance portico supported by small columns with lion sculptures at the base. Other features include the large central rose window and two Renaissance double mullioned windows, similar to those designed by the school of Giovanni Antonio Amadeo for the Certosa di Pavia. There is also a niche housing the bronze statue of Saint Bassianus, a copy of the 1284 original in gilded copper, now inside the cathedral. The massive bell tower, built in 1538–1554 to a design by Callisto Piazza, remained unfinished for military reasons.

=== Interior ===
The interior has a nave and two aisles, all cross vaulted, separated by cylindrical pilasters in brickwork. Artworks include a polyptych by Callisto Piazza depicting the Massacre of the Innocents, another polyptych by Albertino Piazza with the Virgin in Heaven and a 15th century Universal Judgement. Finally, the large apse is decorated by a mosaic executed by Aligi Sassu.

Between the church and the adjoining Bishop's Palace (Palazzo Vescovile), is a court including what remains of the 1484 cloister, designed by Giovanni Battagio and featuring brickwork columns and decorations. The complex also houses the Diocesan Museum of Holy Art.

=== Crypt ===
The crypt, whose entrance features a 12th-century bas-relief, is the oldest section of the cathedral. Originally the pavement was 65 cm higher and the vaults were supported by brickwork pilasters. In its center is the altar (1856), which houses the remains of Saint Bassianus in a silver case, featuring the work of modern artists such as Giosuè Argenti and Tilio Nani. On the left of the high altar is the altar of Saint Alberto Quadrelli, bishop of Lodi from 1168 to 1173.

In the northern aisle is a 15th-century sculpture group portraying the Dead Christ.

== Sources ==
- Bottini, Vittorio; Alessandro Caretta; Luigi Samarati (1979). Lodi - Guida artistica illustrata. Lodi: Edizioni Lodigraf.
- Genesi M.-G., "Gli Organi Storici del Lodigiano", Piacenza, L.I.R. Ediz., 2017, pp. 720.
