= Museo Adriano Bernareggi =

Museum in Bergamo, Italy

Coordinates: 45°42′02″N 9°40′26″E

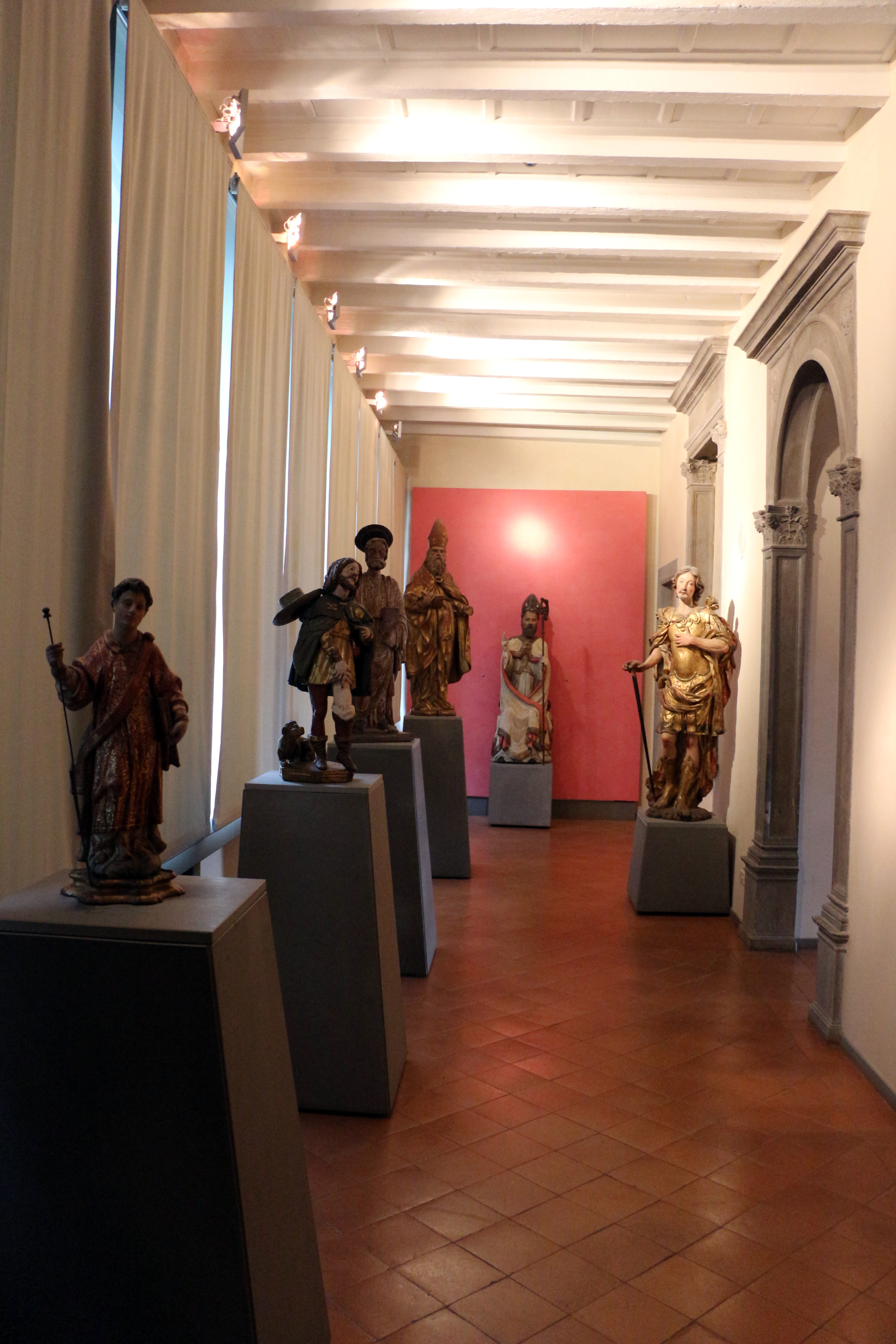
- Architect: Pietro Isabello
- Website: www.fondazionebernareggi.it

The Museo Adriano Bernareggi, also called the Museo Diocesano Bernareggi is a gallery of sacred art and objects housed in a former aristocratic palace, the Palazzo Bassi-Rathgeb, located on Via Pignolo #76 in Bergamo, Italy. The museum is presently managed by the Fondazione Adriano Bernareggi in conjunction with the Università degli Studi di Bergamo, and displays eclectic works of art from the 15th-century to present, often paired, and derived mainly from the Bernareggi family, as well as the Diocese of Bergamo.

== Description ==
The Palazzo Bassi-Rathgeb was built in 1520 for the brothers Zovannino and Bartolomeo Cassotti of Mazzolenis. The architect was Pietro Isabello. The 16th century sculptures in the courtyard were made by Donato Fantoni of Rosciano. The palace was rebuilt in 1680, and purchased in the early 18th century by the Count Giovanni Mosconi, who pursued further reconstructions between 1736 and 1741. Some of the interior palace frescoes were added by the brother Maironi da Ponte. After changing hands a few times, in 1891, Alberto Rathgeb became proprietor and 90 years later his heirs donated the property to the Diocese of Bergamo, in memory of Archbishop Adriano Bernareggi, to house the present museum, which previously had been housed in Casa Fogaccia in the upper city of Bergamo.

The collection includes the following:

- Il grande vento by Gianriccardo Piccoli (born 1941)
- Qoelet also by Piccoli
- Baptism of Christ by Giovanni Battista Moroni
- Companion contemporary piece by Piccoli inspired by Moroni work.
- Seven Works of Mercy, designs by Andrea Mastrovito
- Three Theologic Virtues engraving by Lucas van Leyden
- St Alexander (17th century wood icon) accompanies video display by Andrea Mastrovito titled A sud del cielo
- Polyptich of St Andrew by Pietro Bussolo (1460-after 1526)
- Glory of St Bernardino between Saints by Jacopino Scipioni
- Holy Trinity by Lorenzo Lotto, derived from the church of Sant'Alessandro della Croce
- Dead Christ between Angels by Alvise Vivarini
- Ecce Homo by GB Moroni.
- Via Crucis of Ferrariofrères derived from the church of the Hospital of Bergamo)
- Svegliami by Marco Grimaldi
- Photographs by Manolis Baoussis
