= Geltrude Comensoli =

19th-century Italian nun and saint (1847–1903)

Saint Geltrude Caterina Comensoli
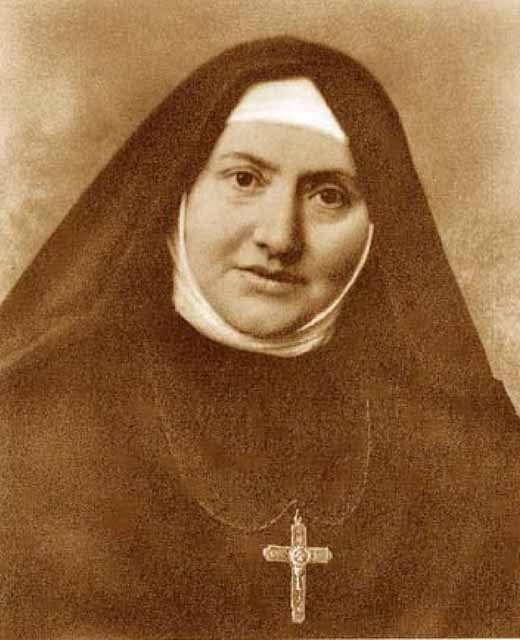

Foundress
- Born: January 18, 1847; Bienno, Brescia, Kingdom of Lombardy–Venetia (now Italy)
- Died: February 18, 1903; Bergamo, Italy
- Venerated in: Roman Catholic Church
- Beatified: October 1, 1989, Vatican City Saint Peter's Basilica by John Paul II
- Canonized: April 26, 2009, Vatican City Saint Peter's Basilica by Benedict XVI
- Feast: February 18
- Attributes: holding a Monstrance, Genuflecting or Kneeling to the Blessed Sacrament
- Patronage: Val Camonica, Youths,

Geltrude Caterina Comensoli (January 18, 1847 – February 18, 1903), also known as Mother Geltrude, is the Patroness of Youth, Val Camonica and Relic Custodians.

Her first attempt at religious life was curtailed by illness, and she took up work as a domestic. In 1882, with the encouragement of the Bishop of Bergamo, she founded the Institute of the Sacramentine Sisters.

== Biography ==
Geltrude Comensoli was born in Bienno, Italy on January 18, 1847, the fifth of ten children, to Carlo and Anna Maria Milesi Comensoli, seven of whom died in infancy. Her father was a forge worker in the local ironworks and her mother was a seamstress.

Comensoli left her family in 1862 and joined the convent of the Sisters of Charity, founded by St. Bartolomea Capitanio in Lovere, Bergamo. She became seriously ill and was released from the Institute.

After her recovery, she left her village due to the financial situation of her family and entered into domestic service, first with G. B. Rota, parish priest of Chiari, who a few years later was to become the Bishop of Lodi. Later she worked for the Countess Fé-Vitali.

On the Feast of Corpus Christi of 1878, with the permission of her confessor, she made a vow of chastity. Without neglecting her duties as a domestic servant, Caterina decided to educate the children of San Gervasio, Bergamo, guiding them towards an honest life of Christian and social virtues. Freed from family responsibilities after her parents’ death, the young woman sought a way to live a religious life.

Comensoli opened her heart to the Bishop of Bergamo, Pietro Luigi Speranza, who was, at that time, in Bienno as a guest of the Fé-Vitali's. He encouraged her. In 1880, while in Rome with the Fé-Vitali's, Comensoli succeeded in speaking with Pope Leo XIII about her plans to establish a religious institute devoted to the adoration of the Eucharist. The Pope suggested she include the education of young female factory workers as well.

Supported by the new Bishop of Bergamo, Gaetano Guindani, and by her "Father and Superior", Francesco Spinelli, on December 15, 1882, Comensoli, together with two of her friends, began the Congregation of the Sacramentine Sisters of Bergamo. She took the name of Sister Geltrude of the Blessed Sacrament. When innumerable difficulties had been overcome, Bishop Rota, with a decree of September 8, 1891, gave canonical recognition to the Institute. On 1st November 1894 she opened a house of nuns in Castelnuovo Bocca d'Adda and in the same years in Lavagna, in the province of Lodi.

Comensoli and her sisters, advised by the Bishop Guindani, abandoned their first location and took refuge in Lodi. The Bishop of Lodi, welcomed them and gave them a house in Lavagna di Comazzo, which temporarily became the Mother House of the Institute.

== Death ==
On February 18, 1903, at midday, Comensoli died. The news of her death quickly spread. Those who had known her, especially the poor and the humble, who were her favourite people, declared her a saint. On August 9, 1926, her remains were taken from the cemetery of Bergamo to the Mother House of the Institute which she had established. They resided in a chapel next to the Church of Adoration.

== Veneration ==
Comensoli's spiritual writings were approved by theologians on May 22, 1935. Her cause was formally opened on November 21, 1939, granting her the title of Servant of God. On April 26, 1961, the General Congregation of the then Congregation of Sacred Rites was held in the presence of Pope John XXIII, which declared her "Venerable". On October 1, 1989, Pope John Paul II declared Comensoli a beatified.

On April 26, 2009, Pope Benedict XVI declared Comensoli a saint.

There is a church dedicated to Saint Mother Gertrude Comensoli in Bienno, as well as a museum. She is the patroness saint of Margreid an der Weinstraße.

In May 1957, the first community settled in Villalta di San Raffaele. It is now the "Geltrude Comensoli Centre of Spirituality and Culture".
