= Pierina Morosini =

Italian Catholic martyr

Blessed Pierina Morosini
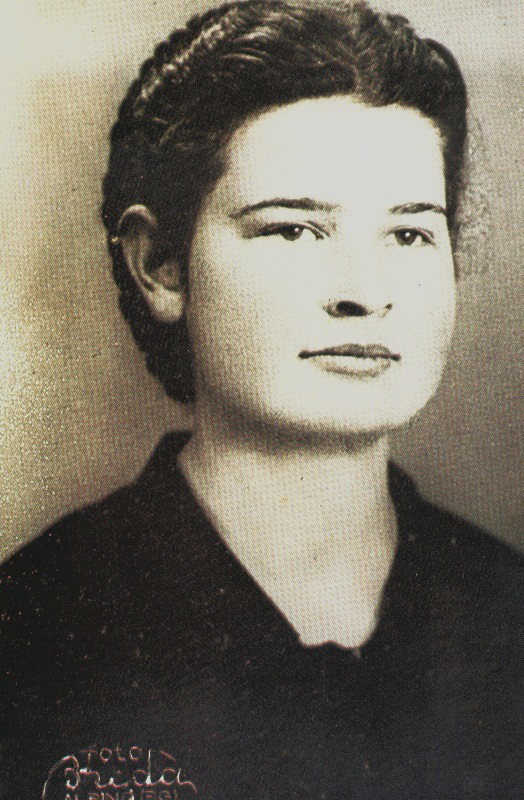

Virgin and martyr
- Born: 7 January 1931; Fiobbio, Albino, Bergamo, Kingdom of Italy
- Died: 6 April 1957 (aged 26); Fiobbio, Albino, Bergamo, Italy
- Venerated in: Catholic Church
- Beatified: 4 October 1987, Saint Peter's Basilica, Vatican City by Pope John Paul II
- Feast: 6 April, 6 May (in Bergamo)

Pierina Morosini (7 January 1931 – 6 April 1957) was an Italian Roman Catholic from Bergamo. She was killed after a man tried to rape her. Morosini served as a member of the Catholic Action movement.

Her beatification was held on 4 October 1987 in Saint Peter's Basilica.

== Life ==
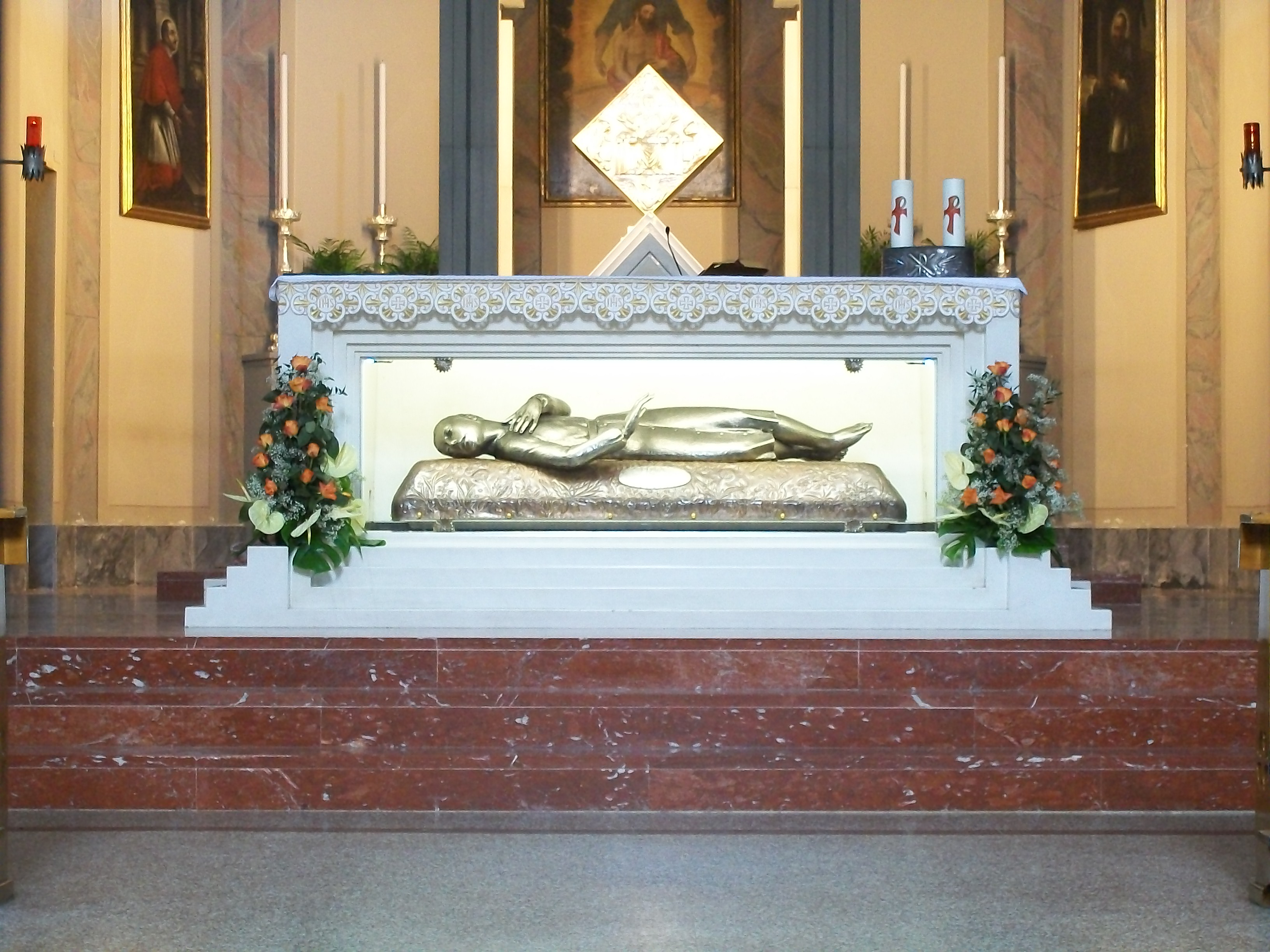
The High Altar of the parish church of Fiobbio, containing relics of the Blessed Pierina Morosini

Pierina Morosini was born in Fiobbio on 7 January 1931 as the first of nine children to the farmers Rocco Morosini and Sara Noris. Her baptism was celebrated on 8 January 1931 in the local parish church in the name of "Pierina Eugenia". She received her confirmation on 10 January 1937 from the Bishop of Bergamo Adriano Bernareggi and made her First Communion in May 1938.

Morosini lived her childhood near the mountains during World War II and soon became a member of Catholic Action in 1942 where she became an active member. She later became a seamstress on 18 March 1946 after the conflict and worked in a textile plant in Albino. The next month she was hospitalized for a brief period after an accident and there met the Capuchin priest Luciano Mologni who became her spiritual director. Morosini left her village once in her entire life in order to attend the beatification of Maria Goretti in Rome in 1947 and made the pilgrimage there with other Catholic Action members from 25 to 30 April. Each morning before work she received the Eucharist and recited rosaries back and forth from home to work.

Morosini began to wear the Brown scapular and joined the Third Order of Saint Francis while her 1950 attempt to convince her parents to allow her to join a religious order in Bergamo failed.

On 4 April 1957 she was walking home just before 3 pm and a man came up to her. He made lewd comments to her and tried to rape her despite her attempts to reason with him; she failed to escape but was stoned in the attempt. Morosini attempted to defend herself and she was beaten to death with stones in which her skull was smashed. Her brother found her in a pool of blood and called for help and she was rushed to hospital at once. Morosini died without regaining consciousness at the Bergamo hospital on 6 April 1957 from her injuries. Her remains were later relocated on 10 April 1983.

== Beatification ==
The diocesan process spanned from 7 April 1980 until 28 May 1983. Pope John Paul II confirmed that Morosini had died "in defensum castitatis" and therefore beatified Morosini on 4 October 1987 in Saint Peter's Basilica.
