= Adolfi =

Adolfi is an Italian surname. Notable people with the surname include:

- Ciro Adolfi (1683–1758), Italian painter
- Giacomo Adolfi (1682–1741), Italian painter
- John G. Adolfi (1888–1933), American film director, actor, and screenwriter
