= Bernareggi =

Bernareggi may refer to:

- Adriano Bernareggi, Italian Catholic archbishop
- Domenico Bernareggi, Italian churchman
- Museo Adriano Bernareggi, a museum in Bergamo, Italy

== See also ==
- Bernareggio
