= Francesco Spinelli =

Italian Roman Catholic priest (1853–1913)

Saint Francesco Spinelli
- Born: 14 April 1853; Milan, Kingdom of Lombardy–Venetia
- Died: 6 February 1913 (aged 59); Rivolta d'Adda, Cremona, Kingdom of Italy
- Venerated in: Roman Catholic Church
- Beatified: 21 June 1992, Santuario di Santa Maria del Fonte, Caravaggio, Italy by Pope John Paul II
- Canonized: 14 October 2018, Saint Peter's Square, Vatican City by Pope Francis
- Feast: 6 February

Francesco Spinelli (14 April 1853 – 6 February 1913) was an Italian Roman Catholic priest and the founder of the Sisters Adorers of the Blessed Sacrament. Spinelli became close contemporaries of Geltrude Comensoli and Luigi Maria Palazzolo and had a previous collaboration with Comensoli in which the two established a religious institute in Bergamo before a rift between members caused Spinelli to distance himself from its work and leave.

His beatification cause opened in 1952 under Pope Pius XII with the beatification being celebrated four decades later on 21 June 1992. Pope Francis confirmed Spinelli's canonization which took place on 14 October 2018.

== Life ==
Francesco Spinelli was born in Milan on 14 April 1853; he was baptized on the following 15 April. He - with his parents and siblings - moved from Milan to Cremona when he was still a child and would spend his summers at Vergo where in 1871 he was cured of a severe spinal problem. In his childhood he liked to hold puppet shows for fellow children while he visited the poor and ill with his mother on frequent occasions.

His call to the religious life was fostered due to the support of his mother and his priest uncle Pietro Cagliaroli. His friend Luigi Maria Palazzolo also encouraged him towards the path of the priesthood which he studied for in Bergamo. He was ordained to the priesthood in Bergamo on 14 August 1875 (which he received from the Bishop Pietro Luigi Speranza) and not long after travelled to Rome to take part in the Jubilee that Pope Pius IX convoked. He also went to the Basilica di Santa Maria Maggiore where he spent brief moments in reflection at the crib of the Infant Jesus. This provided him with the inspiration he needed to found a religious congregation of his own after a vision in which he saw women worshiping Jesus in Eucharistic Adoration. His return from Rome saw him hold educational activities at an evening school at a place his friend Palazzolo established and also assisted his priest uncle Pietro Cagliaroli with his parish activities.

On 15 December 1882 he co-founded the Sacramentine Sisters in Bergamo with Geltrude Comensoli that would devote itself to the Eucharist and to Eucharistic Adoration; the first convent opened on Via San Antonino. Spinelli was forced to leave it on 4 March 1889 after it failed due to a range of calamities including financial difficulties (the bishop decided to sever Spinelli's connection to the order as a result). He arrived in Rivolta d'Adda in Cremona penniless and pained due to what happened back in Bergamo. It was the diocesan bishop who offered him to come to Cremona to exercise his pastoral duties. In 1892 he founded the Sisters Adorers of the Blessed Sacrament that later received the diocesan approval of the Bishop of Cremona Geremia Bonomelli in 1897.

He died in 1913. The papal decree of praise for his order was issued on 11 December 1926 and later received full pontifical approval on 27 February 1932 from Pope Pius XI. The congregation he founded now operates in nations such as Argentina and Senegal and as of 2005 has up to 436 religious in a total of 59 houses.

On 30 August 1958 the Cardinal Patriarch of Venice Angelo Giuseppe Roncalli - the future Pope John XXIII - visited Spinelli's tomb and wrote in his journal: "Going from Lodi and arrived in Rivolta d'Adda where I admired the general house of the Sisters Adorers founded by Venerable Francesco Spinelli at whose tomb I was glad to pray". Roncalli referred to Spinelli as Venerable despite the fact that the formal recognition had not been conferred upon the late priest at that stage.

== Canonization ==
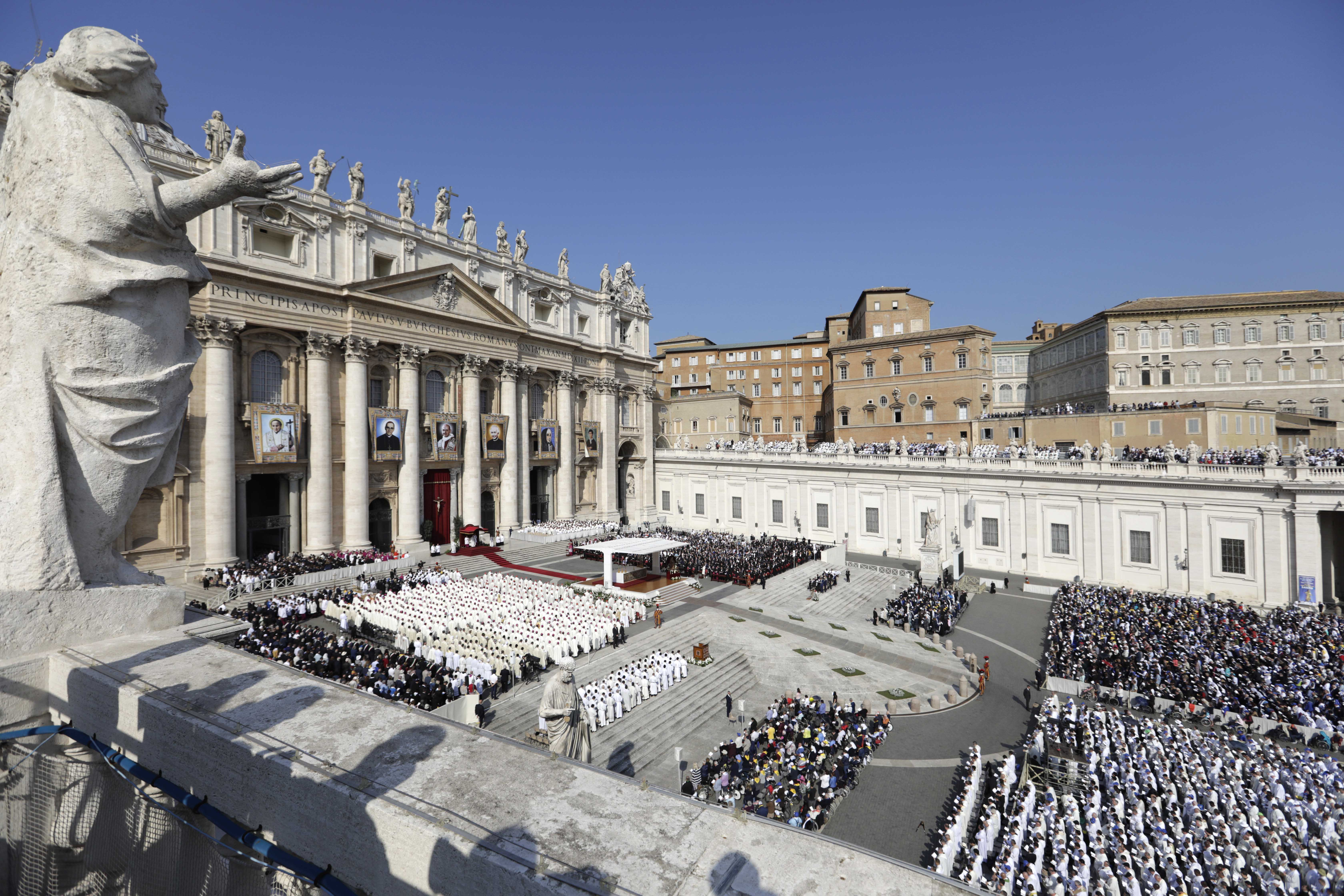
Spinelli's canonization Mass held in 2018 in Saint Peter's Square.

The beatification process commenced in the Cremona diocese in an informative process (1928-30 with a concurrent process from 1930 to 1931) that had been tasked in documenting his life and the manner in which his life adhered to the cardinal virtues and the theological virtues. Theologians approved his writings as in line with the Catholic faith on 22 November 1939. The cause was formally opened on 25 January 1952 under Pope Pius XII, granting Spinelli the title of Servant of God. An apostolic process was later held from 1953 until 1957 at which point the Congregation of Rites validated both processes on 22 June 1962.

The Positio was received in Rome in 1998 which enabled the Congregation for the Causes of Saints to start their own investigation into the cause and the contents of the dossier. Theologians approved the cause on 14 April 1989 as did the C.C.S. members on 9 January 1990. Pope John Paul II declared him to be Venerable on 3 March 1990 after recognizing his heroic virtue.

Spinelli's beatification depended upon a healing to receive papal confirmation which needed to be deemed miraculous in nature. One such case was investigated in the diocese it originated in before the contents of that investigation were sent to the Congregation for the Causes of Saints for additional assessment. Medical experts confirmed the healing to have no scientific explanation on 9 January 1992 with theologians confirming the healing was a result of Spinelli's intercession; the C.C.S. confirmed the findings of both boards on 7 April 1992. John Paul II later confirmed the investigated healing to be a miracle attributed to him on 2 June 1992. The pontiff beatified Spinelli on 21 June 1992 at a shrine in Caravaggio.

There needed to be one final confirmed miracle in order for him to be canonized as a saint. There came a case in the 2000s from Kinshasa in the Democratic Republic of Congo that was subjected to a diocesan investigation from 10 to 16 August 2014 and was sent to the Congregation for the Causes of Saints for further assessment. Medical experts confirmed this healing on 21 September 2017 as did theologians later on 30 November 2017. The C.C.S. later confirmed this miracle on 6 February 2018; Pope Francis later approved it on 6 March and Spinelli was canonized as a saint on 14 October 2018.

The current postulator assigned to the cause is Giovangiuseppe Califano.
