= Carlo Gritti Morlacchi =

- Bishop of Bergamo
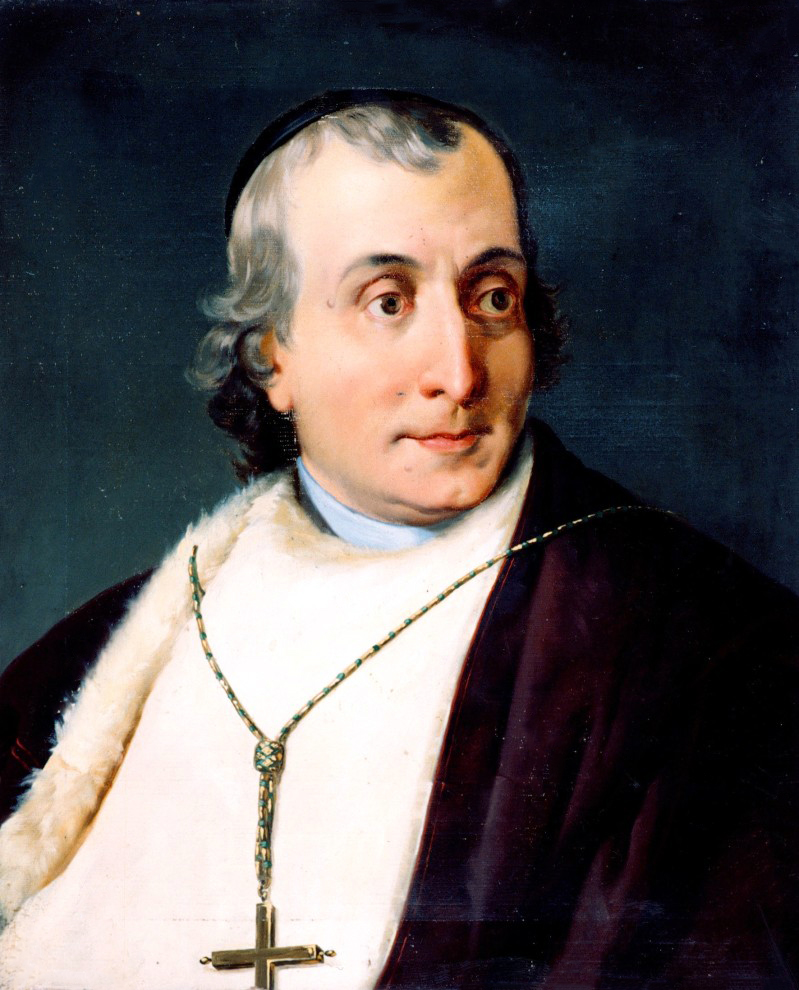
- Church: Catholic Church
- Diocese: Diocese of Bergamo
- In office: 28 February 1831 – 17 December 1852
- Predecessor: Pietro Mola
- Successor: Pietro Luigi Speranza

Orders
- Ordination: 30 May 1801
- Consecration: 6 March 1831 by Carlo Odescalchi

Personal details
- Born: 24 December 1777 Alzano Maggiore, Domini di Terraferma, Republic of Venice
- Died: 17 December 1852 (aged 74)

Styles of Carlo Gritti Morlacchi
- Reference style: The Most Reverend
- Spoken style: Your Excellency
- Religious style: Monsignor
- Posthumous style: none

Carlo Gritti Morlacchi (24 December 1777 – 17 December 1852) was the Bishop of Bergamo from 1831 to 1852.

== Life ==
Born in Alzano Lombardo, at the time a territory of Republic of Venice.

He studied in various seminaries in Lombardy and was ordained priest in 1801. Gritti Morlacchi was then named by Bishop Giampaolo Dolfin as headmaster of the Seminary of Bergamo. Later he was canon of the cathedral and was then named pastor of the Parish of Sant' Alessandro in Colonna in Bergamo.

After the death of Bishop Pietro Mola, Morlacchi was named Bishop of Bergamo by Pope Pius VIII.

=== Episcopacy ===
Consacreted bishop by Cardinal Carlo Odescalchi on 6 March 1831, he assumed the duty of a bishop. During his episcopacy, the entire territory of his diocese was part of the Kingdom of Lombardy–Venetia and he defended many times the autonomy of the Church against the Austrian authorities. Bishop Morlacchi appointed as teachers at the seminary many priests considered close to the ideas of Cornelius Otto Jansen.

During the turmoil of 1848 he supported the idea of a unified Italy under Carlo Alberto. the king of Sardinia.

He died in 1852.

== See also ==
- Morlacchi

== External links and additional sources ==
- Cheney, David M. "Diocese of Bergamo". Catholic-Hierarchy.org. (for Chronology of Bishops) ^{[self-published]}
- Chow, Gabriel. "Diocese of Bergamo". GCatholic.org. (for Chronology of Bishops) ^{[self-published]}

Catholic Church titles
| Preceded by Pietro Mola | Bishop of Bergamo; 1831 -1852 | Succeeded by Pietro Luigi Speranza |
