= Luigi Maria Palazzolo =

19th-century Italian Catholic priest

Saint Luigi Maria Palazzolo
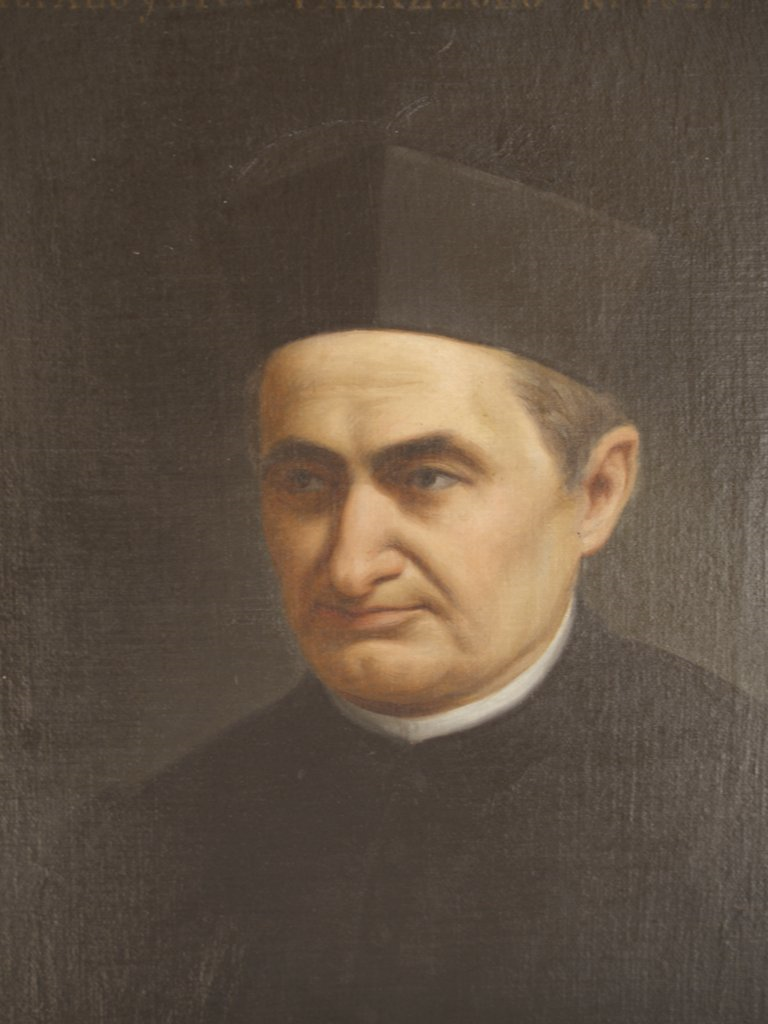

Priest
- Born: 10 December 1827; Bergamo, Kingdom of Lombardy–Venetia
- Died: 15 June 1886 (aged 58); Bergamo, Kingdom of Italy
- Venerated in: Roman Catholic Church
- Beatified: 19 March 1963, Saint Peter's Basilica, Vatican City by Pope John XXIII
- Canonized: 15 May 2022, Saint Peter's Square, Vatican City by Pope Francis
- Feast: 15 June; 22 May (Bergamo)
- Attributes: Priest's cassock
- Patronage: Sisters of the Poor; Orphans; Diocese of Bergamo

Luigi Maria Palazzolo (10 December 1827 – 15 June 1886) was an Italian Roman Catholic priest. He established the Sisters of the Poor which was also known as the Palazzolo Institute. Other contributions include the construction of an orphanage for children in Traona and also the Little House of Divine Providence. He also worked for the poor and the outcast until his death.

Palazzolo was beatified on 19 March 1963 on the account of his well-known holiness and is considered a patron of the Diocese of Bergamo. Pope Francis approved a miracle attributed to him on 28 November 2019 and canonized Palazzolo as a saint on 15 May 2022.

== Life ==
Luigi Maria Palazzolo was born in Bergamo on 10 December 1827 as the last of eight brothers to Octavius Palazzolo and Theresa Antoine. He had a childhood of lavishness in the sense that his parents could provide for their children to a manageable degree and owned land and houses across Bergamo and in San Pellegrino Terme where his father hailed from. During this time Palazzolo's brothers died and his father died on 8 August 1837. Due to his naïve disposition as a child and his wit he was often dubbed "Palazzolino" during his life.

Palazzolo commenced his studies for the priesthood in 1844 and on 23 June 1850 he was ordained to the priesthood under the Bishop of Bergamo Gritti Morlacchi. He became involved in the apostolate of San Alessandro in Colonna and then in the church of San Bernardino of which in 1855 he became rector. Personal loss struck once more on 10 September 1862 with the death of his mother. On 4 October 1872 he established an orphanage in Traona: this institution became extinct in 1928.

In 1864 Palazzolo travelled along a lane in a popular suburb and encountered a half-naked child who was an orphan. Palazzolo wrapped his cloak around him and took him with him to clean and feed him. He kept the child to care for him to ensure he did not remain abandoned. He became a member of a Catholic group in 1868 and he offered rooms for meetings. In 1869 he came across a crippled and lame girl – he took her in also and enrolled her into the new women's religious institute that he had founded. He recorded in his journal that he attempted "to do something as much as I can" to ensure others could have an easier life. One of the people he encountered and befriended was Maria Teresa Gabrieli – the future Servant of God – who became a member of his order.

Palazzolo's health started to decline in 1885 with a wheeze for breath that prevented him from proper sleep and compelled him to sleep in a large chair. He later had large sores grow in the lower limbs and he was unable to celebrate Mass. His comfort came from Bishop Gaetano Camillo Guindani who visited him at 4:30pm on 12 May 1885 to bring him the approved rules of the institute. Yet on one particular night he slipped from his bed and remained on the ground for three hours as he was unable to get back up.

Palazzolo died in the first hours of 15 June 1886 while murmuring the name of Jesus Christ. His remains were transferred on 4 January 1904 from the cemetery of San Giorgio to the Mother House of the institute.

== Post-mortem ==
Bishop Giacomo Radini-Tedeschi – on 23 January 1908 – was pleased with the progress and the rise of the institute and he urged for the approval of the constitutions and the rule of the order. The General Mother – Generosa Bruttomesso – wrote them up and final approval was granted on 25 May 1912 under Pope Pius X.

== Sainthood ==
Palazzolo's writings were formally approved by the theologians investigating his cause on 12 June 1929. The formal introduction – which granted Palazzolo the posthumous title Servant of God – came under Pope John XXIII on 20 November 1958. The pope approved the fact that he had lived a model Christian life of heroic virtue on 7 July 1962 and proclaimed him to be Venerable.

John XXIII also approved two miracles attributed to the intercession of Palazzolo and beatified him on 19 March 1963. Pope Francis confirmed a miracle attributed to him on 28 November 2019. The canonization was postponed from 2020 due to the COVID-19 pandemic until it was announced on 9 November 2021 that Francis would canonize Palazzolo on 15 May 2022.
