= Holy Trinity (Lotto) =

1519-1520 painting by Lorenzo Lotto

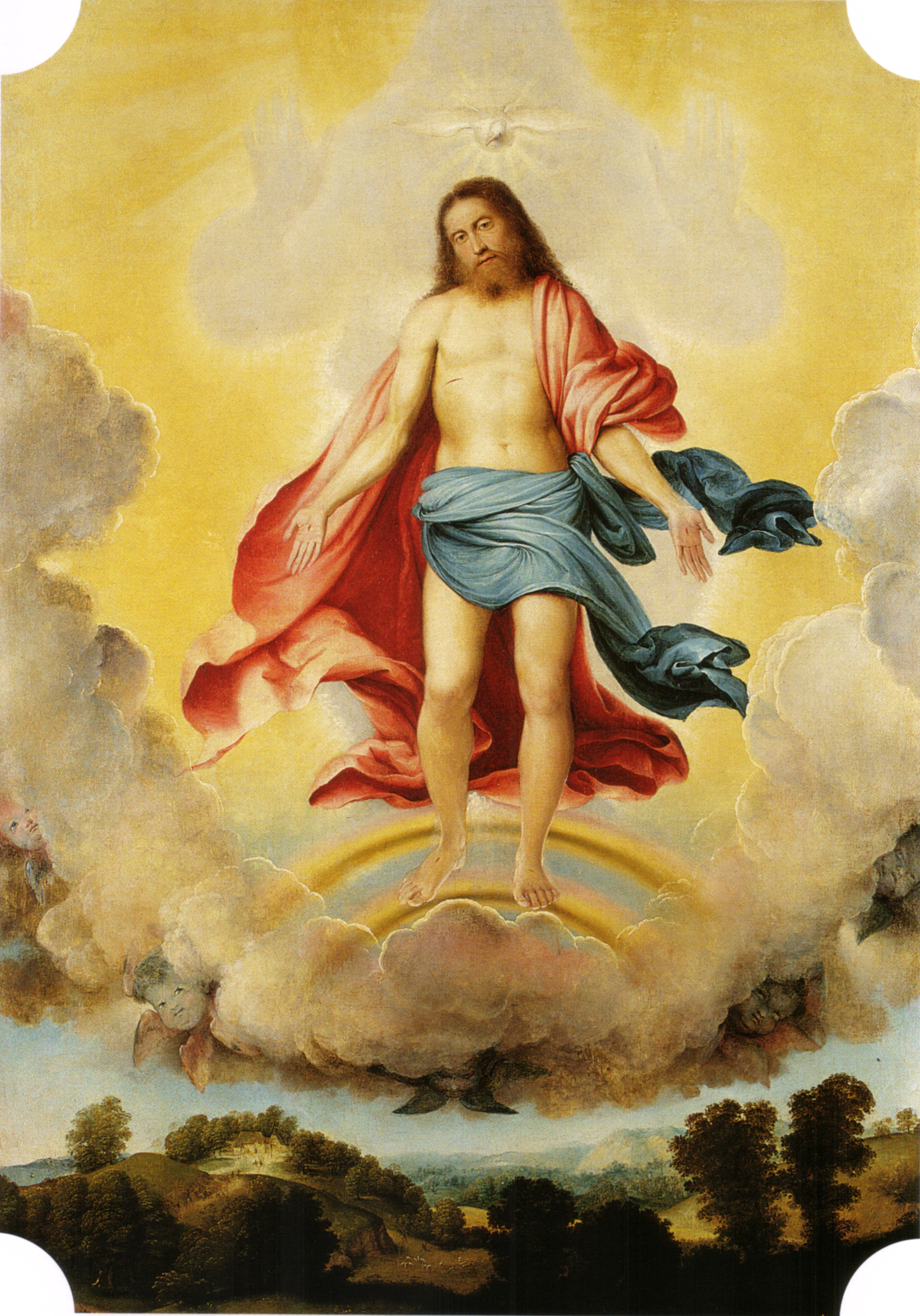
Holy Trinity (c. 1519–1520) by Lorenzo Lotto

Holy Trinity is an oil-on-canvas painting by Lorenzo Lotto, created c. 1519–1520. It was produced as an altarpiece for the high altar of Trinità Church in Bergamo, then sited in front of the Church of Santo Spirito.

There, it was placed near Lotto's Pietà with Saint Joseph and a Female Saint. The church was suppressed in 1808 and demolished, with the painting acquired by local curate Giovanni Battista Conti. It was later inherited by Giuseppe, a friar, who in 1818 gave it to the Church of Sant'Alessandro della Croce, its present owner. It is now temporarily stored at the Museo Adriano Bernareggi in Bergamo.
