= Fiobbio =

Village in Italy

Coordinates: 45°45′10″N 9°49′27″E

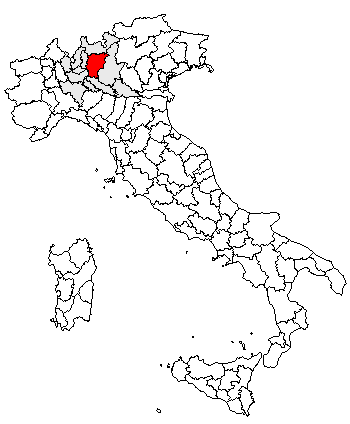
Location of the province of Bergamo

Fiobbio is a village in the province of Bergamo in Italy. It is a frazione of the comune of Albino.

== Geography ==
The village is in northern Italy, in the region of Lombardy.

== History ==
The organ in the Church of Santo Antonio di Padova in Fiobio dates to 1914.

== Famous residents ==
Fiobio is the birthplace of Blessed Pierina Morosini.
