= Pietro Lippomano =

Roman Catholic prelate (died 1548)

Most Reverend Pietro Lippomano
- Bishop of Verona
- Church: Catholic Church
- Diocese: Diocese of Verona
- In office: 1544–1548
- Predecessor: Giovanni Matteo Giberti
- Successor: Luigi Lippomano
- Previous post: Bishop of Bergamo (1516–1544)

Orders
- Consecration: 29 Jun 1530 by Gabriele Castelli

Personal details
- Died: 9 August 1548

Pietro Lippomano (died 1548) was a Roman Catholic prelate who served as Bishop of Verona (1544–1548) and Bishop of Bergamo (1516–1544).

== Biography ==
On 1 Jul 1516, Pietro Lippomano was appointed during the papacy of Pope Leo X as Bishop of Bergamo. On 29 Jun 1530, he was consecrated bishop by Gabriele Castelli, Titular Archbishop of Dariensis, with Mattia Ugoni, Bishop Emeritus of Famagusta, and Defendente Valvassori, Bishop of Capodistria, serving as co-consecrators. On 18 Feb 1544, he was appointed during the papacy of Pope Paul III as Bishop of Verona. He served as Bishop of Verona until his death on 9 Aug 1548.

== External links and additional sources ==
- Cheney, David M. "Diocese of Verona". Catholic-Hierarchy.org. (for Chronology of Bishops) ^{[self-published]}
- Chow, Gabriel. "Diocese of Verona". GCatholic.org. (for Chronology of Bishops) ^{[self-published]}
- Cheney, David M. "Diocese of Bergamo". Catholic-Hierarchy.org. (for Chronology of Bishops) ^{[self-published]}
- Chow, Gabriel. "Diocese of Bergamo (Italy)". GCatholic.org. (for Chronology of Bishops) ^{[self-published]}

Catholic Church titles
| Preceded by Niccolò Lippomano | Bishop of Bergamo; 1516–1544 | Succeeded by Pietro Bembo |
| Preceded by Giovanni Matteo Giberti | Bishop of Verona; 1544–1548 | Succeeded by Luigi Lippomano |
