= Giacomo Adolfi =

Italian painter (1682–1741)

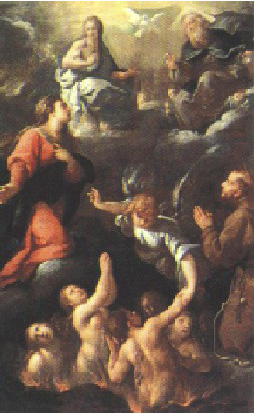
Pala del suffragio (Intercession altarpiece)

Giacomo Adolfi (1682–1741) was an Italian painter of the Baroque period, active in and around Bergamo.

== Biography ==
Giacomo Adolfi was born in Bergamo, the older brother of the painter Ciro Adolfi, and was initially taught by his father Benedetto Adolfi. He completed a number of fresco paintings in the churches and public buildings of Bergamo, including a Crowning of the Virgin for the church of Monastery del Paradiso and an Adoration of the Magi for Sant'Alessandro della Croce, Bergamo.
