= Pietro Mola =

- Bishop of Bergamo
- Church: Catholic Church
- Diocese: Diocese of Bergamo
- In office: 8 January 1821 – 16 January 1829
- Predecessor: Giampaolo Dolfin
- Successor: Carlo Gritti Morlacchi

Orders
- Ordination: 10 January 1779
- Consecration: 8 April 1821 by Carlo Gaetano Gaisruck

Personal details
- Born: 30 December 1755 Codogno, Duchy of Milan
- Died: 16 January 1829 (aged 73)

Styles of Pietro Mola
- Reference style: The Most Reverend
- Spoken style: Your Excellency
- Religious style: Monsignor
- Posthumous style: none

Pietro Mola (30 December 1755 – 16 January 1829) was the Bishop of Bergamo from 1821 to 1829.

== Life ==
Born in Codogno part of the Austrian ruled Duchy of Milan he was named by the authorities of the Cisalpine Republic pastor of the parish of Codogno. He was later named abbot of the abbey of Casalmaggiore and in 1821 he was named bishop of Bergamo.During his episcopacy he reaffirmed the teaching of pope Pius VII against the carbonari. Mola also blessed the new seminary of Bergamo at the top of Colle San Giovanni. He died in 1829.

Preceded by Giampaolo Dolfin	Bishop of Bergamo; 1821 -1829	Succeeded by Carlo Gritti Morlacchi

== External links and additional sources ==
- Cheney, David M. "Diocese of Bergamo". Catholic-Hierarchy.org. (for Chronology of Bishops) ^{[self-published]}
- Chow, Gabriel. "Diocese of Bergamo". GCatholic.org. (for Chronology of Bishops) ^{[self-published]}
