= Pietro Priuli =

18th-century Catholic cardinal

His Eminence Pietro Priuli
- Cardinal-Deacon of San Marco; Bishop of Bergamo
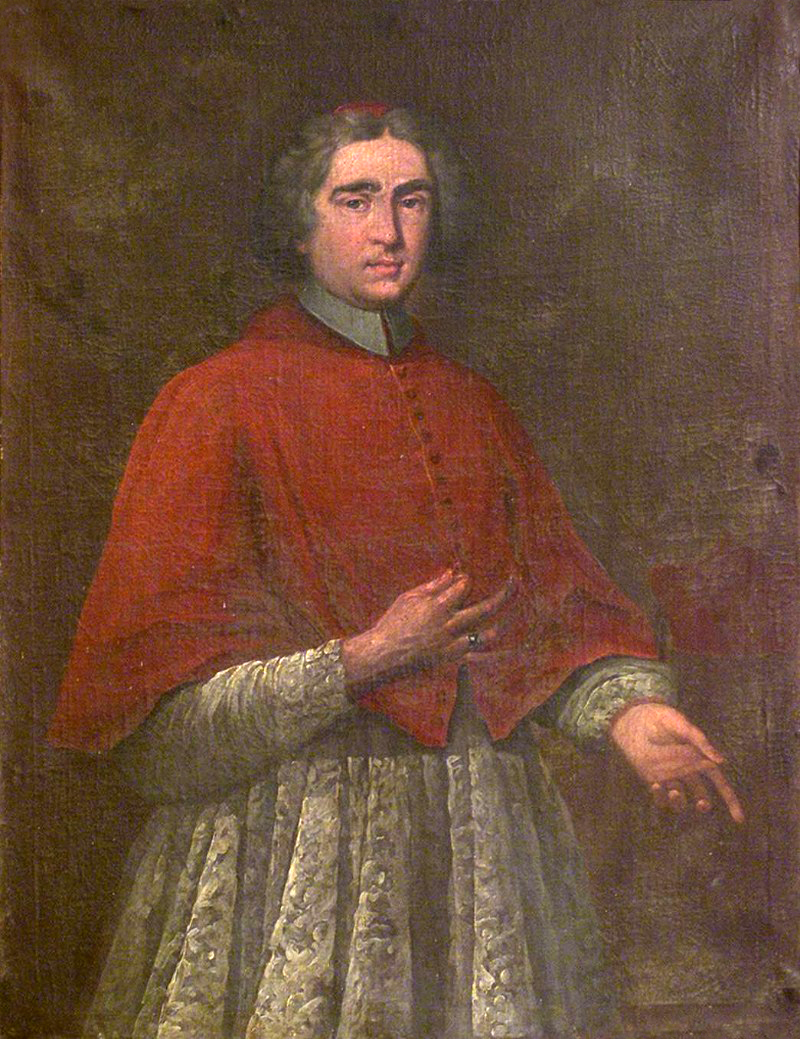
- Church: Catholic Church

Orders
- Consecration: 1 Jul 1708 by Pope Clement XI

Personal details
- Born: 14 Mar 1669 Venice, Italy
- Died: 22 Jan 1728 (age 58)

Pietro Priuli (1669–1728) was a Roman Catholic cardinal.

On 1 July 1708, he was consecrated bishop by Pope Clement XI, with Bandino Panciatici, Cardinal-Priest of San Pancrazio, and Ferdinando d'Adda, Cardinal-Priest of Santa Balbina, serving as co-consecrators.

== Episcopal succession ==
While bishop, he was the principal consecrator of:

- Doymus Zeni, Bishop of Arbe (1720);
- Valerio Rota, Bishop of Belluno (1720); and
- Antoine Kacich, Bishop of Trogir (1721).

Catholic Church titles
Preceded by Giovanni Francesco Albani	Cardinal-Deacon of Sant'Adriano al Foro; 1706–1720	Succeeded by Alessandro Albani
Preceded by Luigi Ruzini	Bishop of Bergamo; 1708–1728	Succeeded by Leandro di Porzia
Preceded by Luigi Priuli	Cardinal-Priest of San Marco; 1720–1728	Succeeded by Angelo Maria Quirini
