= Daniele Giustiniani =

Most Reverend Daniele Giustiniani
- Bishop of Bergamo
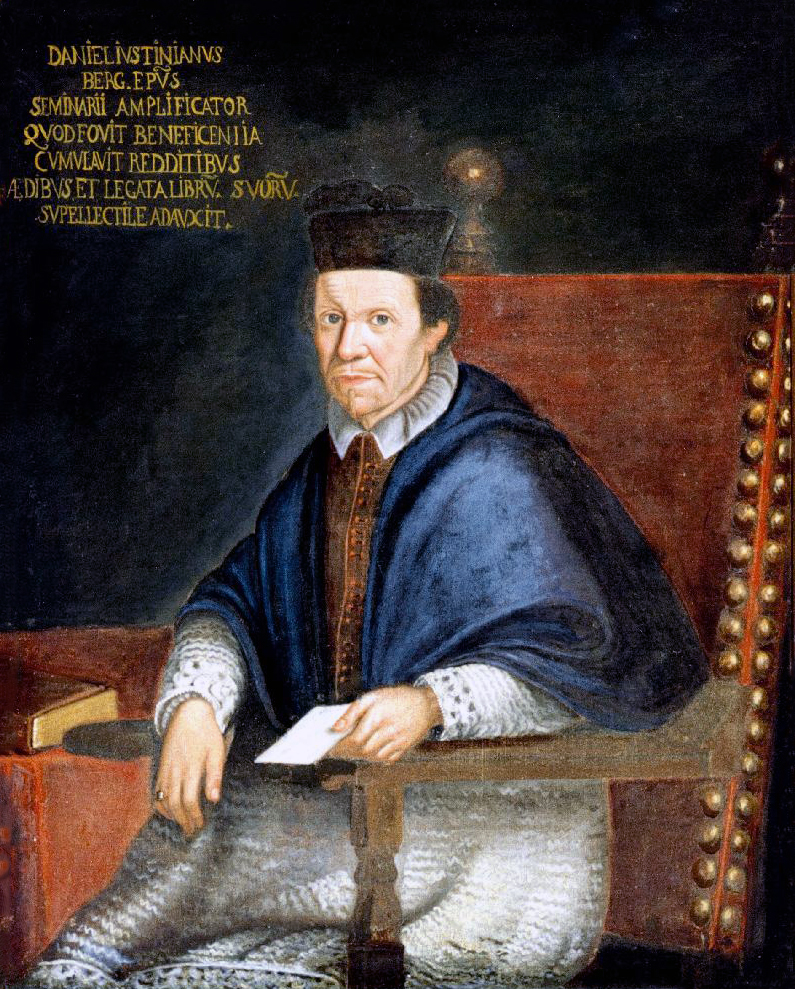
- Daniele Giustiniani
- Church: Catholic Church
- In office: 1664–1697
- Predecessor: Gregorio Giovanni Gasparo Barbarigo
- Successor: Luigi Ruzini

Orders
- Consecration: 6 Jul 1664 by Pietro Vito Ottoboni

Personal details
- Born: 6 June 1615
- Died: 11 January 1697 (aged 81) Bergamo, Italy

Daniele Giustiniani (6 June 1615 – 11 January 1697) was a Roman Catholic prelate who served as Bishop of Bergamo (1664–1697).

== Biography ==
Daniele Giustiniani was born on 6 June 1615. On 23 June 1664, he was appointed during the papacy of Pope Alexander VII as Bishop of Bergamo. On 6 July 1664, he was consecrated bishop by Pietro Vito Ottoboni, Bishop of Brescia. He served as Bishop of Bergamo until his death on 11 January 1697.

== External links and additional sources ==
- Cheney, David M. "Diocese of Bergamo". Catholic-Hierarchy.org. (for Chronology of Bishops) ^{[self-published]}
- Chow, Gabriel. "Diocese of Bergamo (Italy)". GCatholic.org. (for Chronology of Bishops) ^{[self-published]}

Catholic Church titles
Preceded by Gregorio Giovanni Gasparo Barbarigo	Bishop of Bergamo; 1664–1697	Succeeded by Luigi Ruzini
