= Niccolò Lippomano =

Most Reverend Niccolò Lippomano
- Bishop of Bergamo
- Church: Catholic Church
- Diocese: Diocese of Bergamo
- In office: 1512–1516
- Predecessor: Lorenzo Gabriel
- Successor: Pietro Lippomano

Niccolò Lippomano was a Roman Catholic prelate who served as Bishop of Bergamo (1512–1516).

== Biography ==
On 16 Jul 1512, Niccolò Lippomano was appointed during the papacy of Pope Julius II as Bishop of Bergamo. He served as Bishop of Bergamo until his resignation in 1516.

== External links and additional sources ==
- Cheney, David M. "Diocese of Bergamo". Catholic-Hierarchy.org. (for Chronology of Bishops) ^{[self-published]}
- Chow, Gabriel. "Diocese of Bergamo (Italy)". GCatholic.org. (for Chronology of Bishops) ^{[self-published]}

Catholic Church titles
Preceded by Lorenzo Gabriel	Bishop of Bergamo; 1512–1516	Succeeded by Pietro Lippomano
