= Clemente Gaddi =

- Bishop of Diocese of Bergamo
- Church: Roman Catholic Church
- See: Diocese of Bergamo
- In office: 1963 - 1977
- Predecessor: Giuseppe Piazzi
- Successor: Giulio Oggioni
- Previous posts: Diocese of Nicosia; Archdiocese of Siracusa

Orders
- Ordination: September 18, 1926
- Consecration: September 6, 1953 by Mgr Felice Bonomini

Personal details
- Born: 23 December 1901 Somana of Mandello del Lario, Italy
- Died: 7 November 1993 (aged 91) Bergamo

Styles of Clemente Gaddi
- Reference style: The Most Reverend
- Spoken style: Your Excellency
- Religious style: Monsignor
- Posthumous style: none

Clemente Gaddi (23 December 1901 – 7 November 1993) was an Italian prelate who was bishop of Bergamo in the years after the Second Vatican Council.

== Life ==
He was born in Mandello del Lario and ordained as a priest in 1926. From 1926 to 1953 he worked as professor of the seminary of Como and then prevost of Cernobbio.

In 1953, pope Pius XII named him bishop of Nicosia, and in 1962 pope John XXIII appointed him as Coadjutor archbishop of the Siracusa.

In 1963, after the death of bishop Giuseppe Piazzi he was named bishop of Bergamo with the personal title of Archbishop.

In 1977, he resigned from his post as bishop, and died in Bergamo where he is buried in the crypt of the Cathedral of Bergamo.

== External links and additional sources ==
- Cheney, David M. "Diocese of Bergamo". Catholic-Hierarchy.org. (for Chronology of Bishops) ^{[self-published]}
- Chow, Gabriel. "Diocese of Bergamo". GCatholic.org. (for Chronology of Bishops) ^{[self-published]}

Catholic Church titles
Preceded by Giuseppe Piazzi	Bishop of Bergamo; 1963 - 1977	Succeeded by Giulio Oggioni
