= Luigi Ruzini =

18th-century Catholic bishop

Most Reverend Luigi Ruzini
- Bishop of Bergamo
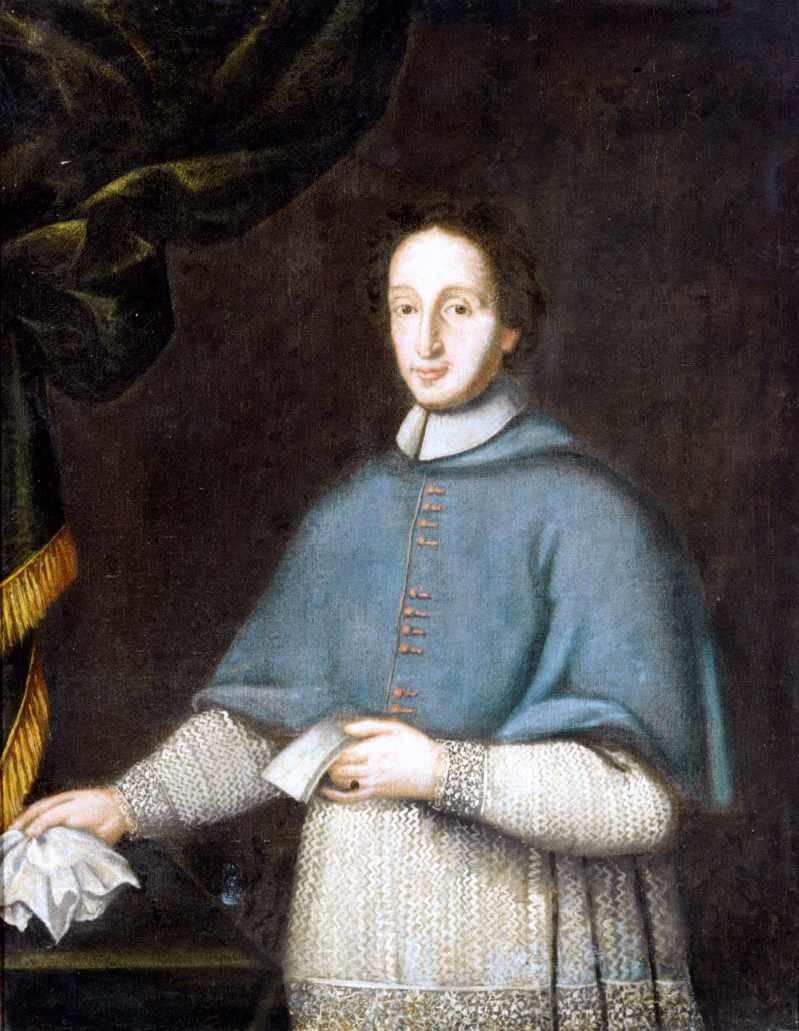
- Church: Catholic Church
- In office: 1698–1708
- Predecessor: Daniele Giustiniani
- Successor: Pietro Priuli

Orders
- Ordination: 9 Dec 1696
- Consecration: 2 Feb 1698 by Marcantonio Barbarigo

Personal details
- Born: 23 Apr 1658 Venice, Italy
- Died: 18 Mar 1708 (age 49) Bergamo

Luigi Ruzini (1658–1708) was a Roman Catholic prelate who served as Bishop of Bergamo (1698–1708).

== Biography ==
Luigi Ruzini was born in Venice, Italy on 23 Apr 1658. He was ordained a deacon on 2 Dec 1696 and as priest on 9 Dec 1696. On 27 Jan 1698, he was appointed during the papacy of Pope Innocent XII as Bishop of Bergamo. On 2 Feb 1698, he was consecrated bishop by Marcantonio Barbarigo, Bishop of Corneto e Montefiascone, with Francesco Pannocchieschi d'Elci, Archbishop of Pisa, and Marcello d'Aste, Titular Archbishop of Athenae, serving as co-consecrators. He served as Bishop of Bergamo until his death on 18 Mar 1708.

While bishop, he was the principal co-consecrator of Pietro Spínola, Bishop of Ajaccio (1698).

== External links and additional sources ==
- Cheney, David M. "Diocese of Bergamo". Catholic-Hierarchy.org. (for Chronology of Bishops) ^{[self-published]}
- Chow, Gabriel. "Diocese of Bergamo (Italy)". GCatholic.org. (for Chronology of Bishops) ^{[self-published]}

Catholic Church titles
Preceded by Daniele Giustiniani	Bishop of Bergamo; 1698–1708	Succeeded by Pietro Priuli
