= Lorenzo Gabriel =

Italian Catholic prelate (??–1512)

Most Reverend Lorenzo Gabriel
- Bishop of Bergamo
- Church: Catholic Church
- Diocese: Diocese of Bergamo
- In office: 1484–1512
- Predecessor: Ludovico Donato (bishop)
- Successor: Niccolò Lippomano

Personal details
- Died: 6 July 1512

Lorenzo Gabriel (died 1512) was a Roman Catholic prelate who served as Bishop of Bergamo (1484–1512).

== Biography ==
On 15 October 1484, Lorenzo Gabriel was appointed during the papacy of Pope Innocent VIII as Bishop of Bergamo. He served as Bishop of Bergamo until his death on 6 Jul 1512.

== External links and additional sources ==
- Cheney, David M. "Diocese of Bergamo". Catholic-Hierarchy.org. (for Chronology of Bishops) ^{[self-published]}
- Chow, Gabriel. "Diocese of Bergamo (Italy)". GCatholic.org. (for Chronology of Bishops) ^{[self-published]}

Catholic Church titles
Preceded by Ludovico Donato (bishop)	Bishop of Bergamo; 1484–1512	Succeeded by Niccolò Lippomano
