= Luigi Maria Marelli =

Italian prelate

The Most Reverend Luigi Maria Marelli
- Bishop of Bergamo
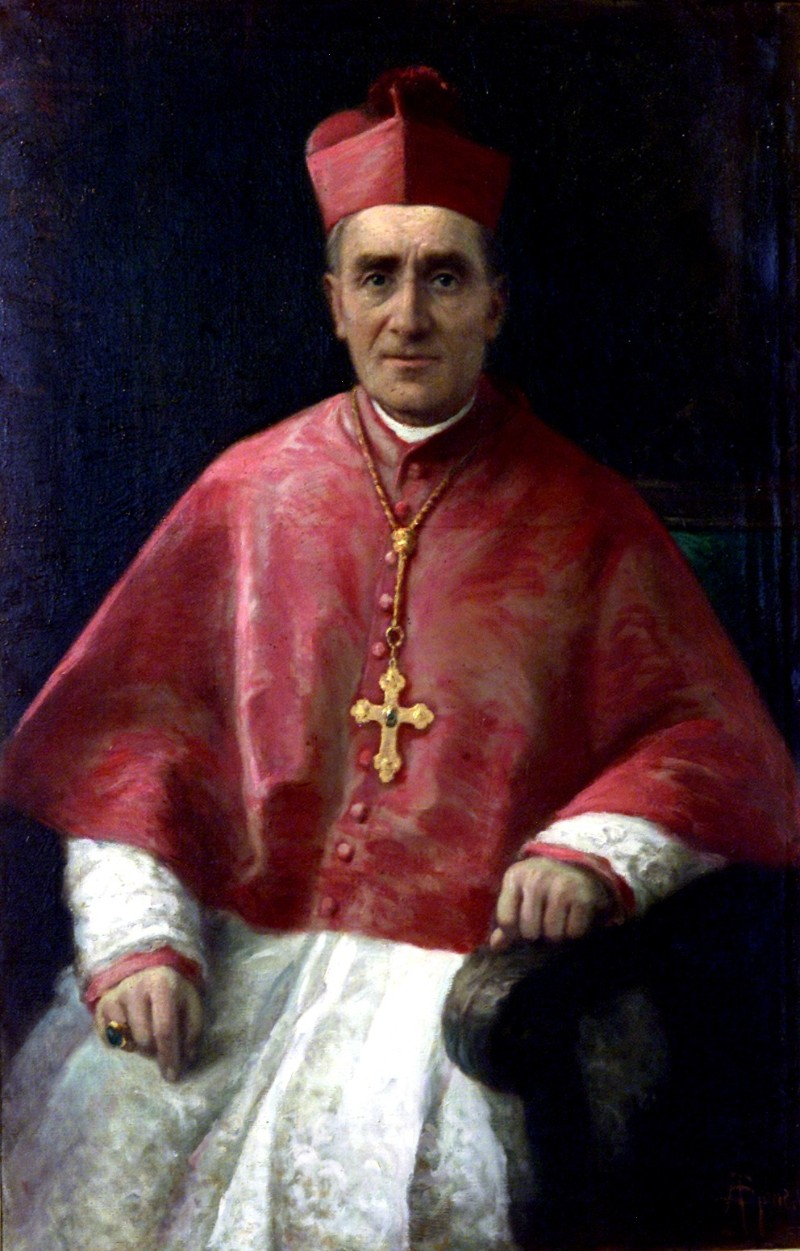
- Portrait of Bishop Marelli.
- Church: Roman Catholic Church
- Diocese: Bergamo
- Appointed: 15 December 1914
- Installed: 11 April 1915
- Term ended: 14 April 1936
- Predecessor: Giacomo Radini-Tedeschi
- Successor: Adriano Bernareggi
- Previous post: Bishop of Bobbio (1907–1914)

Orders
- Ordination: 11 June 1881 by Luigi Nazari di Calabiana
- Consecration: 6 January 1908 by Andrea Carlo Ferrari
- Rank: Bishop

Personal details
- Born: 24 April 1858 Milan, Lombardy, Italy
- Died: 14 April 1936 (aged 77) Rho, Lombardy, Italy
- Buried: Bergamo Cathedral, Crypt
- Denomination: Roman Catholic
- Motto: Latin: Innocua vigilo

Styles of Luigi Maria Marelli
- Reference style: The Most Reverend
- Spoken style: Your Excellency
- Religious style: Monsignor
- Posthumous style: none

Luigi Maria Marelli (1858-1936) was an Italian prelate named by pope Benedict XV bishop of Bergamo.

== Life ==
Born in Milan, Marelli was appointed bishop of Bobbio by pope Pius X in 1907 and in 1914 after the death of Giacomo Radini-Tedeschi he was transferred to the see of Bergamo. In 1920 pope Benedict XV sent to Marelli a letter, in the letter the pope affirmed the duty of the church to fight against Socialism but he also reaffirmed the importance of social teaching of Catholic Church Marelli died in 1936 in Rho, Lombardy.

== External links and additional sources ==
- Cheney, David M. "Diocese of Bergamo". Catholic-Hierarchy.org. (for Chronology of Bishops) ^{[self-published]}
- Chow, Gabriel. "Diocese of Bergamo". GCatholic.org. (for Chronology of Bishops) ^{[self-published]}

Preceded by Giacomo Radini-Tedeschi	Bishop of Bergamo; 1914 - 1936	Succeeded by Adriano Bernareggi
Preceded by Carlo Castelli	Bishop of Bobbio; 1907 - 1914	Succeeded by Pietro Calchi Novati
