= Luigi Grimani =

17th-century Roman Catholic bishop

Most Reverend Luigi Grimani
- Bishop of Bergamo
- Church: Catholic Church
- Diocese: Diocese of Bergamo
- Predecessor: Agostino Priuli
- Successor: Gregorio Giovanni Gasparo Barbarigo

Personal details
- Died: 4 December 1656

Luigi Grimani (died 1656) was a Roman Catholic prelate who served as Bishop of Bergamo (1633–1656).

== Biography ==
On 12 Jan 1633, Luigi Grimani was appointed during the papacy of Pope Urban VIII as Bishop of Bergamo. He served as Bishop of Bergamo until his death on 4 Dec 1656.

== External links and additional sources ==
- Cheney, David M. "Diocese of Bergamo". Catholic-Hierarchy.org. (for Chronology of Bishops) ^{[self-published]}
- Chow, Gabriel. "Diocese of Bergamo (Italy)". GCatholic.org. (for Chronology of Bishops) ^{[self-published]}

Catholic Church titles
Preceded by Agostino Priuli	Bishop of Bergamo; 1633–1656	Succeeded by Gregorio Giovanni Gasparo Barbarigo
