= Viator of Bergamo =

Saint Viator of Bergamo
- Died: 370; Bergamo
- Venerated in: Roman Catholic Church
- Feast: 15 January (14 Dec in Bergamo)

Saint Viator of Bergamo (Italian: Viatore di Bergamo) (died 370) is venerated as the second bishop of Bergamo. Viator is traditionally considered the successor of Saint Narnus in that see. Viator's episcopate is considered to have lasted from 343 to 370.

Viator attended the Council of Sardica (342–343), called to adjust the doctrinal and other difficulties of the Arian controversy. Viator assisted in the composition of decrees there; Saint Athanasius lists him as one of the authors of the decree Apologia contra Arianus.

== Veneration ==
Viator's legacy is long lived. His name appears on calendars dating from the eleventh, twelfth, and thirteenth centuries; his name appears in a litany dating from the twelfth century.

Viator was buried in the crypt of a church in Bergamo dedicated to Saint Alexander of Bergamo. When this church was demolished in 1561, Viator's relics, as well as those of Narnus, were translated to the church of San Vincenzo, today the cathedral of Bergamo, where they still rest today.
