= Antonio Redetti =

- Bishop of Bergamo
- Church: Catholic Church
- Diocese: Diocese of Bergamo
- In office: 22 November 1730 – 4 May 1773
- Predecessor: Leandro di Porcia
- Successor: Marco Molin

Orders
- Ordination: 28 August 1729
- Consecration: 30 November 1730 by Leandro di Porcia

Personal details
- Born: 4 November 1696 Rovigo, Domini di Terraferma, Republic of Venice
- Died: 4 May 1773 (aged 76)

Styles of Antonio Redetti
- Reference style: The Most Reverend
- Spoken style: Your Excellency
- Religious style: Monsignor
- Posthumous style: none

Antonio Redetti (1696-1773) was the bishop of Bergamo from 1731 to 1773.

Catholic Church titles
Preceded by Leandro di Porcia	Bishop of Bergamo; 1731 -1773	Succeeded by Marco Molin
