= Ciro Adolfi =

Italian painter (1683–1758)

Ciro Adolfi (1683–1758) was an Italian painter of the Baroque period, active in and around Bergamo.

He was born in Bergamo, the younger brother of the painter Giacomo Adolfi, and was initially taught by his father Benedetto Adolfi. He completed a number of fresco paintings in the churches and public buildings of Bergamo, including a Four Evangelists for the church of for Sant'Alessandro della Croce; a Deposition from the cross for Santa Maria della Grazie, and a Decollation of St. John for the parish church of Colognola.
