= Giuseppe Piazzi (bishop) =

- Bishop of Bergamo
- Church: Catholic Church
- Diocese: Diocese of Bergamo
- In office: 1 October 1953 – 5 August 1963
- Predecessor: Adriano Bernareggi
- Successor: Clemente Gaddi
- Previous post: Bishop of Crema (1950-1953)

Orders
- Ordination: 26 March 1932
- Consecration: 1 October 1950 by Francesco Ciceri

Personal details
- Born: 2 September 1907 Casalbuttano ed Uniti, Province of Cremona, Kingdom of Italy
- Died: 5 August 1963 (aged 55) Engelberg, Unterwalden, Switzerland

Styles of Giuseppe Piazzi
- Reference style: The Most Reverend
- Spoken style: Your Excellency
- Religious style: Monsignor
- Posthumous style: none

Giuseppe Piazzi (2 September 1907 – 5 August 1963) was an Italian bishop who led the Diocese of Crema and then the Diocese of Bergamo.

== Life ==
Born in Casalbuttano, he was ordained priest in 1932 for the Diocese of Cremona. From 1942 to 1950 he was the parish priest of Saint'Ilario in Cremona, where he was held in custody for a brief time by the authorities of the Italian Social Republic for his support for the partisans. In 1950 pope Pius XII named him Bishop of Cremona, and in 1953 he was appointed bishop of Bergamo. As Bishop of Bergamo, he decided to renovate the diocesan seminary, and he started the fraternal relationship between his diocese and the city of Cochabamba. He died in Engelberg.

== External links and additional sources ==
- Cheney, David M. "Diocese of Bergamo". Catholic-Hierarchy.org. (for Chronology of Bishops) ^{[self-published]}
- Chow, Gabriel. "Diocese of Bergamo". GCatholic.org. (for Chronology of Bishops) ^{[self-published]}

Preceded by Francesco Franco	Bishop of Crema; 1950–1953	Succeeded by Franco Costa
Preceded by Adriano Bernareggi	Bishop of Bergamo; 1953–1963	Succeeded by Clemente Gaddi
