= Guala da Telgate =

Italian bishop

Guala da Telgate (died 1186) was a bishop of the Roman Catholic diocese of Bergamo.

== Life ==
Guala participated in a capitular meeting in the Basilica di Sant'Alessandro, when the bishop Gerardo was forced by the people to recognize or not the Antipope Victor IV (1159–1164).

In 1166, Frederick Barbarossa descended upon the Po Valley with his army. He devastated the territories of Brescia, Bergamo and Milan, whose city was completely destroyed. Bishop Gerardo of Bergamo, who was supporting Frederick and his Antipope Paschal III (Guido of Crema), was summoned to Rome by Pope Alexander III, but when he refused to appear before the Papal Court, he was deposed. Pope Alexander then appointed a new Archbishop of Milan and Papal Legate for Lombardy, Cardinal Galdino della Sala, and instructed him to deal with the situation in Bergamo. Cardinal Galdino arrived in Bergamo in December 1167, summoned the clergy and people, and formally deposed Bishop Gerardo. Gerardo was driven out. He then ordered the Canons of S. Vincenzo and the Canons of S. Alessandro, led by the Archdeacon Adelardo, to form their usual committee to elect a replacement for Bishop Gerardo. One of the Canons of S. Alessandro, Guala, who was supported by Cardinal Galdino, was elected bishop.

Bishop Guala was present in Venice in 1177, as a representative of the Lombard League, when Pope Alexander and the Emperor Frederick concluded the Treaty of Venice.

Bishop Guala participated in and subscribed the decrees of the Third Lateran Council in March 1179.

Guala is known for his strong support of the Peace of Costanza, for which many Bergamaschi had fought and died.

Guala died in Bergamo on 30 October 1186.
