= Narnus =

Saint Narnus
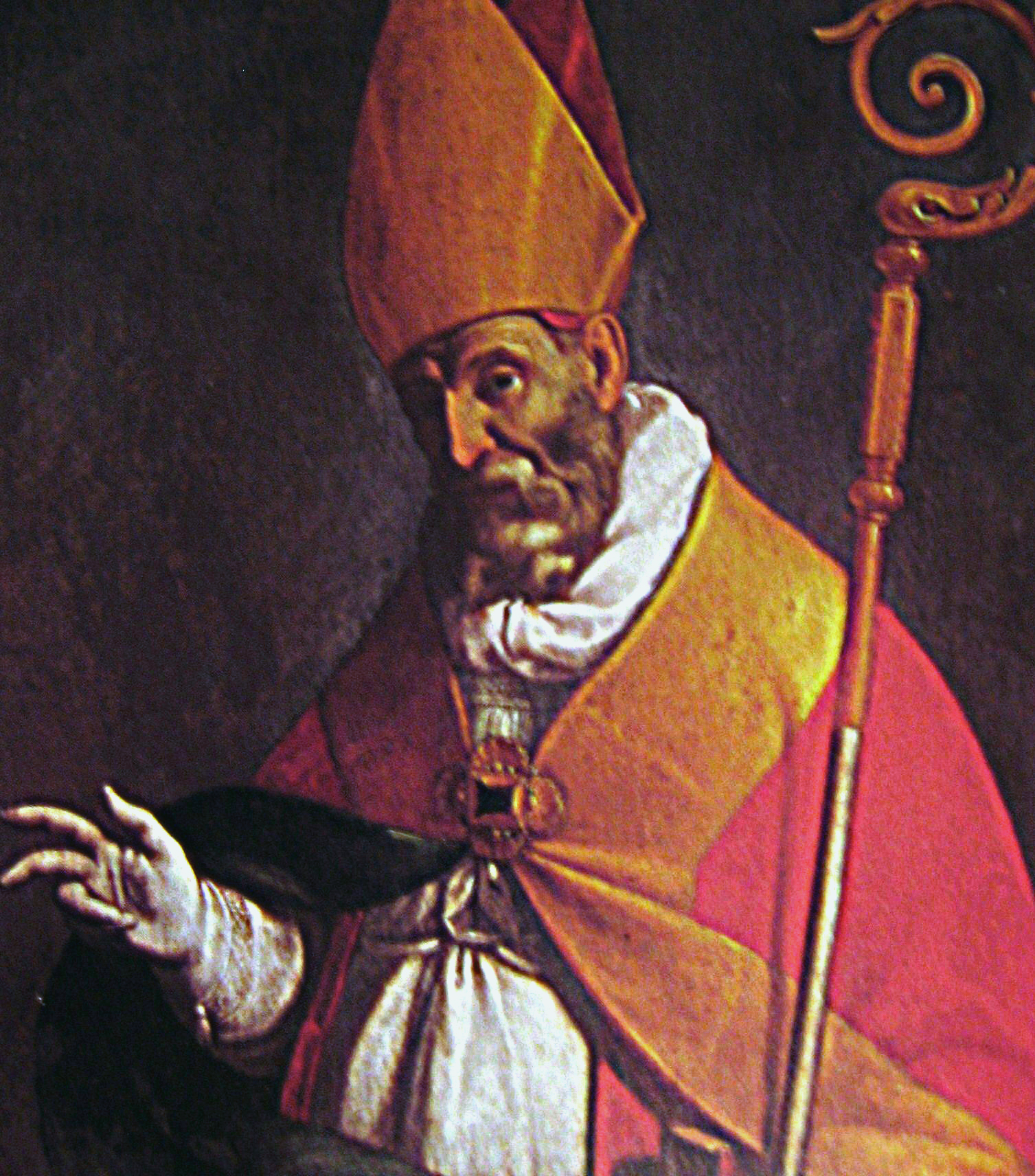
- Carlo Ceresa, Saint Narnus Bishop, Church of San Giovanni Apostolo, Villa d'Ogna, Bergamo.
- Born: Villa d'Ogna has been considered the place of Narnus’ birth.
- Died: 345; Bergamo
- Venerated in: Roman Catholic Church
- Major shrine: Cathedral of Bergamo
- Feast: August 27

Saint Narnus (Italian: San Narno) is venerated as the first bishop of Bergamo. Christian tradition holds that he was consecrated during the Apostolic Age in his office by St. Barnabas, although Narnus probably lived later than that. The oldest source that mentions Narnus dates from the 13th century; it was written by Branca da Gandino, a friar. He considers Narnus a bishop of Bergamo during the reign of Diocletian in the fourth century.

== Veneration ==
He was buried in the crypt of a church in Bergamo dedicated to Saint Alexander of Bergamo. When this church was demolished in 1561, Narnus’ relics, as well as those of his successor St. Viator, were translated to the church of San Vincenzo, today the cathedral of Bergamo, where they still rest today.
