= Agostino Priuli =

17th-century Roman Catholic bishop

Most Reverend Agostino Priuli
- Bishop of Bergamo
- Church: Catholic Church
- Diocese: Diocese of Bergamo
- In office: 1627–1632
- Predecessor: Federico Baldissera Bartolomeo Cornaro
- Successor: Luigi Grimani

Personal details
- Born: 5 Oct 1596 Venice, Italy
- Died: 4 Oct 1632 (age 35)

Agostino Priuli (1596–1632) was a Roman Catholic prelate who served as Bishop of Bergamo (1627–1632).

== Biography ==
Agostino Priuli was born in Venice, Italy on 5 Oct 1596. On 8 Feb 1627, he was appointed during the papacy of Pope Urban VIII as Bishop of Bergamo. He served as Bishop of Bergamo until his death on 4 Oct 1632.

== External links and additional sources ==
- Cheney, David M. "Diocese of Bergamo". Catholic-Hierarchy.org. (for Chronology of Bishops) ^{[self-published]}
- Chow, Gabriel. "Diocese of Bergamo (Italy)". GCatholic.org. (for Chronology of Bishops) ^{[self-published]}

Catholic Church titles
Preceded by Federico Baldissera Bartolomeo Cornaro	Bishop of Bergamo; 1627–1632	Succeeded by Luigi Grimani
