= Marco Molin =

Bishop of Bergamo

Marco Molin OSB
- Bishop of Bergamo
- Church: Catholic Church
- Diocese: Diocese of Bergamo
- In office: 13 September 1773 – 2 March 1777
- Predecessor: Antonio Redetti
- Successor: Giampaolo Dolfin

Orders
- Ordination: 19 September 1733
- Consecration: 19 September 1773 by Carlo Rezzonico

Personal details
- Born: 30 July 1709 Venice, Republic of Venice
- Died: 2 March 1777 (aged 67) Bergamo, Domini di Terraferma, Republic of Venice

Styles of Marco Molin
- Reference style: Sua Eccelenza
- Spoken style: Eccelenza
- Religious style: Monsignore

Marco Molin (30 July 1709 – 2 March 1777) was the Bishop of Bergamo from 1773 to 1777.

Molin was born in Venice on 30 July 1709. He was ordained a priest on 19 September 1733. He served at the Monastery of San Giorgio in Venice as Master of Novices, then as Prior, then as Abbot. He was Visitor for his Order's Province of Lombardy. At the time of his appointment as bishop, he was Abbot of the Monastery of San Giustino in Padua.

He was named Bishop of Bergamo on 13 September 1773 by Pope Clement XIV, and was consecrated in Rome on 19 September 1773 by Cardinal Carlo Rezzonico.

He died in Bergamo on 2 March 1777.

== Bibliography ==
- Ritzler, Remigius; Sefrin, Pirminus (1958). Hierarchia catholica medii et recentis aevi. Vol. Tomus VI (1730-1799). Patavii: Messagero di S. Antonio. (in Latin)

Preceded by Antonio Redetti	Bishop of Bergamo; 1773 -1777	Succeeded by Giampaolo Dolfin
