= Domenico Bernareggi =

Italian churchman

Domenico Bernareggi (5 September 1877 – 22 October 1962) was an Italian churchman.

He was born in Oreno, the brother of future archbishop Adriano Bernareggi. He was ordained as priest on April 14, 1900. He was named vicar capitular in 1945 by archbishop Ildefonso Schuster of the diocese of Milan.

He was appointed by Pius XII auxiliary bishop of the Roman Catholic Archdiocese of Milan and titular bishop of Famagusta.

He died in October 1962.

== Sources ==
- Website of Roman Catholic Archdiocese of Milan.
