= Giacomo Radini-Tedeschi =

Italian Catholic bishop

The Most Reverend Giacomo Radini-Tedeschi
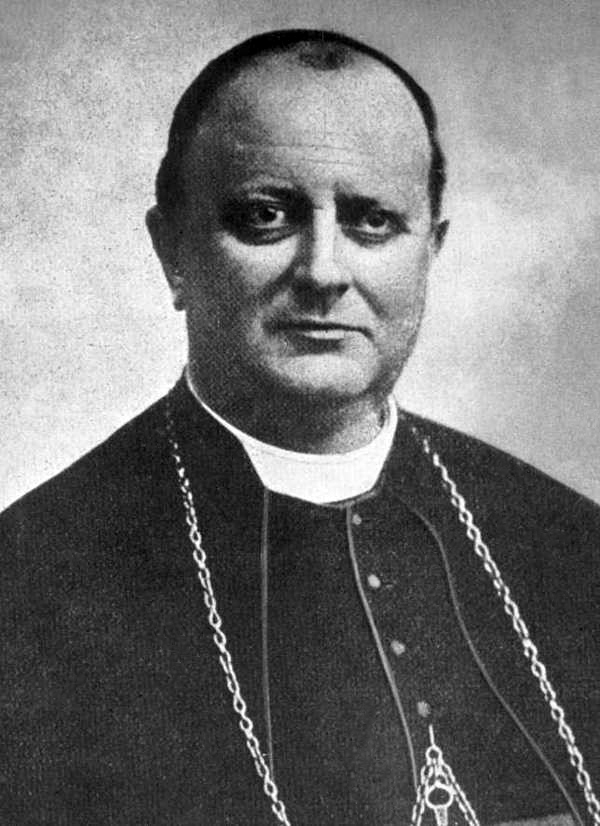
- Radini-Tedeschi pictured between 1905 and 1914.
- Church: Roman Catholic Church
- Diocese: Bergamo
- See: Bergamo
- Appointed: 20 January 1905
- Term ended: 22 August 1914
- Predecessor: Gaetano Guindani
- Successor: Luigi Maria Marelli

Orders
- Ordination: 2 November 1879 by Giovanni Battista Scalabrini
- Consecration: 29 January 1905 by Pope Pius X

Personal details
- Born: Giacomo Maria Radini-Tedeschi; 12 July 1857 Piacenza, Emilia-Romagna, Kingdom of Italy
- Died: 22 August 1914 (aged 57) Bergamo, Kingdom of Italy

Styles of Giacomo Radini-Tedeschi
- Reference style: The Most Reverend
- Spoken style: Your Excellency
- Religious style: Monsignor
- Posthumous style: None

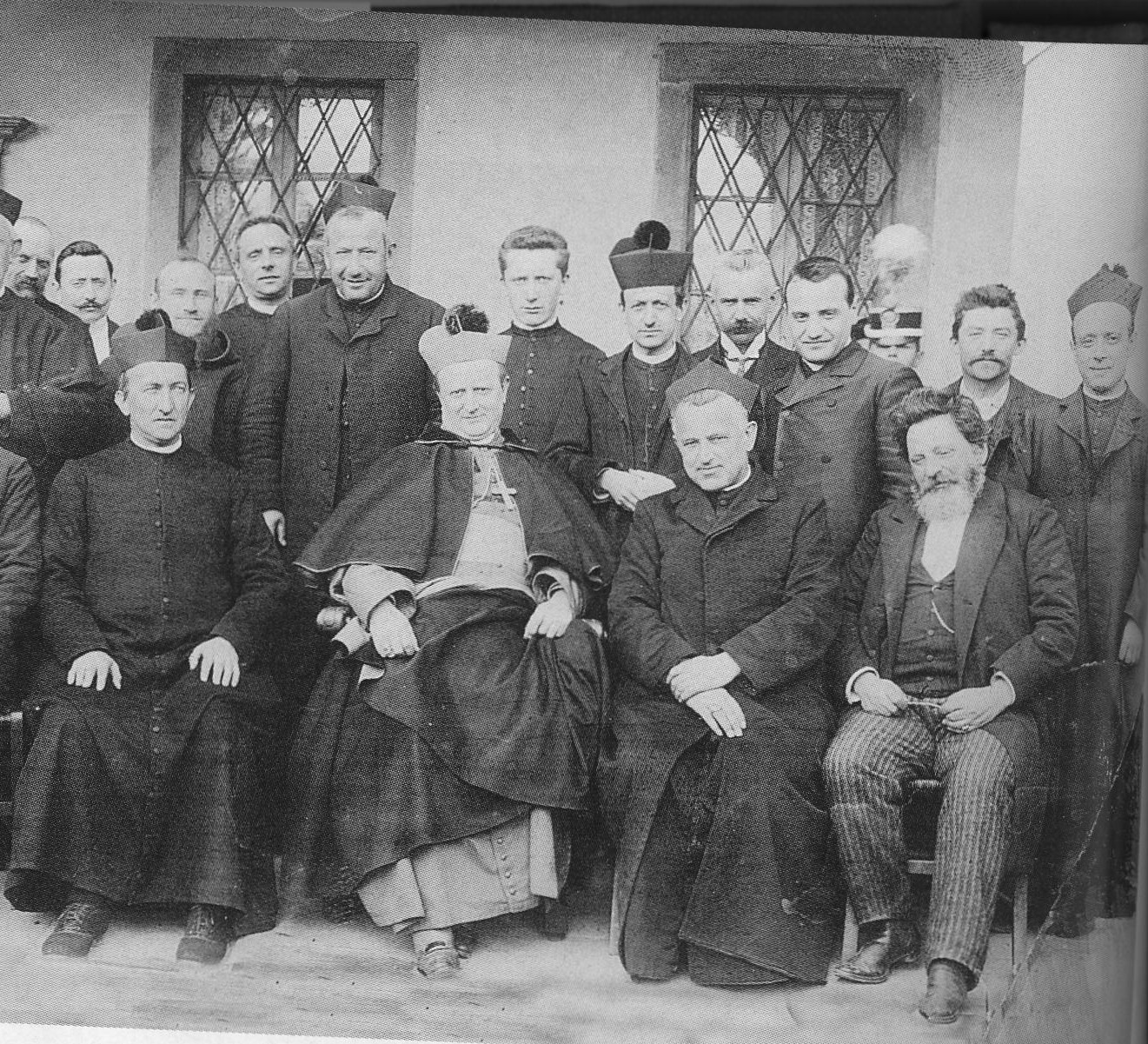
Left of Radini-Tedeschi (who is second from the left on the second row) is Angelo Giuseppe Roncalli, later to be Pope John XXIII.

Giacomo Maria Radini-Tedeschi (12 July 1857 – 22 August 1914) was the Bishop of the Roman Catholic Diocese of Bergamo. Today he is famous for his strong involvement in social issues at the beginning of 20th century.

== Biography ==
Radini-Tedeschi was born in Piacenza, the son of a wealthy and noble family. Ordained as a priest in 1879, he became professor of Church law in the diocesan seminary of Piacenza. In 1890 he joined the Secretariat of State of the Holy See and was involved in many diplomatic missions. On 5 January 1905 he was named Bishop of the Roman Catholic Diocese of Bergamo by Pope Pius X and consecrated by him in the Sistine Chapel. A strong supporter of Catholic trade unions, he strongly backed the workers of a textile plant in Ranica during a labor dispute.

Radini-Tedeschi fell ill with cancer and died in the early days of the World War I. During his episcopal ministry in Bergamo, Radini-Tedeschi had as his secretary a young priest named Angelo Giuseppe Roncalli, who later became Pope John XXIII. The bishop's last words were, "Angelo, pray for peace". For the late Pope John XXIII, Radini-Tedeschi was a teacher who was never forgotten by his one time follower.

== External links and additional sources ==
- Cheney, David M. "Diocese of Bergamo". Catholic-Hierarchy.org. (for Chronology of Bishops) ^{[self-published]}
- Chow, Gabriel. "Diocese of Bergamo". GCatholic.org. (for Chronology of Bishops) ^{[self-published]}
