= Giampaolo Dolfin =

Italian bishop

Giampaolo Dolfin CRL
- Bishop of Bergamo
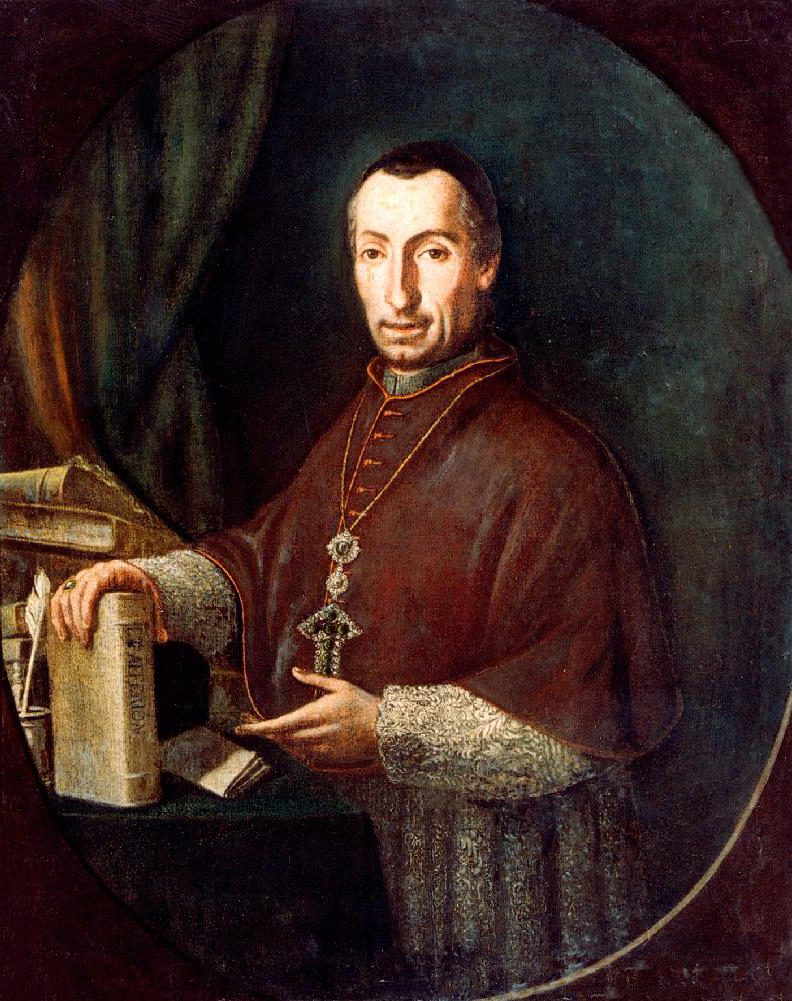
- Church: Catholic Church
- Diocese: Diocese of Bergamo
- In office: 28 July 1777 – 19 May 1819
- Predecessor: Marco Molin
- Successor: Pietro Mola
- Previous post: Bishop of Ceneda (1774-1777)

Orders
- Ordination: 3 December 1758
- Consecration: 3 July 1774 by Ludovico Calini

Personal details
- Born: 3 January 1736 Sebenico, Stato da Màr, Republic of Venice
- Died: 19 May 1819 (aged 83) Bergamo, Kingdom of Lombardy–Venetia, Austrian Empire

Styles of Giampaolo Dolfin
- Reference style: The Most Reverend
- Spoken style: Your Excellency
- Religious style: Monsignor
- Posthumous style: none

Giampaolo Dolfin (3 January 1736 – 19 May 1819) was a Roman Catholic prelate who became Bishop of Bergamo from 1777 to 1819.

== Life ==
Born in Sebenico (now Šibenik, Croatia), he joined the Canons Regular of the Lateran and in 1774 was appointed Bishop of Ceneda. Three years later, Pope Pius VI named him Bishop of Bergamo. In the first years of his tenure he tried to establish good relations with the Republic of Venice, the ruling power of the territory of his diocese. After the French Revolution and the occupation of Bergamo by the French Empire, Dolfin was one of the few bishops who did not try to prevent the seizure of church properties by the French. Dolfin died in 1819 when Bergamo was part of the Kingdom of Lombardy–Venetia.

== See also ==
- Catholic Church in Italy

== External links and additional sources ==
- Cheney, David M. "Diocese of Bergamo". Catholic-Hierarchy.org. (for Chronology of Bishops) ^{[self-published]}
- Chow, Gabriel. "Diocese of Bergamo". GCatholic.org. (for Chronology of Bishops) ^{[self-published]}

Catholic Church titles
Preceded by Marco Molin	Bishop of Bergamo; 1777 -1819	Succeeded by Pietro Mola
