= Pietro Luigi Speranza =

Bishop of Bergamo from 1854 to 1879

- Bishop of Bergamo
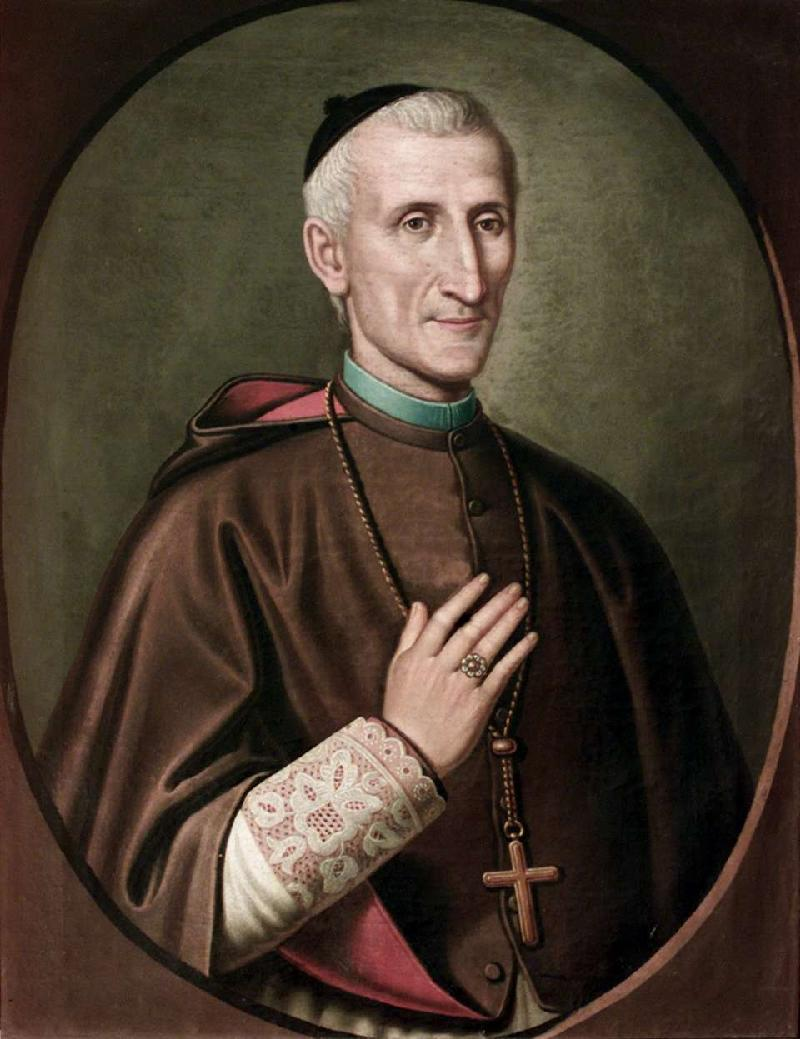
- Church: Catholic Church
- Diocese: Diocese of Bergamo
- In office: 19 December 1853 – 4 June 1879
- Predecessor: Carlo Gritti Morlacchi
- Successor: Gaetano Guindani

Orders
- Ordination: 18 September 1824
- Consecration: 8 January 1854 by Costantino Patrizi Naro

Personal details
- Born: 3 December 1801 Piario, Cisalpine Republic, French Republic
- Died: 4 June 1879 (aged 77)

Styles of Pietro Luigi Speranza
- Reference style: The Most Reverend
- Spoken style: Your Excellency
- Religious style: Monsignor
- Posthumous style: none

Pietro Luigi Speranza (3 December 1801 – 4 June 1879) was the Bishop of Bergamo from 1854 to his death 25 years later.

In 1868, he recognized the Congregation of the Holy Family of Bergamo.

== External links and additional sources ==
- Cheney, David M. "Diocese of Bergamo". Catholic-Hierarchy.org. (for Chronology of Bishops) ^{[self-published]}
- Chow, Gabriel. "Diocese of Bergamo". GCatholic.org. (for Chronology of Bishops) ^{[self-published]}

Catholic Church titles
Preceded by Carlo Gritti Morlacchi	Bishop of Bergamo; 1854 -1879	Succeeded by Gaetano Camillo Guindani
