= Gaetano Guindani =

Gaetano Camillo Guindani
- Bishop of Bergamo
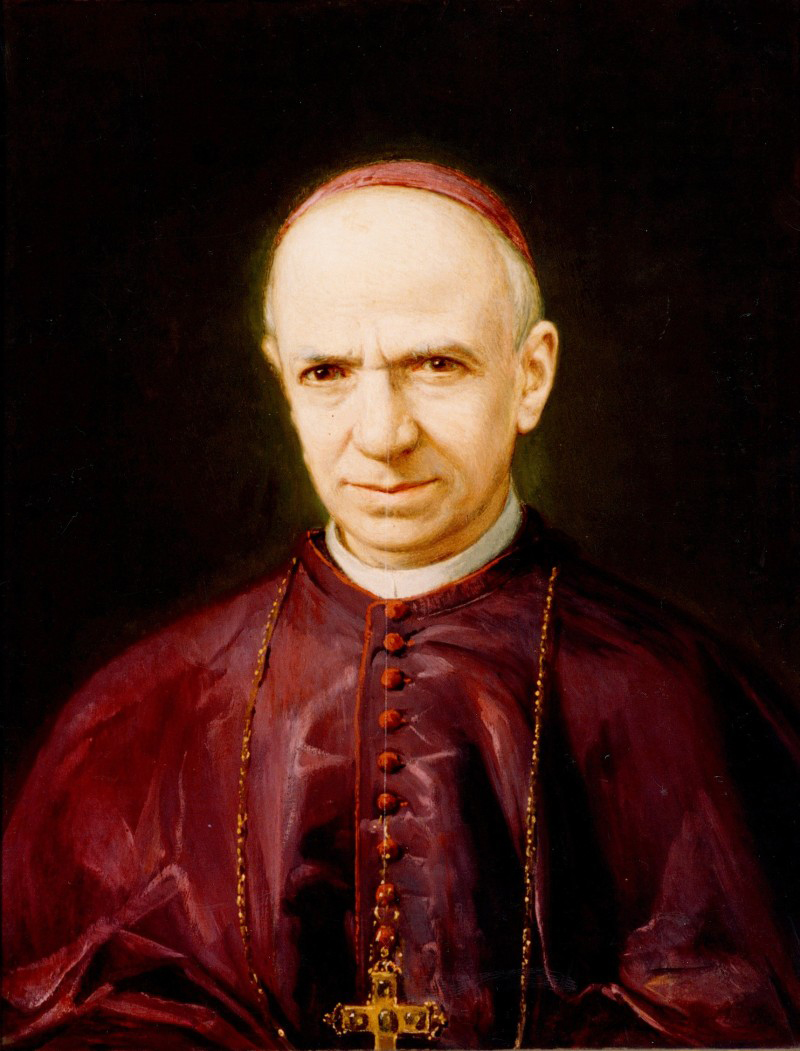
- Portrait of Camillo Guindani, c. 1904
- Church: Catholic Church
- Diocese: Diocese of Bergamo
- In office: 19 September 1879 – 21 October 1904
- Predecessor: Pietro Luigi Speranza
- Successor: Giacomo Radini-Tedeschi
- Previous post: Bishop of Borgo San Donnino (1872-1879)

Orders
- Ordination: 10 August 1857
- Consecration: 19 January 1873 by Geremia Bonomelli

Personal details
- Born: 20 September 1834 Cremona, Kingdom of Lombardy–Venetia, Austrian Empire
- Died: 21 October 1904 (aged 70) Bergamo, Province of Bergamo, Kingdom of Italy

Styles of Camillo Guindani
- Reference style: The Most Reverend
- Spoken style: Your Excellency
- Religious style: Monsignor
- Posthumous style: none

Gaetano Camillo Guindani also Gaetano Camillo Guindari (1834–1904) was an Italian prelate who was named bishop of Bergamo in the late years of the 19th century.

== Life and career ==
Born in Cremona at the time part of Kingdom of Lombardy–Venetia, after his degree in theology at Pontifical Gregorian University he was ordained priest for his native diocese. He taught dogmatic theology at Cremona's seminary then from 1865 to 1872 he was rector of the seminary. In 1872 pope Pius IX named him bishop of Borgo San Donnino now Fidenza, in 1879 he was transferred by pope Leo XIII to the diocese of Bergamo. He died in 1904 in Bergamo.

== Notes ==
In 1889 he confirmed the young Angelo Roncalli elected in 1958 pope John XXIII

== External links and additional sources ==
- Cheney, David M. "Diocese of Bergamo". Catholic-Hierarchy.org. (for Chronology of Bishops) ^{[self-published]}
- Chow, Gabriel. "Diocese of Bergamo". GCatholic.org. (for Chronology of Bishops) ^{[self-published]}

Preceded by Pietro Luigi Speranza	Bishop of Bergamo; 1879 -1904	Succeeded by Giacomo Maria Radini Tedeschi
