= Adriano Bernareggi =

Italian Catholic archbishop

- (Arch)Bishop of Bergamo
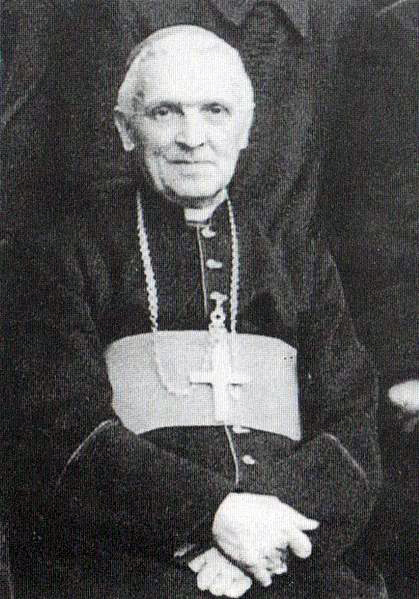
- Church: Catholic Church
- Diocese: Diocese of Bergamo
- In office: 14 April 1936 – 23 June 1953
- Predecessor: Luigi Maria Marelli
- Successor: Giuseppe Piazzi
- Previous posts: Coadjutor Bishop of Bergamo (1931-1936); Titular Bishop of Nyssa (1931-1936)

Orders
- Ordination: 21 July 1907 by Andrea Carlo Ferrari
- Consecration: 24 January 1932 by Alfredo Ildefonso Schuster

Personal details
- Born: 9 November 1884 Oreno, Vimercate, Province of Milan, Kingdom of Italy
- Died: 23 June 1953 (aged 68) Bergamo, Province of Bergamo, Italy

Styles of Adriano Bernareggi
- Reference style: The Most Reverend
- Spoken style: Your Excellency
- Religious style: Monsignor
- Posthumous style: none

Adriano Bernareggi (9 November 1884 – 23 June 1953) was an Italian Catholic archbishop.

== Biography ==
Born in Oreno, near Milan, was the brother of future bishop Domenico Bernareggi.

He was ordained a Roman Catholic priest in 1907. He graduated from Pontifical Gregorian University in canon law, after graduation became a teacher of canon law at the Milan Roman Catholic diocesan seminary. After a few years, Father Agostino Gemelli offered him a post as professor of ecclesiastic law at Catholic University in Milan.

Cardinal Achille Ratti named him pastor at San Vittore al Corpo in Milan. On 16 December Pope Pius XI appointed him coadiutor bishop with right of succession of the Roman Catholic diocese of Bergamo. In 1936 Bernareggi succeeded bishop Marelli as bishop of Bergamo. Bernareggi was promoted by Pope Pius XII as archbishop in 1952.

Bernareggi died on 23 June 1953. During his episcopacy in the territory of the diocese reported visions of Our Lady of Ghiaie di Bonate occurred.

== External links and additional sources ==
- Cheney, David M. "Diocese of Bergamo". Catholic-Hierarchy.org. (for Chronology of Bishops) ^{[self-published]}
- Chow, Gabriel. "Diocese of Bergamo". GCatholic.org. (for Chronology of Bishops) ^{[self-published]}

Catholic Church titles
Preceded by Luigi Maria Marelli	Bishop of Bergamo; 1936 - 1953	Succeeded by Giuseppe Piazzi
