= Diocese of Bergamo =

Roman Catholic diocese in Italy

Diocese of Bergamo Dioecesis Bergomensis

Catholic
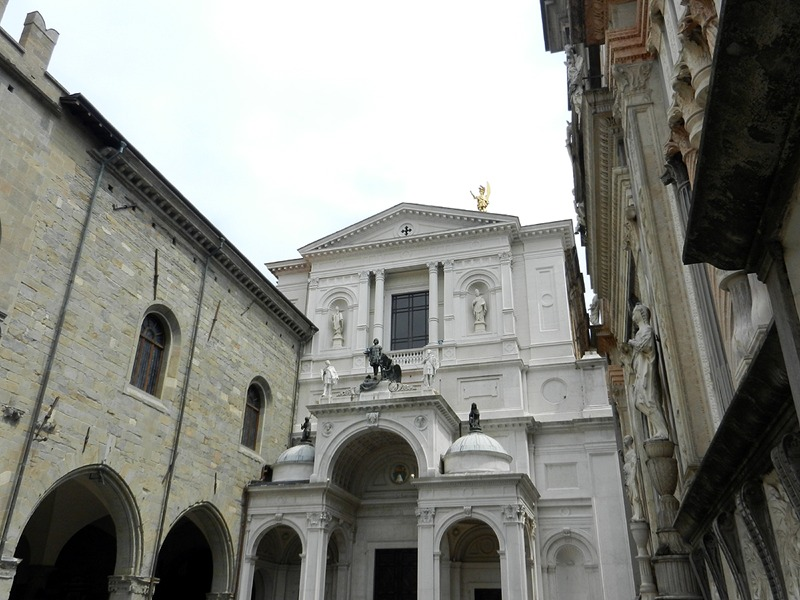
- Bergamo Cathedral

Location
- Country: Italy
- Ecclesiastical province: Milan

Statistics
- Area: 4,243 km^{2} (1,638 sq mi)
- Population: Total; Catholics: (as of 2020); 994,359; 938,600 (est.) (94%)
- Parishes: 389

Information
- Denomination: Roman Catholic
- Rite: Latin Rite
- Established: 4th Century
- Cathedral: Basilica Cattedrale di S. Alessandro Martire
- Patron saint: St. Alexander
- Secular priests: 667 (diocesan); 195 (Religious Orders); 11 Permanent Deacons

Current leadership
- Pope: Leo XIV
- Bishop: Francesco Beschi

Map

Website
- diocesibg.it

The Diocese of Bergamo (Latin: Dioecesis Bergomensis; Italian: Diocesi di Bergamo; Lombard: Diocesi de Bergum) is a Latin diocese of the Catholic Church in Italy, and is a suffragan of the Archdiocese of Milan. Geographically, Bergamo stood between the mainland interests of the Republic of Venice, and the territory of the Duchy of Milan. The duchy was regularly contested by the French and the Holy Roman Empire, which brought about repeated military operations. Internally, from the 12th to the 15th century, there was the usual party strife between the Guelphs, who generally supported the political and religious policies of the Papacy; and the Ghibellines, who generally supported the Emperors. As Kings of Italy, the emperors were feudal overlords of Lombardy.

The diocese was founded in the fourth century AD. Its first bishop was Narno, who was succeeded by Viator.

== History ==
August 26 is the feast day of Bergamo's patron, Saint Alexander, who is believed to have been a Roman centurion of the Theban legion imprisoned for his Christian beliefs. According to the fictional narrative, he escaped, was recaptured, and was executed as a martyr around 297 AD. There is a church, San Alessandro da Bergamo, currently administered by Benedictine priests.

On 25 March 901, the Emperor Louis III issued a charter in which he confirmed Bishop Adelbertus and his successors in all their rights and possessions as bishops of Bergamo. The diploma specially mentions the church of S. Alessandro in Fara, which Bishop John converted from the Arian heresy to the Catholic faith. On 23 June 904 King Berengar I of Italy ordered Bishop Adelbertus and the citizens of Bergamo to rebuild the walls which had been destroyed during the incursion of the Hungarians. In return for this service, the King confirmed and strengthened the Bishop's civil control over the city and area, even against his officials and feudal vassals.

In 974, the Emperor Otto II granted the Bishops of Bergamo civil jurisdiction over not only the city of Bergamo, and the suburbs to a distance of three miles, but also the Valle Seriate and other lands.

=== Bishop Arnulfus ===
Arnulfus, the successor of Bishop Atto, was the son of Vido (Guido) of the area called Landriano, in the territory of Milan. He was elected Bishop of Bergamo at some point between 19 October and 30 December 1077. His election was apparently quiet and canonical, since Pope Gregory VII refers to him in a letter of 21 June 1079 as having been reported to be receptive to papal counsel and obedient to his teaching: Arnulfum Berganebsus Ecclesiae electum, nostro libenter et consilio credere et praecepto oboedire. The Pope had been the recipient of several complaints against Bishop-elect Arnulfus, from several sources. He had apparently dispossessed a knight from his fief, and had sold the Archdiaconate of Bergamo for 50 pounds. Gregory ordered the Bishop of Como to look into the charges, and, if necessary, to apply the appropriate canonical penalties. Arnulfus appears to have escaped censure, though he still had not been consecrated by the end of the year 1079.

In 1098 Bishop Arnulfus again found himself in difficulties. He had chosen to support the schism of Archbishop Wibert of Ravenna, instigated by the Emperor Henry IV, and some German and north Italian bishops. On 8 April 1098, he was arraigned before the Council of Milan, presided over by Archbishop Anselm with the participation of bishops and archbishops from both southern France and Lombardy. It confirmed the sentence of anathema which had been leveled by Pope Urban II against Wibert (Guibertus), Obertus of Brescia, Arnulfus of Bergamo, Gregory of Vercelli, and Anselm of Novara. Arnulfus was deposed, and is said to have died in the same year. Quite the contrary, Arnulfus was able to maintain his seat, with the support of the Emperor Henry and his Antipope Celestine, all three of them schismatics. The situation inside the diocese became contentious. In 1101, the Canons of the Cathedral, led by the Archpriest Albertus de Zurlasco (Sorlasco) (there being no Archdeacon in office), appealed to the new pope Paschal II, for protection.

In a bull of 15 May 1101, countersigned by five cardinals, Pope Paschal replied positively to the Archdeacon Albertus and his brothers of the Bergamasque Church of S. Vincenzo living canonically, granting the request of the college of Canons and through them the Church of S. Vincenzo. For the present, the Pope announced, he decided that whatever they possessed from Catholic bishops and religious kings they should continue to hold, and so long as they remained in canonical discipline no one might disturb them in their possessions. No bishop or archpriest might have the faculty to redirect their property into another benefice or otherwise redirect their income, respecting (of course) the canonical rights of a Catholic bishop of Bergamo. The double reference to Catholic bishops highlights the fact that the incumbent was schismatic and intrusive, and had no canonical rights.

On 2 February 1106, another bull was received from Pope Paschal II, excommunicating Bishop Arnulfus and all the usurpers of the property of the Church of Bergamo. The decree was read from the pulpit of the Cathedral by the Archpriest Albertus.

Arnulf was succeeded by the monk Ambrosius de Mosso (Muzo), who was elected between November 1110 and before January 1112, when he signs himself Ambrosius Pergamensus electus. He was a Canon of the Cathedral Chapter, and was residing in Paris at the time of his election. It was said that he was elected by the Archpriest Albertus, with no other electors participating. Ambrosius' successor, Bishop Gregorius, was chosen by a compromise committee, composed of electors from the Cathedral Chapter of S. Alessandro, from the Cathedral Chapter of S. Vincenzo, and from city and suburban parish priests.

=== Election of 1309–1310 ===
Bishop Joannes Scanzo (1295–1309) died on 2 November 1309. The Chapter met and appointed two Vicars Capitular instead of the customary one: Alessandro de' Clementi and Cipriano degli Alessandri. The meeting to elect a new bishop was held on 21 November, and four scrutators were appointed: the Provost Alessandro de' Clementi, the Archpriest Lanfranco de' Colleoni, Canon Cipriano degli Alessandri, and Canon Manfredo de' Longhi. Canon Guglielmo de' Longhi was elected "by inspiration", and was proclaimed by the Provost in the Church of S. Vincenzo. Canon Guglielmo was not present, however, but on duty at Avignon. Four Canons were sent to Avignon to present the election certificate to the Electus, and to obtain his confirmation, investiture, and consecration.

The delegation presented the electoral certificate to Canon Guglielmo in Avignon on 30 December 1309, who requested time to examine the situation and to consult with God. On 17 January 1310, the delegates repeated their visitation, but were put off again. Finally, on 25 January 1310, Canon Guglielmo announced his decision to refuse the election. Since the refusal took place at the Papal Court, Canon Law would seem to place the right to elect a new bishop in the hands of Pope Clement V, and that is exactly what the Bergamasque historians argue. They make the next bishop, Canon Cipriano degli Alessandri, a papal appointment. Giuseppe Ronchetti, however, argues that signatures of Bishop-elect Cipriani, which read, Venerab. vir D. Ciprianus Pergomensis electus et confirmatus (29 July 1310), point to a second election by the Cathedral Chapter and then papal confirmation. Ciprianus was still Bishop-elect on 31 December 1310.

On 11 February 1347, Bishop Bernardus Trigardi consecrated the new Church of S. Agostino for the Order of Hermits of Saint Augustine.

In 1400 the plague struck the territory of Bergamo, killing an estimated 20,000 people.

=== The Case of Bishop Soranzo ===
Bishop Pietro Lippomano was transferred to the diocese of Verona on 18 February 1544. In his place Pope Paul III appointed Cardinal Pietro Bembo. Bembo, however, was only in priestly orders, having been ordained only four years earlier, at the age of 69. He was not in episcopal orders, and did not intend to reside in the diocese of Bergamo; he never resided in any of the dioceses to which he was appointed. To address this problem, on 18 July 1544 Pope Paul appointed Bishop Vincenzo Sorzano to be Bembo's Coadjutor Bishop in the diocese of Bergamo. Soranzo was created titular Bishop of Nicea (Turkey) to qualify him for the episcopal post. Sorzano was a long-standing friend of Bembo, ever since their days when Sorzano was a student in Padua and Bembo was resident there. When Bembo died in Rome on 19 January 1547, Sorzano succeeded to the bishopric.

In Rome Sorzano was acquainted not only with Cardinal Bembo, but also with Cardinal Reginald Pole and Vittoria Colonna, members of the circle of spirituali at Viterbo. All of these people were suspected of heresy and were being watched by the Roman Inquisition, whose head was Cardinal Gian Pietro Carafa. In the 1540s, the Inquisitor of Como and Bergamo was Fra Michele Ghislieri, O.P., whose attention was drawn to Sorzano by complaints from both civil and religious authorities. He was accused of possessing heretical literature. Though Ghislieri conducted an investigation, no charges were lodged. To the contrary, one of the members of the Roman Inquisition, Cardinal Marcello Cervini, employed Sorzano in 1550 for monastic visitations.

Impressed with Ghislieri's bravery and determination, Cardinal Carafa had him brought to Rome in 1551, and made him Comissary of the Holy Office of the Inquisition. In 1552 he was sent to Bergamo with orders to prepare a case against Bishop Sorzano. Based on his work, Sorzano was brought to Rome and lodged in the Castel Sant'Angelo. On 22 June 1552, Pope Julius III suspended Bishop Sorzano from office, and appointed Niccolò Duranti as Administrator of the diocese of Bergamo. Sorzano was not restored until 24 May 1554. But while Julius III lived, Sorzano was protected by the Pope's hostility to the Inquisition and by the interest of the Republic of Venice.

After the election of the Grand Inquisitor, Gian Pietro Carafa, as Pope Paul IV on 23 May 1555, the situation of Sorzano changed once again. His case was reopened by the Holy Office of the Inquisition, he was convicted, and, on 20 April 1558, he was deposed from the Bishopric of Bergamo by the Pope. All of his episcopal acts were declared null and void. He fled to Venice, where he died on 9 May 1558.

=== Cathedral and Chapter ===
The cathedral of Bergamo was dedicated to S. Alessandro of Bergamo, which lay outside the walls of the town. It was destroyed at the beginning of the 10th century, during the incursions of the Hungarians, and the remains of S. Alessandro were rescued and transferred to the church of S. Vincenzo, inside the city. The church of S. Alessandro was eventually rebuilt (and destroyed again in 1561), but the church of S. Vincenzo continued to serve as the cathedral during the 10th, 11th, and 12th centuries. Bergamo therefore had two cathedrals for several centuries, each with its own Chapter of Canons.

In 816, the Emperor Louis I held a council at Aix, at which it was ordered that Canons and Canonesses live together according to a set of rules (canons, regulae). In the Roman synod of Pope Eugene II of November 826, it was ordered that Canons live together in a cloister next to the church. In 876, the Council of Pavia decreed in Canon X that the bishops should enclose the Canons: uti episcopi in civitatibus suis proximum ecclesiae claustrum instituant, in quo ipsi cum clero secundum canonicam regulam Deo militent, et sacerdotes suos ad hoc constringant, ut ecclesiam non relinquant et alibi habitare praesumant. In 897, at the request of the Canons themselves, Bishop Adelbertus organized them into the Chapter of S. Vincenzo.

The Archdeacon is attested as early as 907, the Provost by 908, the Archpriest by 966, and the Primicerius by 929.

On 23 December 1189, an agreement was reached between the Chapter of S. Vincenzo and the Chapter of S. Alessandro to unite as a single body of Canons. The arrangement was approved by Pope Clement III on 21 June 1190. The two Chapters had been quarrelling for more than a half century, despite the examination of their case by three cardinals, and demands from Pope Lucius III, Pope Urban III, and Pope Gregory VIII that they settle their differences.

In 1691, the Chapter of the Cathedral was composed of four dignities and forty-four Canons. In 1855, there were four dignities (Archpriest, Theologus, Penitentiary, and Primicerius) and eleven other Canons.

=== Synods ===
A diocesan synod was an irregular but important meeting of the bishop of a diocese and his clergy. Its purpose was

1. to proclaim generally the various decrees already issued by the bishop;
2. to discuss and ratify measures on which the bishop chose to consult with his clergy;
3. to publish statutes and decrees of the diocesan synod, of the provincial synod, and of the Holy See.

A diocesan synod is known to have taken place as early as 897 under Bishop Adelbertus. Other early synods took place in 1000, 1081, 1143 (or 1144), 1187, 1285, 1295, and 1297.

A diocesan synod was held in Bergamo in 1304 by Bishop Giovanni da Scanzo. The tenth synod took place in 1451, the eleventh in 1453, and the twelfth in 1454.

Bishop Federico Cornaro (1561–1577) and his Metropolitan, Archbishop Carlo Borromeo of Milan, both attended the last sessions of the Council of Trent. On his return, Archbishop Borromeo held a provincial synod in Milan in August 1564, which Bishop Cornaro attended, where the decrees of the Council were discussed and adopted as statutes of the ecclesiastical province of Milan. Immediately on his return to Bergamo, Cornaro held his own diocesan synod, on 4–5 September, and announced the imposition of the tax authorized by the Council in its 23rd session (chapter 18), for the purpose of building a seminary for the diocese. Bishop Cornaro held another synod in May 1568, a third on 15 September 1574, and another on 30 April–2 May 1579.

As Apostolic Visitor of the diocese of Cremona, Bishop Gerolamo Ragazzoni of Bergamo (1577–1592) held a joint synod of the two dioceses in 1583, and issued a set of Constitutions.

Bishop Giambattista Milani (1592–1611) presided at three diocesan synods, his third on 4 September 1603. In 1613 Bishop Giovanni Emo (1611–1622) held his first diocesan synod, at which he promulgated a number of decrees. On 4 May 1628, Bishop Agostino Priuli (1627–1632) presided at a diocesan synod, and issued a set of constitutions and decrees, to which were added a number of papal bulls and decrees of Vatican congregations. Bishop Luigi Grimani (1633–1656) held his first diocesan synod on 4 June 1636. His second took place on 15 June 1648.

On 1 May 1653, Bishop Luigi Grimani (1633–1656) held a diocesan synod. On 1 September 1660, Bishop Gregorio Barbarigo (1657–1664) presided at a diocesan synod. On 15 May 1668, Bishop Daniele Giustiniani (1664–1697) issued a twenty-two-page set of Monita synodalia to the clergy of the diocese of Bergamo. To the document were annexed two sets of Opiniones damnatae in Congregatione generali Sancti Inquisitionis coram SS. D. N. P. Alexandro VII, forty-five in number. One condemned proposition was that a gentleman had the right to accept a challenge to a duel. Another was the notion that it was acceptable to kill a false accuser, false witnesses, and even a judge, to save an innocent person from being condemned to death.

The thirtieth diocesan synod took place on 5 June 1679. The thirty-first was held on 28 April 1687. The thirty-second synod took place on 4 September 1724.

Bishop Giacomo Maria Radini-Tedeschi (1905–1914) held a diocesan synod in 1910, the thirty-third in Roncalli's list. Bishop Luigi Maria Marelli (1915–1936) held the thirty-fourth diocesan synod on 20–22 August 1923.

In 2007, the diocese opened its 37th diocesan synod, a gathering dedicated to addressing problems and opportunities confronting parishes in the 21st century.

=== Seminary ===
The Council of Trent, in its 23rd Session, meeting on 15 July 1563, issued a decree, the 18th chapter of which required that every diocese have a seminary for the training of clergy.

In the diocesan synod of 4–5 September, Bishop Fernando Cornaro announced the imposition of the tax authorized by the Council for the purpose of building a seminary for the diocese. The bishop chose a location for the new seminary, at the Collegiate Church of San Matteo, which was administered by a Chapter composed of a Provost and four Canons. Houses were bought in the immediate vicinity, including two belonging to the Canons, to be used to house the seminarians. Archbishop Carlo Borromeo visited the seminary, and provided it with a set of statutes. In the time of Cornaro's successor, Gerolamo Ragazzoni, the number of students had increased to 25. In 1590, there were 22 clerics. There were two teachers, and the curriculum was extremely limited, grammar, catechism, Bible, patristic homilies, and works to develop the conscience. Bishop Grimani consolidated the buildings around a new courtyard in 1623, and Bishop Giustiniani became a successful fundraiser to support the seminary.

By the end of the 18th century, the number of students had outstripped the space available, and some of them had to be lodged in the former monastery of the Celestines. In 1821, with a legacy of Canon Marco Celio Passi, it was possible to acquire several buildings near S. Maria in Monte Santo, which made possible the reunification of the entire student body in one residence. The seminary buildings were so deteriorated by the end of the 1950s, however, that Bishop Giuseppe Piazzi was compelled to rebuild the seminary, for which he had the support of Pope John XXIII, who had taught at the seminary, and Cardinal Gustavo Testa, a native of Bergamo. The project was finally completed in 1967.

In 1934, while he was still Coadjutor Bishop of Bergamo (1932–1936), Bishop Adriano Bernareggi established a new minor seminary (middle and high school) in the town of Clusone, in the mountains north of Bergamo.

=== Parishes ===
The 390 parishes all fall within the Lombardy region. 375 are within the civil Province of Bergamo, 14 in the civil Province of Lecco, and one in the civil Province of Brescia. In the diocese of Bergamo in 2015, there was one priest for every 1,010 Catholics.

For historical reasons a number of the parishes in the diocese celebrate the liturgy but according to the Ambrosian Rite, rather than according to the Roman Rite. They are the vicariate of Calolzio-Caprino (Calolziocorte, Caprino Bergamasco, Carenno, Cisano Bergamasco, Erve, Monte Marenzo, Torre de' Busi and Vercurago) and the parishes of Averara, Brumano, Cassiglio, Cusio, Ornica, Santa Brigida, Taleggio, Valtorta and Vedeseta.

=== Missionary activities ===
The diocese maintains strong relations with the Roman Catholic Archdiocese of Cochabamba in Bolivia. Priests of the diocese work in parishes in Cuba and Côte d'Ivoire.

== Bishops ==
=== to 1200 ===
- Narnus (between C. 374 and c. 397)
- Viator
- Anonymous
- Anonymous

...

- Dominator
- Stephanus
- Claudianus
- Simplicianus
- Babianus
- Quintianus

...

- Praestantius (attested 451)

...

- Laurentius (attested 501)

...

- Joannes (d. 556)

...

- Joannes (668–690)
- Antoninus (acceded c. 691 ?)
- Antonius
- Aginus (c. 758 – c. 797)
- Tachipaldus (c. 797 – c. 814)
- Grasmond (attested 829)
- Hagano (Aganone) (c. 840 – c. 863)
- Garibaldus (c. 867 – c. 888)
- Adelbertus (attested 894–929)
- Recho (attested 938–953)
- Odelricus (attested 954–968)
- Ambrosius (c. 970–973)
- Giselbertus (attested 975– after 982)
- Azo (attested 987–996)
- Reginfredus (attested 996–1013)
- Alcherius (attested 1013–1022)
- Ambrosius (attested 1023–1057)
- Atto (1058 – c. 1075/1077)
- Arnulfus (1077–1098)

Arnulfus (1098–1106) Schismatic

- Ambrosius (1111 ? – 1133)
- Gregorius (1133–1146)
- Girardus (1146–1167)
- Guala (1167–1186)
- Lanfrancus (1186 – after June 1211)

=== 1200 to 1500 ===
- Giovanni Tornielli (1211–1231)
- Atto (1231–1240)
- Henricus de Sessa (1241–1242)
- Alberto da Terzo (1242–1251)
- Algisio da Rosciate, O.P. (1251–1259)
- Erbordo, O.P. (1260–1272)
- Guiscardo Suardi (8 Jul 1272 – 22 Feb 1282 Died)

Sede vacante (1282–1289)

- Robertus Benghi (1289–1291)

Sede vacante (1291–1295)

- Joannes Scanzo (1295–1309)
- Cyprianus Alessandri (1310–1341)
- Nicolaus Canali (1342)
- Bernardus Trigardi, O.Cist. (1342–1349)
- Lanfrancus Salvetti, O.Min. (1349–1381)
- Matteo de Agaciis, O.Min. (1381– ) Avignon Obedience
- Branchinus Besoccio (1381–1399) Roman Obedience
- Ludovico Bonito (1399–1401) Roman Obedience
- Francesco Lante, O.Min. (1401–1403) Roman Obedience
- Francesco de Regatiis, O.Min. (1403–1427)
- Polidoro Foscari (1437–1449)
- Giovanni Barozzi (1449–1465)
- Ludovico Donato (Donà) (1465–1484)
- Lorenzo Gabriel (1484–1512)

=== 1500 to 1800 ===
- Niccolò Lippomano (17 Jul 1512 –1516)
- Pietro Lippomano (1516–1544)

Pietro Bembo, O.S.Io.Hieros. (1544–1547) Administrator

- Vittore Soranzo (1547–1558)
- Luigi Lippomano (1558–1559)

Cardinal Luigi Cornaro (1560–1561) Administrator

- Federico Cornaro (seniore), O.S.Io.Hieros. (1561–1577)
- Gerolamo Ragazzoni (1577–1592)
- Giambattista Milani, C.R. (8 Apr 1592 – 1611 Resigned)
- Giovanni Emo (18 Apr 1611 – 16 Oct 1622 Died)
- Federico Baldissera Bartolomeo Cornaro (23 Feb 1623 – 7 Sep 1626)
- Agostino Priuli (8 Feb 1627 – 4 Oct 1632 Died)
- Luigi Grimani (12 Jan 1633 – 4 Dec 1656 Died)
- Gregorio Barbarigo (9 Jul 1657 – 24 Mar 1664)
- Daniele Giustiniani (23 Jun 1664 – 11 Jan 1697 Died)
- Luigi Ruzini (27 Jan 1698 – 18 Mar 1708 Died)
- Cardinal Pietro Priuli (14 May 1708 – 22 Jan 1728 Died)
- Leandro di Porzia (Porcia), O.S.B. (12 Apr 1728 – 18 Nov 1730 Resigned)
- Antonio Redetti (22 Nov 1730 – 4 May 1773 Died)
- Marco Molin, O.S.B. (13 Sep 1773 – 2 Mar 1777 Died)
- Giampaolo Dolfin, C.R.L. (28 Jul 1777 – 19 May 1819 Died)

=== Since 1821 ===
- Pietro Mola (8 Jan 1821 – 16 Jan 1829 Died)
- Carlo Gritti Morlacchi (28 Feb 1831 – 17 Dec 1852 Died)
- Pietro Luigi Speranza (19 Dec 1853 – 4 Jun 1879 Died)
- Gaetano Camillo Guindani (Guindari) (19 Sep 1879 – 21 Oct 1904 Died)
- Giacomo Maria Radini-Tedeschi (20 Jan 1905 – 22 Aug 1914 Died)
- Luigi Maria Marelli (22 Jan 1915 – 14 Apr 1936 Died)
- Adriano Bernareggi (14 Apr 1936 – 23 Jun 1953 Died)
- Giuseppe Piazzi (1 Oct 1953 – 5 Aug 1963 Died)
- Clemente Gaddi (25 Sep 1963 – 20 May 1977 Retired)
- Giulio Oggioni (20 May 1977 – 21 Nov 1991 Retired)
- Roberto Amadei (21 Nov 1991 – 22 Jan 2009 Retired)
- Francesco Beschi (22 Jan 2009 – )

== See also ==
- Timeline of Bergamo
- Pope John XXIII, a native of Sotto il Monte, near Bergamo
- Cardinal Giorgio Gusmini, a native of Gazzaniga, and student at the seminary of Bergamo.

== Bibliography ==
=== Reference works ===
- Gams, Pius Bonifatius (1873). Series episcoporum Ecclesiae catholicae: quotquot innotuerunt a beato Petro apostolo. Ratisbon: Typis et Sumptibus Georgii Josephi Manz. pp. 777–779. (in Latin)
- Eubel, Conradus, ed. (1913). Hierarchia catholica. Vol. Tomus 1 (second ed.). Münster: Libreria Regensbergiana. (in Latin)
- Eubel, Conradus, ed. (1914). Hierarchia catholica. Vol. Tomus 2 (second ed.). Münster: Libreria Regensbergiana. (in Latin)
- Gulik, Guilelmus (1923). Eubel, Conradus (ed.). Hierarchia catholica. Vol. Tomus 3 (second ed.). Münster: Libreria Regensbergiana. (in Latin)
- Gauchat, Patritius (Patrice) (1935). Hierarchia catholica. Vol. Tomus IV (1592-1667). Münster: Libraria Regensbergiana. (in Latin)
- Ritzler, Remigius; Sefrin, Pirminus (1952). Hierarchia catholica medii et recentis aevi V (1667-1730). Patavii: Messagero di S. Antonio.
- Ritzler, Remigius; Sefrin, Pirminus (1958). Hierarchia catholica medii et recentis aevi. Vol. Tomus VI (1730-1799). Patavii: Messagero di S. Antonio. (in Latin)
- Ritzler, Remigius; Sefrin, Pirminus (1968). Hierarchia Catholica medii et recentioris aevi sive summorum pontificum, S. R. E. cardinalium, ecclesiarum antistitum series... A pontificatu Pii PP. VII (1800) usque ad pontificatum Gregorii PP. XVI (1846) (in Latin). Vol. VII. Monasterii: Libr. Regensburgiana.
- Remigius Ritzler; Pirminus Sefrin (1978). Hierarchia catholica Medii et recentioris aevi... A Pontificatu PII PP. IX (1846) usque ad Pontificatum Leonis PP. XIII (1903) (in Latin). Vol. VIII. Il Messaggero di S. Antonio.
- Pięta, Zenon (2002). Hierarchia catholica medii et recentioris aevi... A pontificatu Pii PP. X (1903) usque ad pontificatum Benedictii PP. XV (1922) (in Latin). Vol. IX. Padua: Messagero di San Antonio. ISBN 978-88-250-1000-8.
- Statistica della diocesi di Bergamo (in Italian). Vol. Anno IV. Bergamo: Crescini. 1855.

=== Studies ===
- Cappelletti, Giuseppe (1856). Le chiese d'Italia dalla loro origine sino ai nostri giorni (in Italian). Vol. undecimo. Venice: G. Antonelli. pp. 445–541.
- Caprioli, Adriano (1988). Diocesi di Bergamo (in Italian). Brescia: La Scuola. ISBN 978-88-350-7759-6.
- Carlsmith, Christopher (2010). A Renaissance Education: Schooling in Bergamo and the Venetian Republic, 1500-1650. University of Toronto Press. ISBN 978-0-8020-9254-0.
- Dentella, Lorenzo (1939). I vescovi di Bergamo: (notizie storiche) (in Italian). Bergamo: Ed. Sant'Alessandro.
- Kehr, Paul Fridolin (1913). Italia pontificia : sive, Repertorium privilegiorum et litterarum a romanis pontificibus ante annum 1598 Italiae ecclesiis, monasteriis, civitatibus singulisque personis concessorum. Vol. VI. pars i. Berolini: Weidmann. pp. 357–397. (in Latin).
- Lanzoni, Francesco (1927). Le diocesi d'Italia dalle origini al principio del secolo VII (an. 604), vol. II, Faenza 1927. (in Italian)
- Lupi, Mario (1784). Josephus Ronchetti (ed.). Codex diplomaticus civitatis, et ecclesiæ Bergomatis (in Latin). Vol. primum. Bergamo: Vincenzo Antoine.
- Lupi, Marius (1799). Josepho Ronchetti (ed.). Codex diplomaticus civitatis et ecclesiae Bergomatis. Vol. secundum. Bergamo: Vincenzo Antoine.
- Ronchetti, Giuseppe; Lupi, Mario (1805). Memorie istoriche della città e Chiesa di Bergamo raccolte dal codice diplomatico... dal principio del 5. secolo di nostra salute sino all'anno 1428 (in Italian). Vol. Tomo I. Bergamo: dalla Tipografia di Alessandro Natali. Ronchetti, Giuseppe (1806). Tomo II. Ronchetti, Giuseppe (1807). Tomo III. Ronchetti, Giuseppe (1817). Tomo IV. Ronchetti, Giuseppe (1818). Tomo V. Ronchetti, Giuseppe (1819). Tomo VI. Ronchetti, Giuseppe (1839). Tomo VII.
- Ughelli, Ferdinando; Coleti, Niccolò (1719). Italia sacra sive De episcopis Italiæ, et insularum adjacentium (in Latin). Vol. Tomus quartus (4). Venice: apud Sebastianum Coleti. pp. 404–519.
