= Sant'Alessandro della Croce, Bergamo =

Church in Bergamo, Lombardy, Italy

Coordinates: 45°42′4.67″N 9°40′23.36″E

Sant'Alessandro della Croce is a Baroque style, Roman Catholic church located on Via Pignolo in Bergamo, region of Lombardy, Italy.

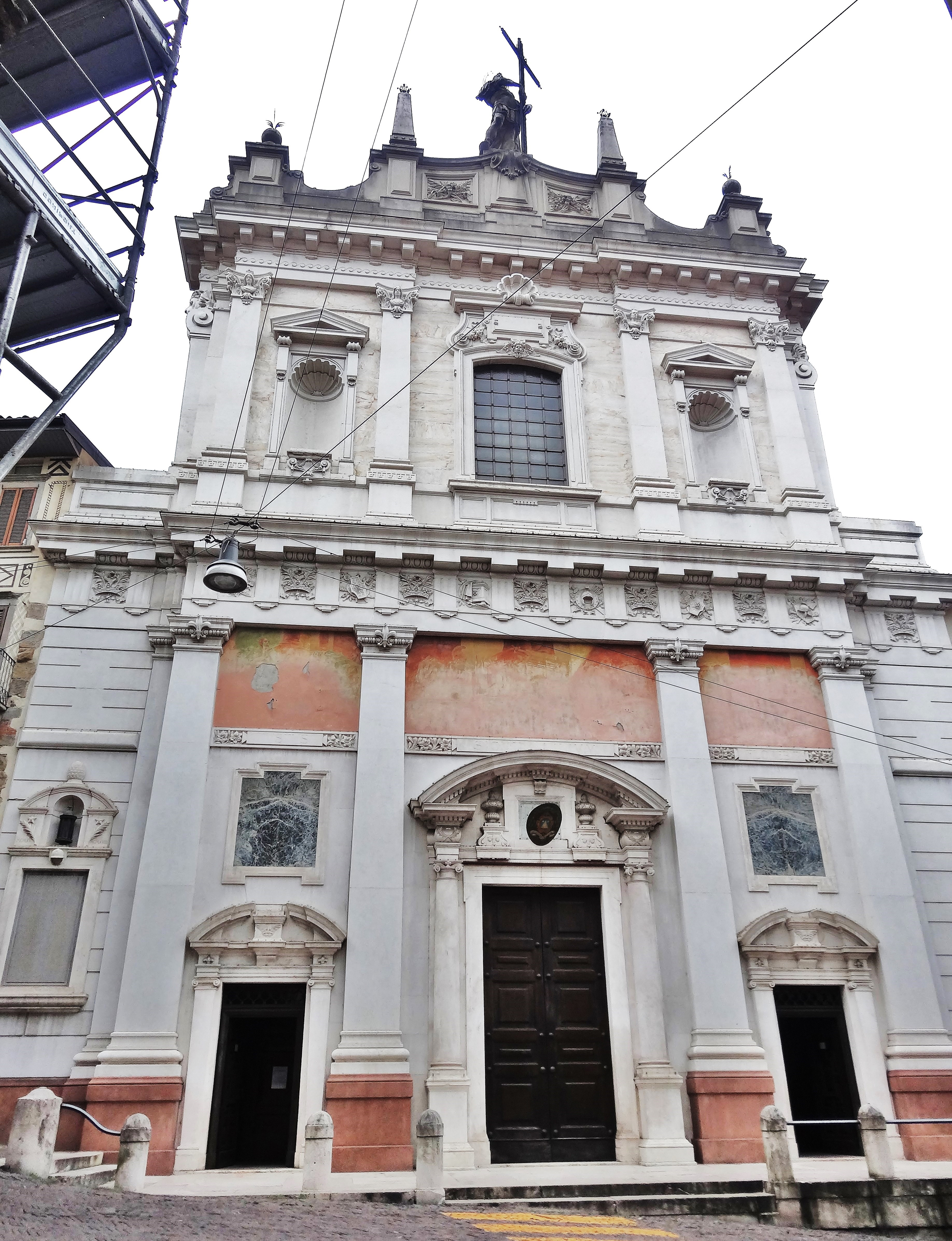
The facade of the church

== History ==
After Arnulf of Carinthia's siege of Bergamo in 894, the Bishop of the city, Adalberto (alternately spelled as Adelberto or Adelbertus) was reported to have rebuilt "an old Alexandrian basilica" that had been flattened during the war. Whether San'tAlessandro della Croce is that same church is highly contested, with both the Bergamo Cathedral and the demolished Chiesa di Sant'Alessandro in Colonna claiming to be.

Among the works inside the church is a Coronation of the Virgin (1576) by Giovanni Battista Moroni, and canvases by Giovanni Paolo Cavagna and Enea Salmeggia (1621). A canvas of St Carlo Borromeo tending those afflicted with plague (1720) by Giovanni Battista Parodi. The decoration of the Chapel of Suffragio (1730) was painted by Sebastiano Ricci, who depicted St Gregory the Great intercedes with the Virgin. The chapel was also has a canvas by Cignaroli depicting Story of Judas Maccabee (1743). Cignaroli also painted a large Deposition (1745) located in the right transept; Giovanni Battista Pittoni painted a Madonna and Saints (1746; 3rd chapel on left); Francesco Cappella painted an Encounter of Christ and the Virgin for the Altar of the Assunta (1774); and Giovanni Raggi painted for the Chapel of the Oration (1757). This chapel is dedicated to the Eucharist, and has a polychrome marble altar 1729 by Andrea Fantoni.
