= Da Ponte =

Da Ponte or dal Ponte is a topographic byname/surname literally meaning "from the bridge". Notable people with the name include:

- Antonio da Ponte (1512–1597), Venetian architect and engineer
- Duarte da Ponte Ribeiro (1795–1878), Portuguese-Brazilian physician and diplomat
- Enzo da Ponte
- Daniel Da Ponte
- Duarte da Ponte Ribeiro
- Durant da Ponte
- Francesco da Ponte
- Giovanni da Ponte:
  - Giovanni Battista da Ponte
  - Giovanni Maironi da Ponte
  - Giovanni da Santo Stefano da Ponte
  - Giovanni dal Ponte
- Girolamo da Ponte
- José Maria da Ponte e Horta
- Leandro da Ponte Bassano
- Lorenzo Da Ponte
- Nicolò da Ponte
- Pietro Antonio Da Ponte
- Rodolfo da Ponte
- Vincenta Da Ponte

== See also ==
- Dupont (surname)
- De Ponte
- Ponte (surname)
- Luis de la Puente
