= Olera Altarpiece =

Polyptych by Cima da Conegliano

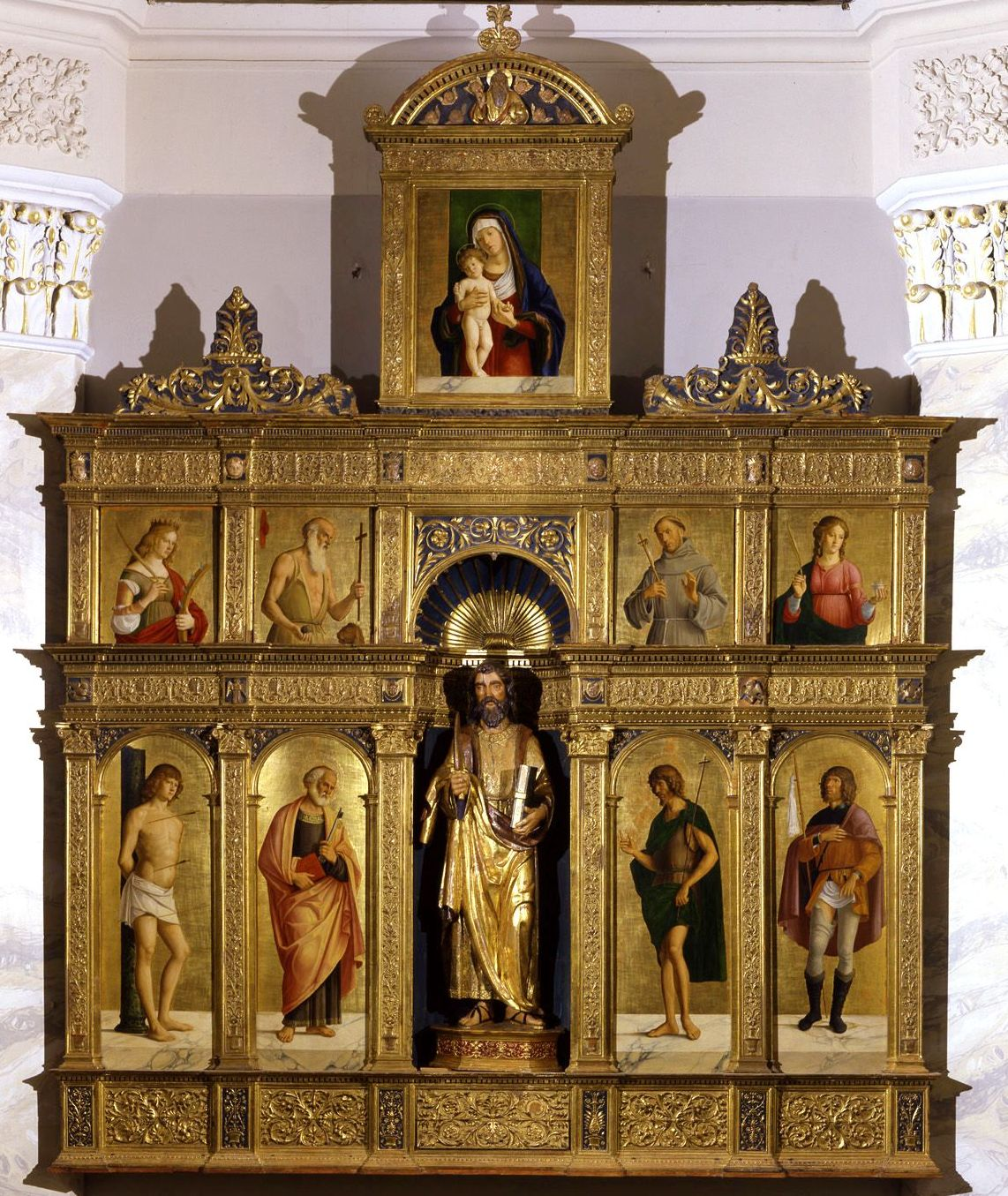
The Olera Altarpeice (c. 1486–1488)

Olera Altarpiece is an oil on panel nine-panel altarpiece by Cima da Conegliano, created c. 1486–1488, housed in the parish church in Olera.

The upper central panel shows the Madonna and Child, above a register of four saints (left to right, Catherine of Alexandria, Jerome, Francis of Assisi and Lucy). The lower panels are full-length and show (from left to right) Sebastian, Peter, John the Baptist and Roch to the right. The bottom two registers flank a sculpture of Saint Bartholomew, to whom the church is dedicated.

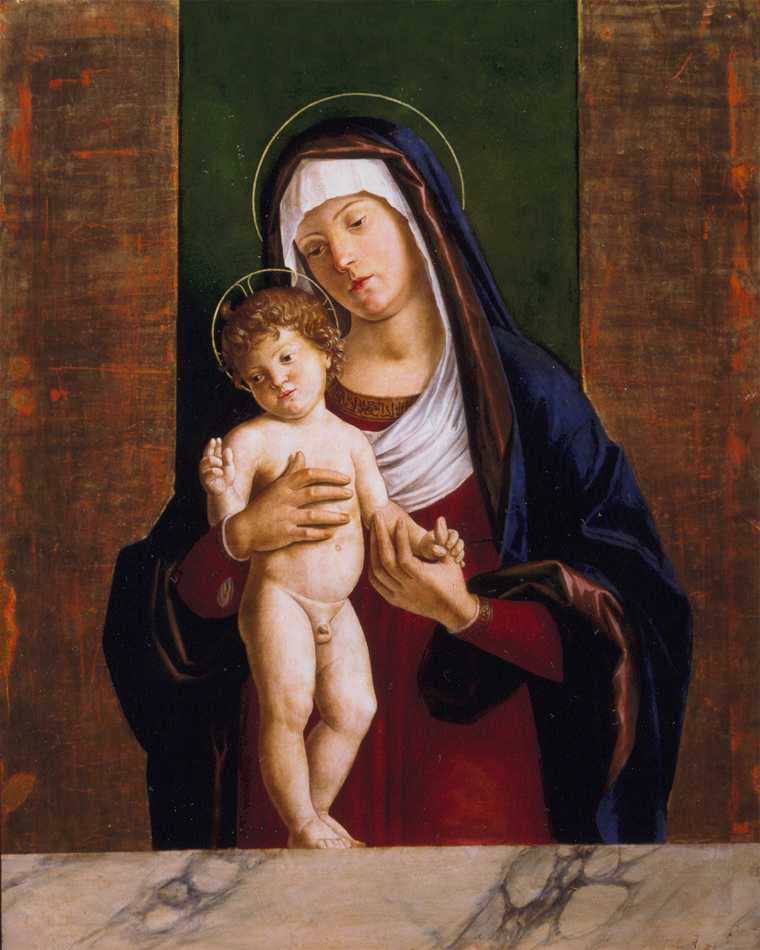
Madonna and Child

It was listed on a pastoral visit by Vittore Soranzo on 10 October 1547 as a "singular beautiful icon", while Carlo Borromeo called it an "icona magnam inajuratam et ornatam". The parish archive was destroyed in 1630, meaning no details survive on its commission, though the central statue shows it was commissioned for the church in which it now stands

In 1820 Giovanni Maironi da Ponte attributed the work to Alvise Vivarini.

It was restored in 1958 by Angelo Gritti.
