= Dupont (surname) =

Dupont, also spelled as DuPont, duPont, Du Pont, or du Pont is a French surname meaning "of the bridge", historically indicating that the holder of the surname resided near a bridge. As of 2008, the name was the fourth most popular surname in Belgium, and as of 2018, it was the 26th most popular in France.

People with the surname include:

- Aimé Dupont (1841–1900), Belgian-born American photographer
- Alfred I. du Pont (1864–1935), American industrialist, financier, philanthropist, cellist
- Ambroise Dupont (1937–2025), French politician
- André Dupont (born 1949), Canadian ice hockey player
- Antoine Dupont (born 1996), French professional rugby union player
- Aurélie Dupont (born 1973), French ballet dancer
- Bernadette Dupont (born 1936), French politician
- Chantal duPont (1942–2019), Canadian multidisciplinary artist
- Charles H. DuPont (1805–1877), Florida Supreme Court justice
- Christian Dupont (born 1947), Belgian politician
- Clifford Dupont (1905–1978), president of Rhodesia
- Denise Dupont (born 1984), Danish curler
- E. A. Dupont (1891–1956), German movie director
- Éleuthère Irénée du Pont (1771–1834), founder of E. I. du Pont de Nemours and Company
- Gabriel Dupont (1878–1914), French composer
- George Dupont (c. 1844 – 1900), Thai soldier in American Civil War
- Ghislaine Dupont (1956–2013), French journalist
- Henry Dupont (1798–1873), French naturalist
- Herbert L. DuPont (born 1938), American physician, medical school professor, and medical researcher
- Hubert Dupont (born 1980), professional cyclist
- Irénée du Pont (1876–1963), U.S. businessman, president of DuPont
- Jacques Dupont (director) (1921–2013), French film director
- Jacques-Charles Dupont de l'Eure (1767–1855), French lawyer and statesman
- John du Pont (1938–2010), philanthropist, convicted of murdering Olympic wrestler Dave Schultz
- Judith Dupont (1925–2025), French psychoanalyst, translator, and editor
- Lana du Pont (1939–2025), American equestrian
- Leo Dupont (1797–1876), Venerable, Catholic religious figure
- Léon Dupont (1881–1956), Belgian athlete
- Leonard Dupont (1796–1828), French naturalist
- Madeleine Dupont (born 1987), Danish curler
- Margaret Osborne duPont (1918–2012), American tennis champion
- Micki DuPont (born 1980), Canadian ice hockey player
- Pete du Pont (1935–2021), American governor of Delaware
- Pierre Dupont de l'Étang (1765–1840), general of the French Revolutionary and Napoleonic Wars
- Pierre Dupont (1821–1870), French songwriter
- Pierre S. du Pont (1870–1954), president of E. I. du Pont de Nemours and General Motors
- Pierre Samuel du Pont de Nemours (1739–1817), French writer, economist, government official
- René Marie Albert Dupont (1929–2025), French Roman Catholic bishop in South Korea
- Richard G. Dupont (1943–2016), American politician
- Samuel Francis Du Pont (1803–1865), U.S. Navy admiral
- Tiffany Dupont (born 1981), American actress
- Zara DuPont (1869–1946), American suffragist

== See also ==
- du Pont family, one of the wealthiest families in the United States
- Andrée Dupont-Roc, French curler and coach
- Christian Dupont-Roc, French and Dutch curler
- Dominique Dupont-Roc (born 1963), French curler
- Nicolas Dupont-Aignan (born 1961), French politician
- Da Ponte
- De Ponte
