= Francesco Bassano =

Two Italian painters, grandfather and grandson, are named Francesco Bassano:

- Francesco Bassano the Elder (c. 1475–1539), Italian painter
- Francesco Bassano the Younger (1549–1592), Italian painter
