= Francesco Bassano the Younger =

Italian painter (1549–1592)

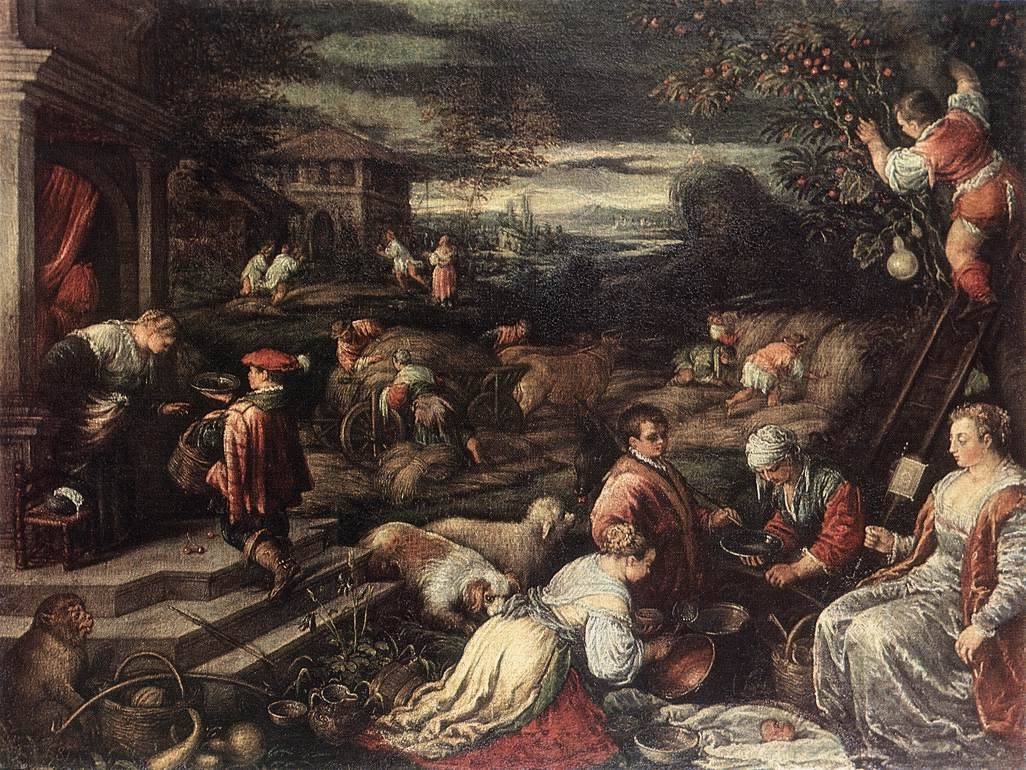
Summer, Hermitage Museum, St. Petersburg (1570-1580)

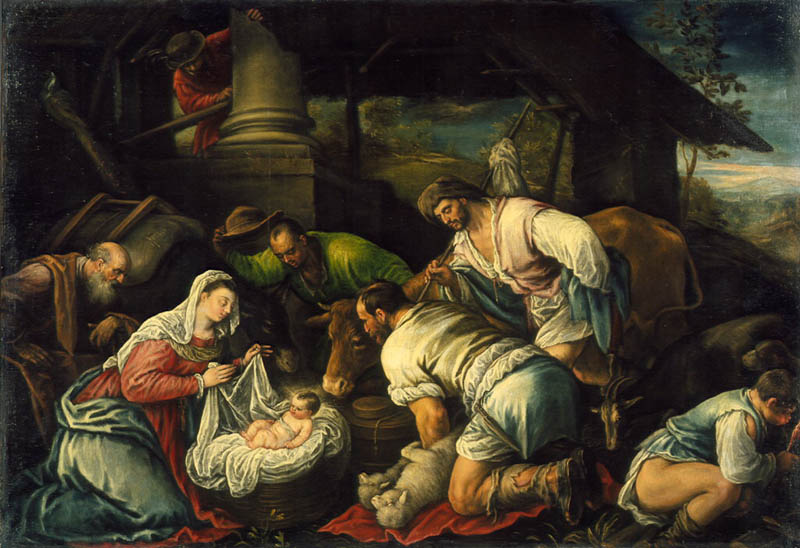
Adoration of the Shepherds

Francesco Bassano the Younger (Italian: Francesco Bassano il Giovane; 26 January 1549 – 4 July 1592), also called Francesco Giambattista da Ponte or Francesco da Ponte the Younger, was an Italian painter of the Renaissance period.

He was born at Bassano del Grappa near Venice, the eldest son of Jacopo Bassano and grandson of Francesco da Ponte the Elder. He studied with his father and worked in the Bassano family workshop along with his three brothers, including Giambattista, Girolamo and Leandro Bassano.

Francesco moved to Venice, where he ran the branch of the family business. He was also commissioned to paint a series of historical pictures in the Doge's Palace. He was prone to hypochondria, which exacerbated his other ailments, including possible depression. Soon after his father's death in 1592, Francesco committed suicide by throwing himself out of a window. His brother Leandro Bassano continued the family legacy of painting.
