= Del Ponte =

Del Ponte is a topographic surname. It belongs to an Italian noble family, hailing from Rome and Naples.

Notable people with this surname include:

- Ajla Del Ponte (born 1996), Swiss sprinter
- Amalia Del Ponte (1936–2025), Italian artist and designer
- Carla Del Ponte (born 1947), Swiss lawyer and former Chief Prosecutor of two United Nations international criminal law tribunals

== See also ==
- Ponte (surname), list of people with a similar surname
- De Ponte
