= Giovanni da Ponte =

Giovanni da Ponte may refer to:

  - Giovanni Battista da Ponte
  - Giovanni Maironi da Ponte
  - Giovanni da Santo Stefano da Ponte
  - Giovanni dal Ponte
