= Ludovico Annibale Della Croce =

Italian writer and classical scholar

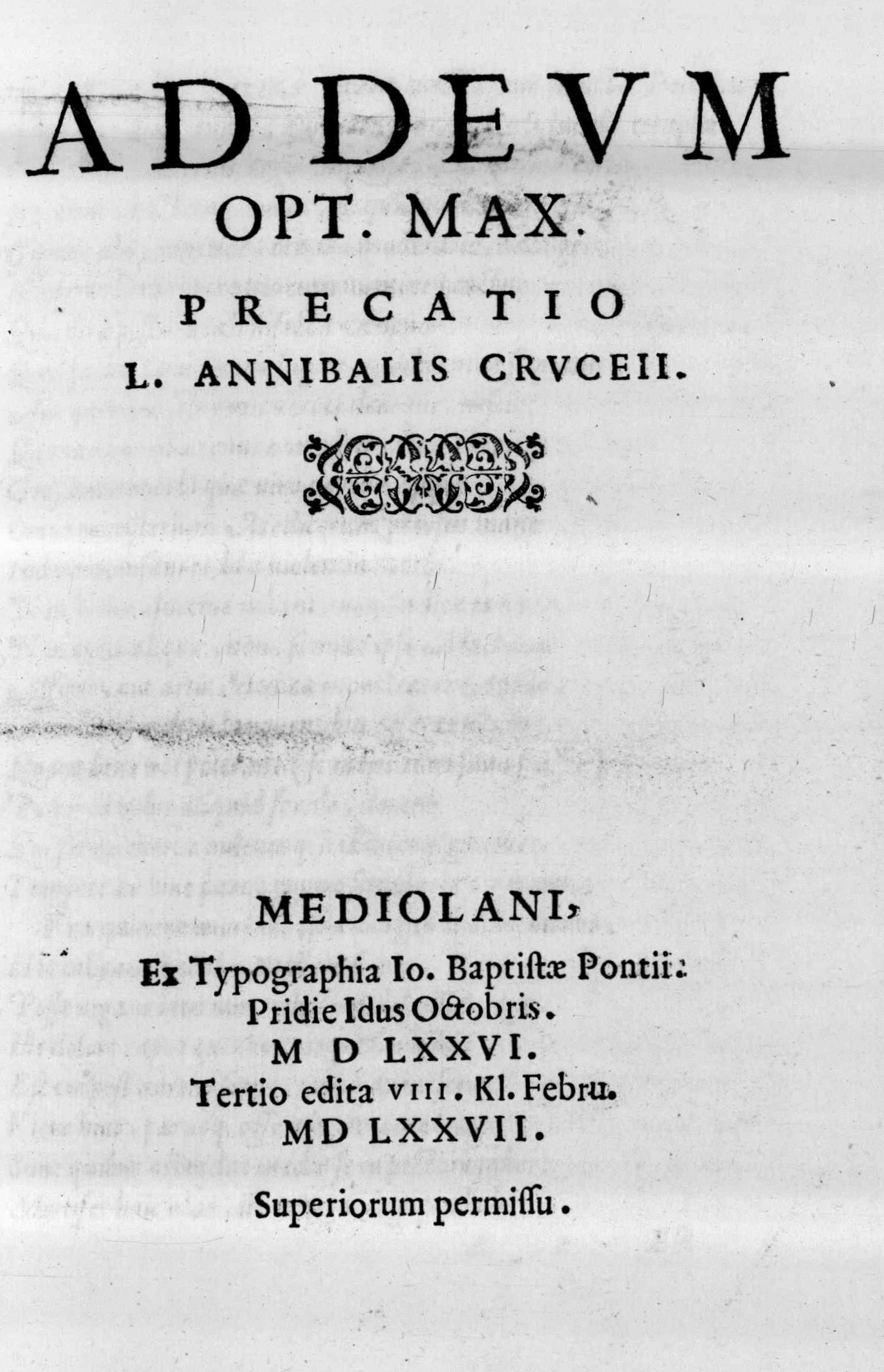
Title page of Ad Deum (1577)

Ludovico Annibale Della Croce (Latin: L. Annibalis Gruceii; 1499–1577) was a Milanese writer and classical scholar of the Italian Renaissance. From a manuscript of the Greek romance Leucippe and Clitophon he translated the last four books (books 5–8) into Latin (Lyon, 1544, with a dedication to Don Diego Hurtado de Mendoza). This text was the basis of French (Paris, 1545) and Italian (Venice, 1546) translations.

== Works ==
- Tatius, Achille (1544). Narrationis amatoriae [Achillis Tatii] fragmentum e graeco in latinum conversum, L. Annibale Cruceio interprete. Lyon.
- Ad Deum. Milan: Giovanni Battista da Ponte. 1577.
