= Jacopo Bassano =

Italian painter (1510–1591)

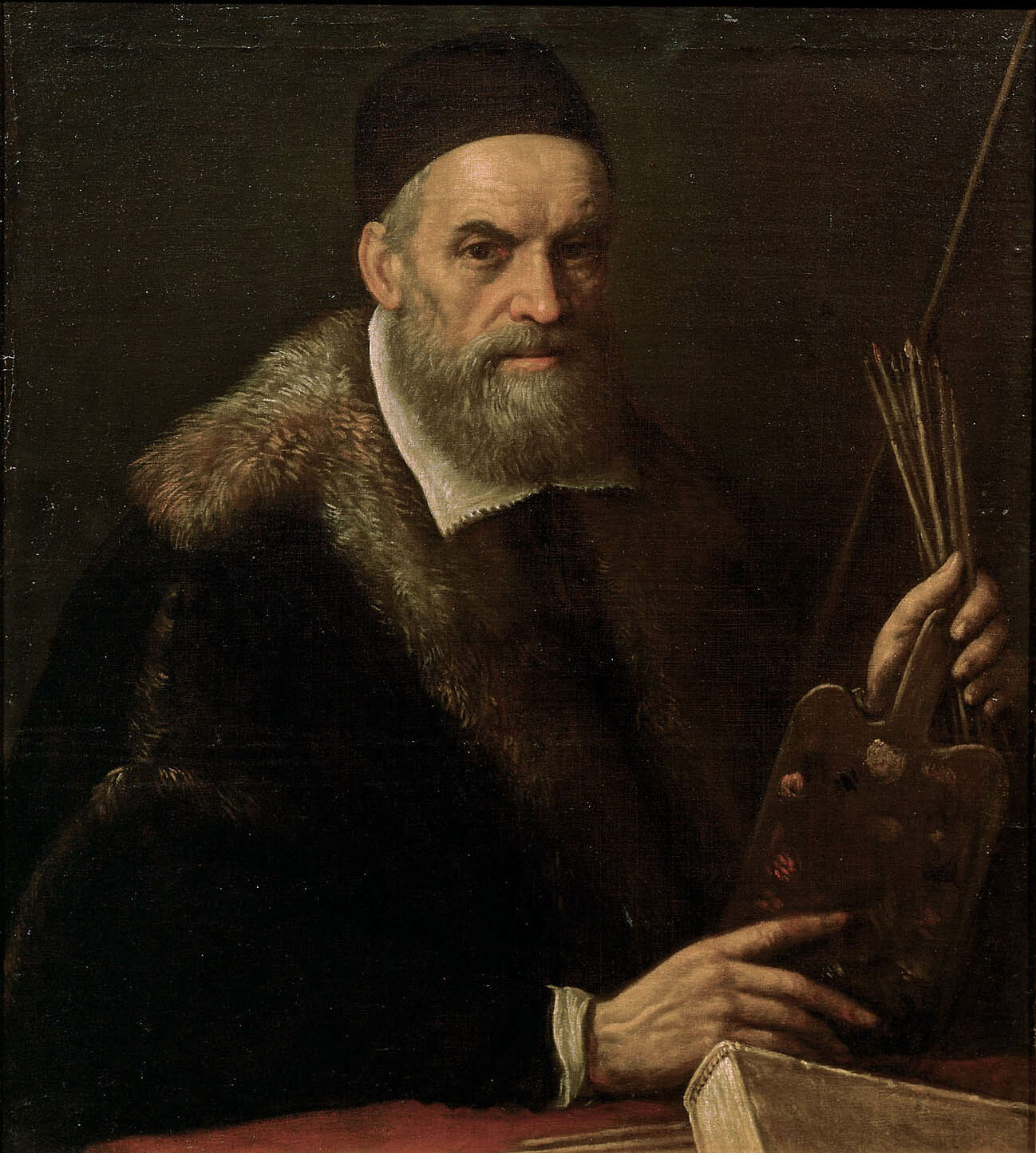
- Self-portrait in later age
- Born: Jacopo dal Ponte c. 1510; Bassano del Grappa, Republic of Venice
- Died: 14 February 1592 (aged 81–82); Bassano del Grappa, Republic of Venice
- Education: Bonifazio Veronese
- Occupation: Painter
- Notable work: The Supper at Emmaus (1538); Flight into Egypt (1544); Christ in the House of Mary and Martha (1577); Baptism of Christ (1590)
- Movement: Venetian school
- Children: Francesco; Giovanni Battista; Leandro; Girolamo
- Father: Francesco da Ponte

Jacopo Bassano (born Jacopo dal Ponte; c. 1510 – 14 February 1592) was an Italian Renaissance painter of the Venetian school. He was born and died in Bassano del Grappa, and took the small town as his surname. Having trained in the workshop of his father, Francesco the Elder, he spent much of the 1530s painting in Venice, before returning after 1539 to Bassano, where he remained, continuing the family workshop, which eventually included four of his sons. He painted mostly religious paintings, landscapes, and genre scenes. Indeed, he often treated biblical subjects in the manner of rural genre scenes, representing peasants, animals, and the agrarian landscape with great accuity. Bassano's pictures were very popular in Venice and, eventually, throughout Europe. His four sons – Francesco Bassano the Younger, Giovanni Battista da Ponte, Leandro Bassano, and Girolamo da Ponte – also became artists and followed him closely in style and subject matter.

== Life ==
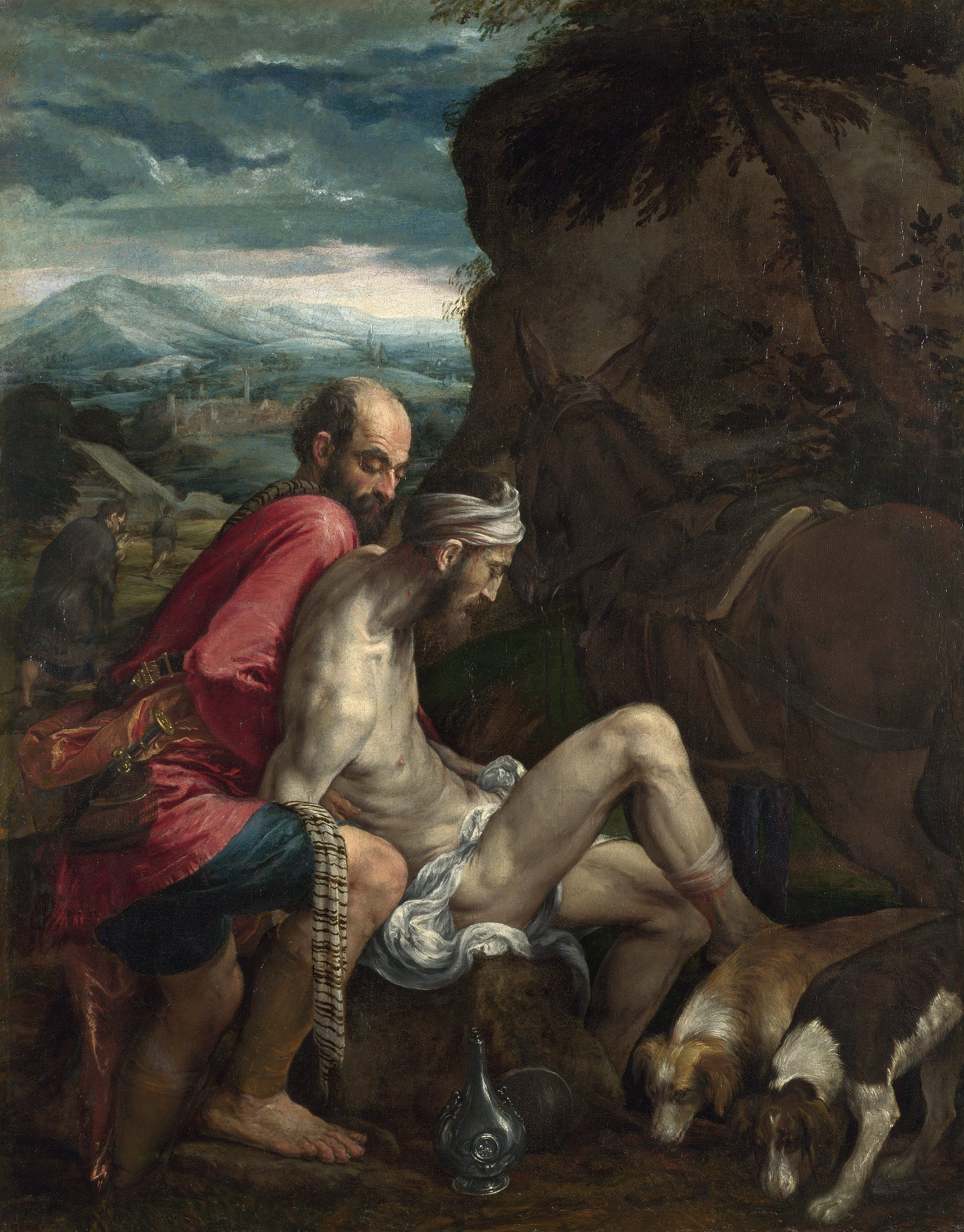
The Good Samaritan

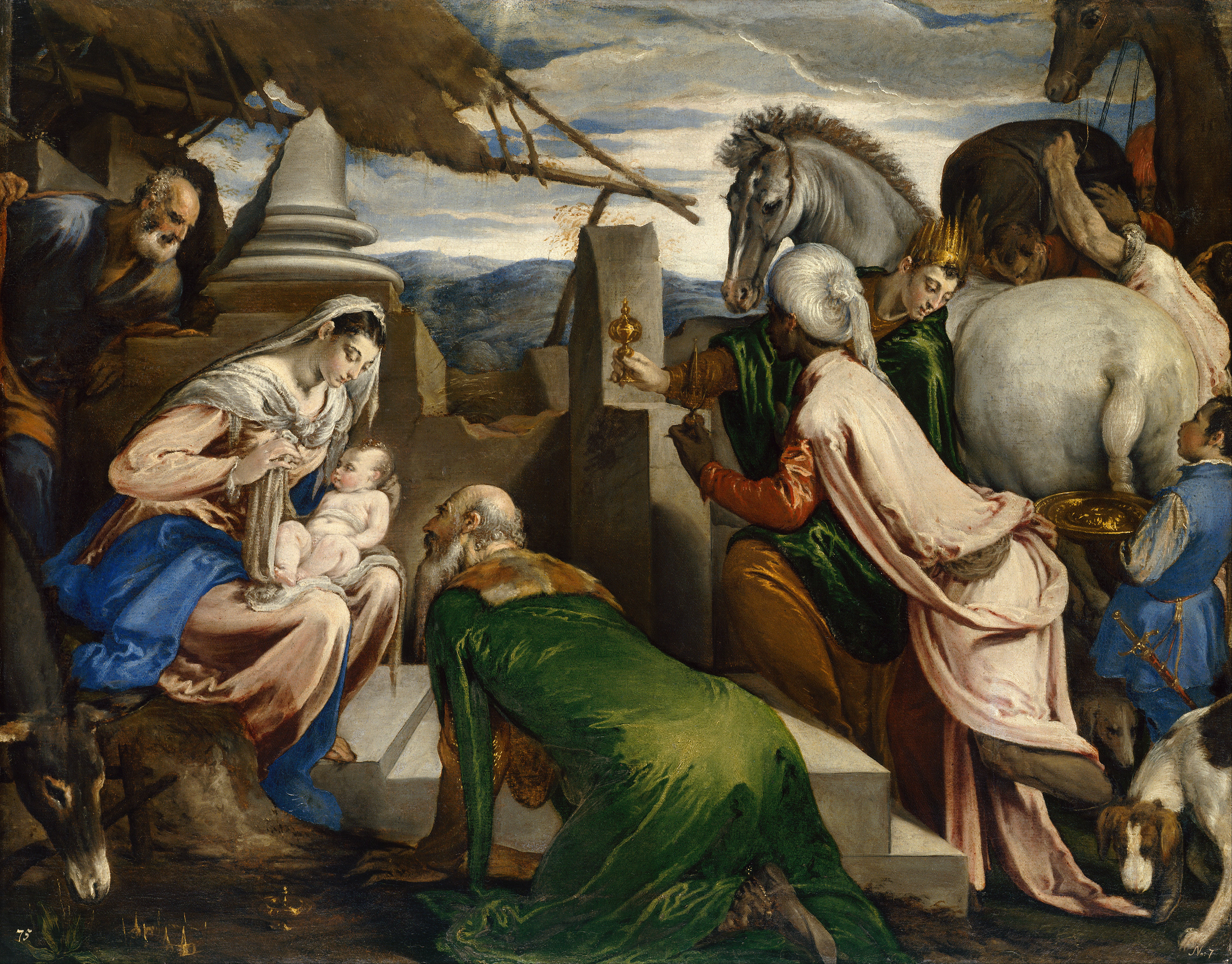
Jacopo da Ponte, called Jacopo Bassano – Adoration of the Magi

Jacopo Bassano was born around 1510 in the town of Bassano del Grappa, located about 65 km from the city of Venice. His father, Francesco the Elder, was a locally successful painter who had established a family workshop that produced mostly religious works. During his youth, Bassano was an apprentice in his father's workshop, where learned painting while also gaining experience in surveying, mapmaking, and engineering. His skill in these more practical disciplines helps to explain why the representation of the dynamic landscape of the Veneto would come to occupy such an important role in some many of his paintings. Bassano eventually made his way to Venice in the 1530s, where he may have studied under Bonifazio de Pitati (also known as Bonifazio Veronese) and certainly was exposed to the works of artists as Titian and il Pordenone.

After his father's death in 1539 he returned to Bassano del Grappa and permanently set up residence there, marrying a local woman, Elisabetta Merzari, in 1546. He took over the management of his family workshop, which would eventually come to include his four sons, Leandro Bassano, Francesco Bassano the Younger, Giovanni Battista da Ponte, and Girolamo da Ponte. After his death in 1592, his sons continued to produce numerous works in his style, making it difficult for later art historians to establish which pieces were created by Jacopo himself and which works were created at the hands of his progeny.

== Works ==
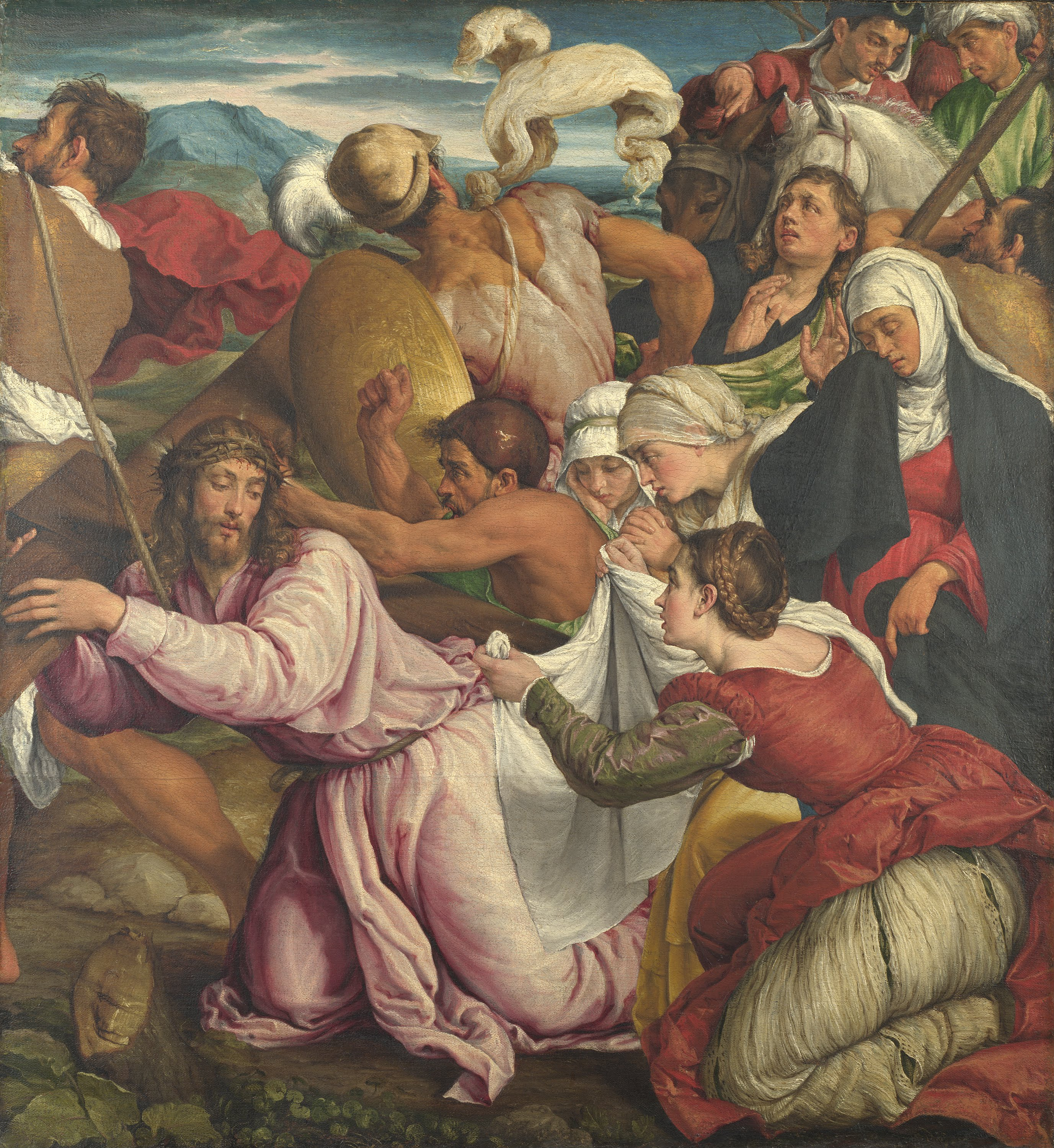
The Way to Calvary

Bassano's ability to experiment and absorb stylistic qualities from other contemporary artists is evident in the four distinct periods seen in his artistic legacy. Each period shows the artist's work in reconciling his own aesthetics with the styles of his peers.

=== Early works ===
Bonifazio de Pitati imparted upon his young pupil a lasting appreciation of Titian's work, the influence of which is clearly seen in his early pieces. Bassano's earliest paintings exhibit his lifelong obsession with brilliant colours that he had seen in Titian's beginning works, particularly in Bassano's Supper at Emmaus (1538). In this commission for a local church, Bassano fills the canvas with rich, luminous colours that help distinguish the figures from their surrounding environment. He breaks away from the practices of his contemporaries by placing the figure of Christ towards the back of the scene and allowing the lay people around him to play a more significant part in the composition of the piece. They are also unique in their dress. Instead of clothing his figures in the draping, shapeless fabrics many Renaissance artists equated with Classical Roman fashion, Bassano chose to feature figures in 16th-century clothing. The details of this piece are the most often discussed aspect of it. To many art historians his inclusion of various food on the tables, a dog lying down and a cat slinking around the chairs, as well as numerous secondary characters is a testament to Bassano's practice of drawing from life instead of relying on stylistic conventions of the age.

Bassano's paintings from the 1530-50s betray a range of artistic influences, including Dürer, Parmigianino, Tintoretto, and Raphael, whose compositions he would have known through prints, of which he must have been an avid collector.

=== Later Works ===
From the late 1550s onwards, Bassano's work was characterized by an interest in rustic subjects. Drawing upon pastoral paintings and prints by Titian and others, he created compositions which show shepherds and animals moving through the countryside. Rather than placing religious scenes in Classical Roman settings (as his Renaissance counterparts did), he placed figures in a more natural landscape, where the trees and the flowers were as carefully rendered as his figures. Many of his paintings are set in the landscape around his hometown of Bassano del Grappa. Frequently showing scenes of agricultural labor, these paintings reflect the ongoing effort to transform the Venetian mainland in to a more agriculturally productive region, but some of his works also seem to hint at the dangers of environmental mismanagement. Indeed, Bassano's altarpiece The Flood of the Colmeda, painted for the church of Santa Maria degli Angeli in Feltre in 1576, addresses the dangerous unintended consequences of aggressive human intervention into the landscape. The painting represents a devastating 1564 inundation that was widely understood to have been the result of deforestation and agricultural expansion.

Bassano also experimented with the representation of light in his later works. In the final decades of his career, he became one of the first artists to paint a "nocturne", or a painting in a nighttime landscape with artificial lighting. This type of painting was extremely popular with local audiences and made Bassano paintings highly valued.

Paintings

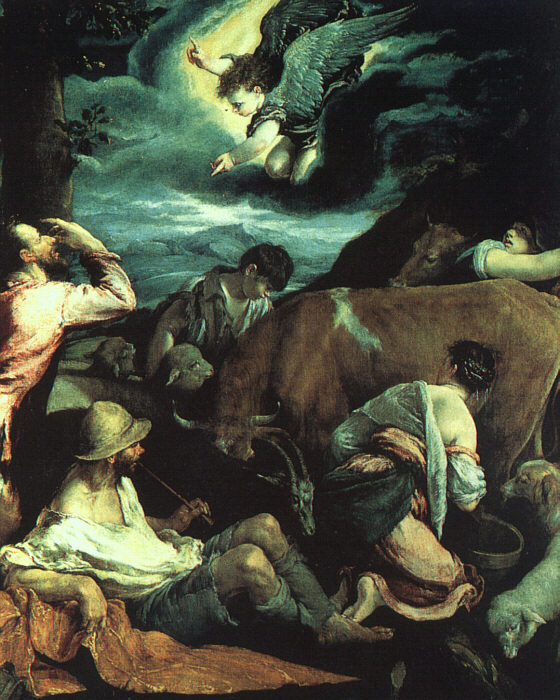
The Annunciation to the Shepherds (1533), Belvoir Castle

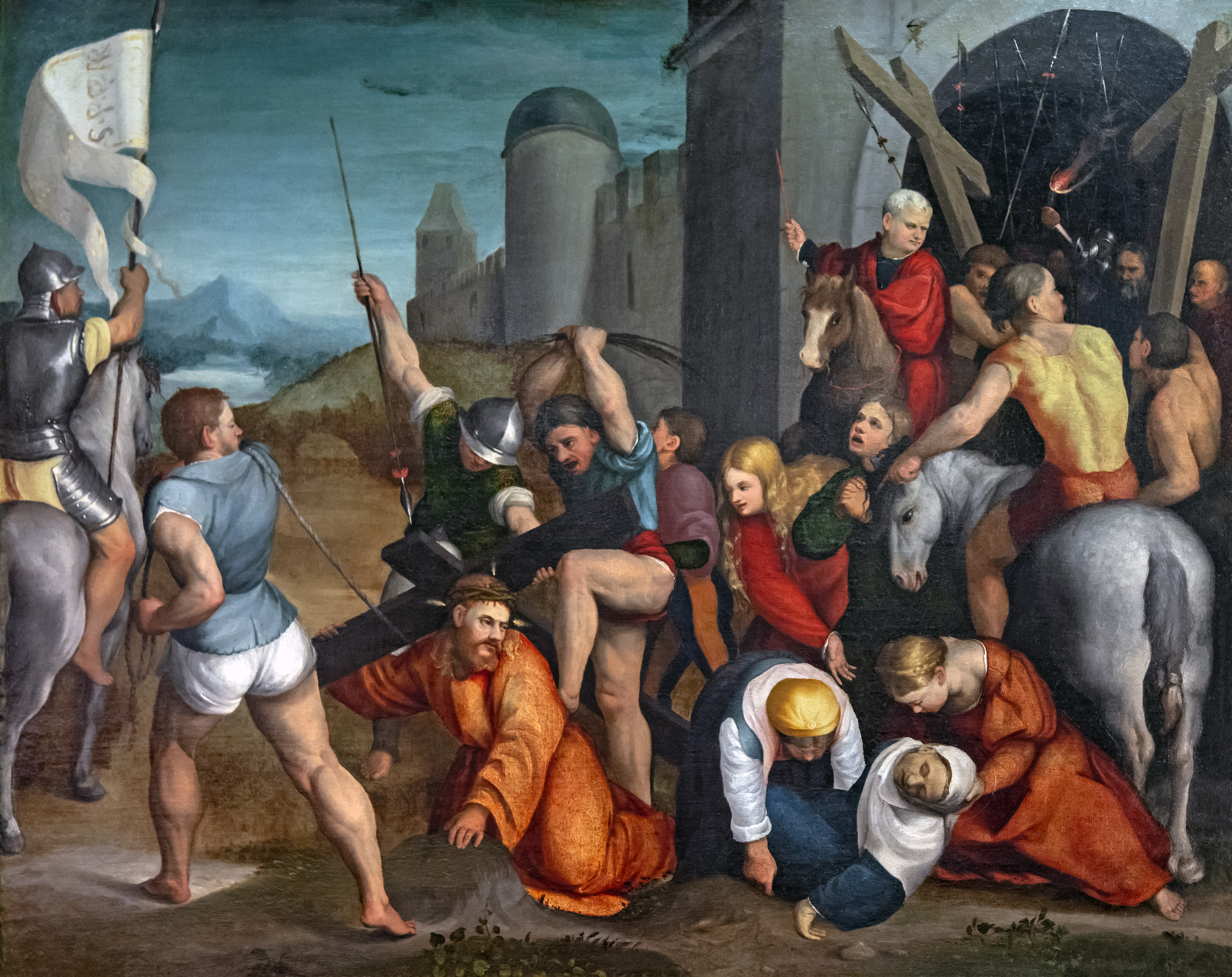
The Way to Calvary (1535-1538), Fondation Bemberg

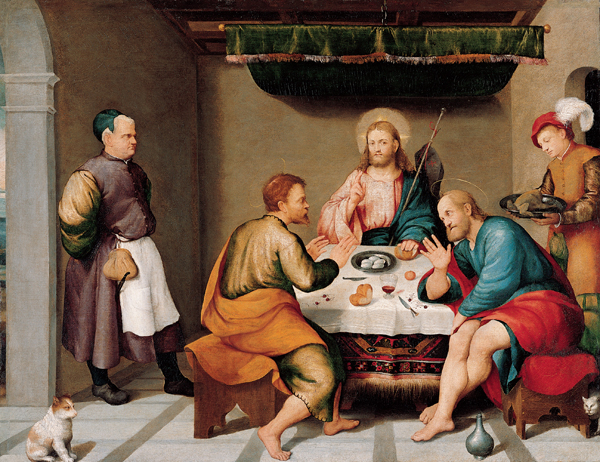
Supper at Emmaus (1538), Kimbell Art Museum

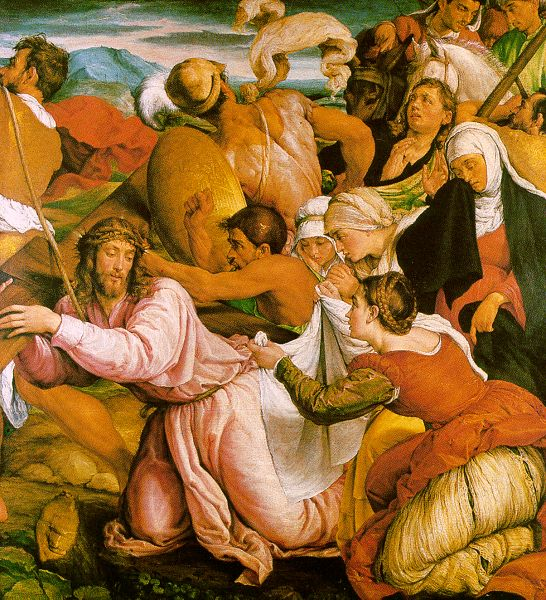
The Procession to Calvary (1540), The National Gallery

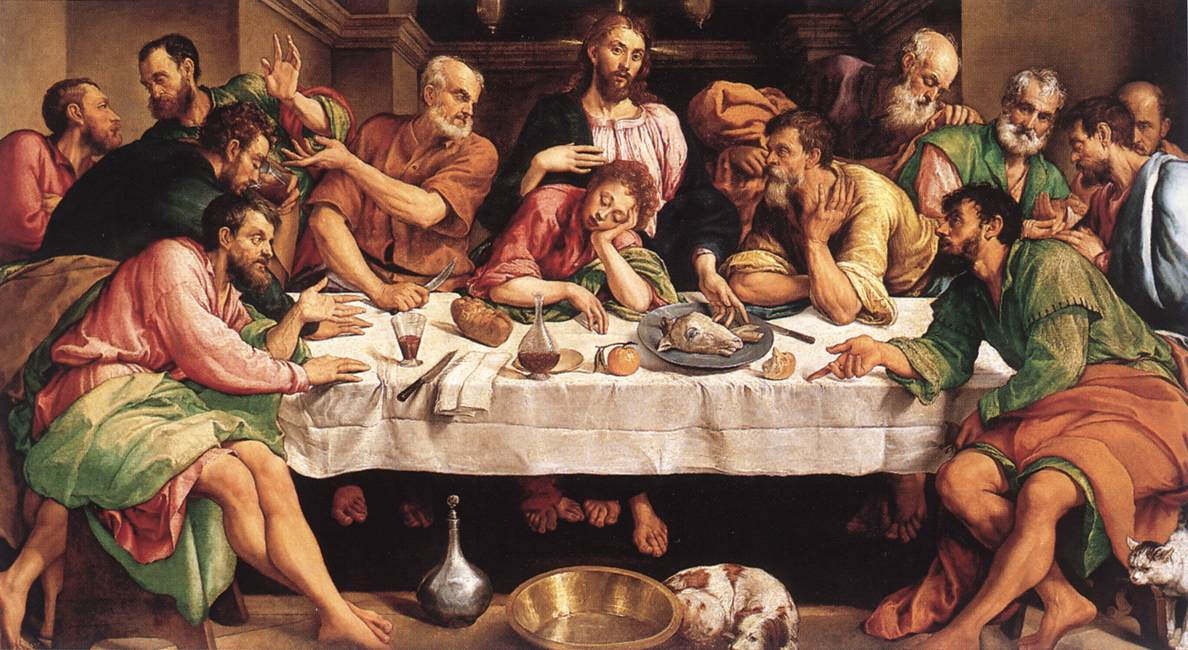
The Last Supper, 1542, Galleria Borghese, Rome

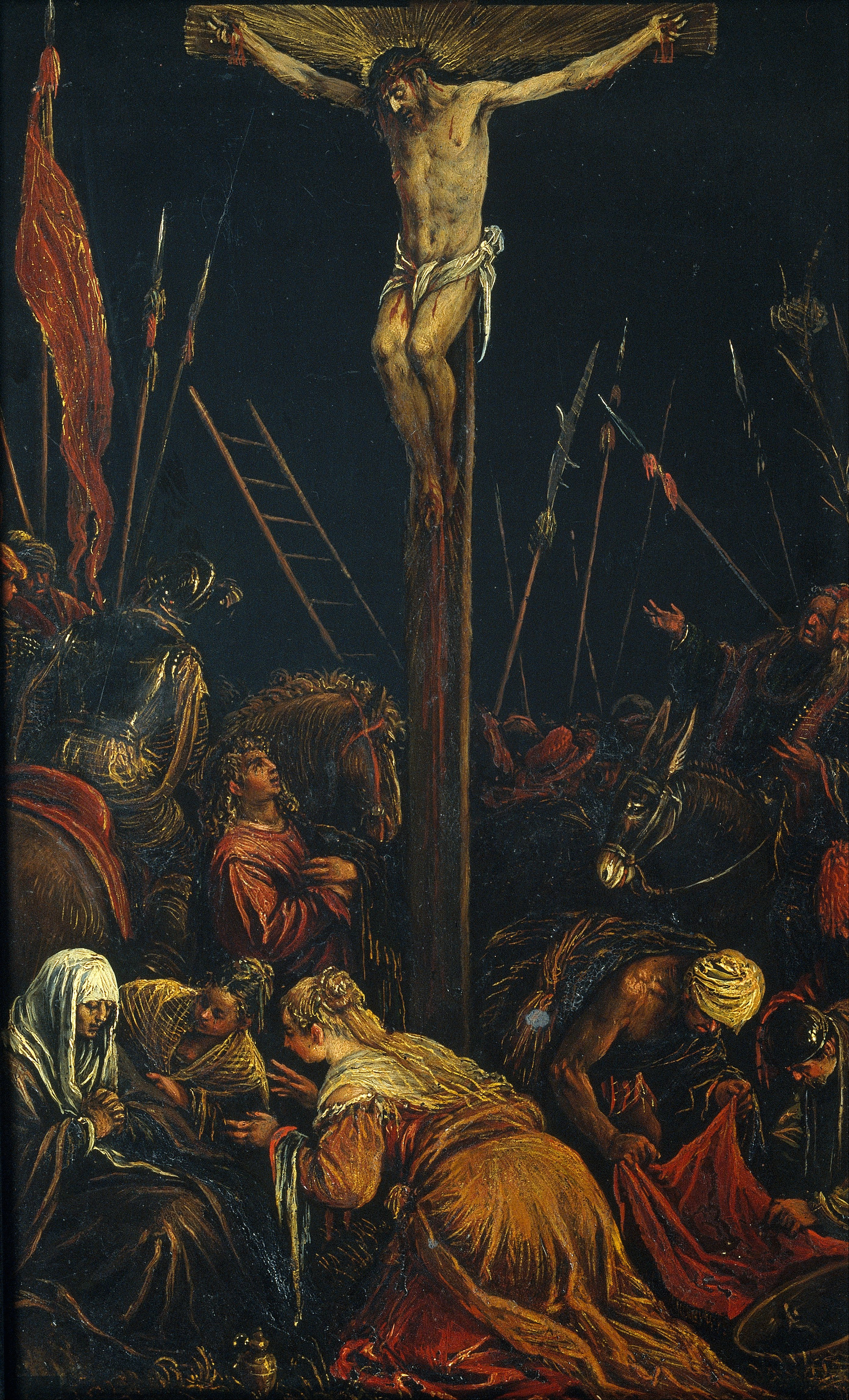
Calvary

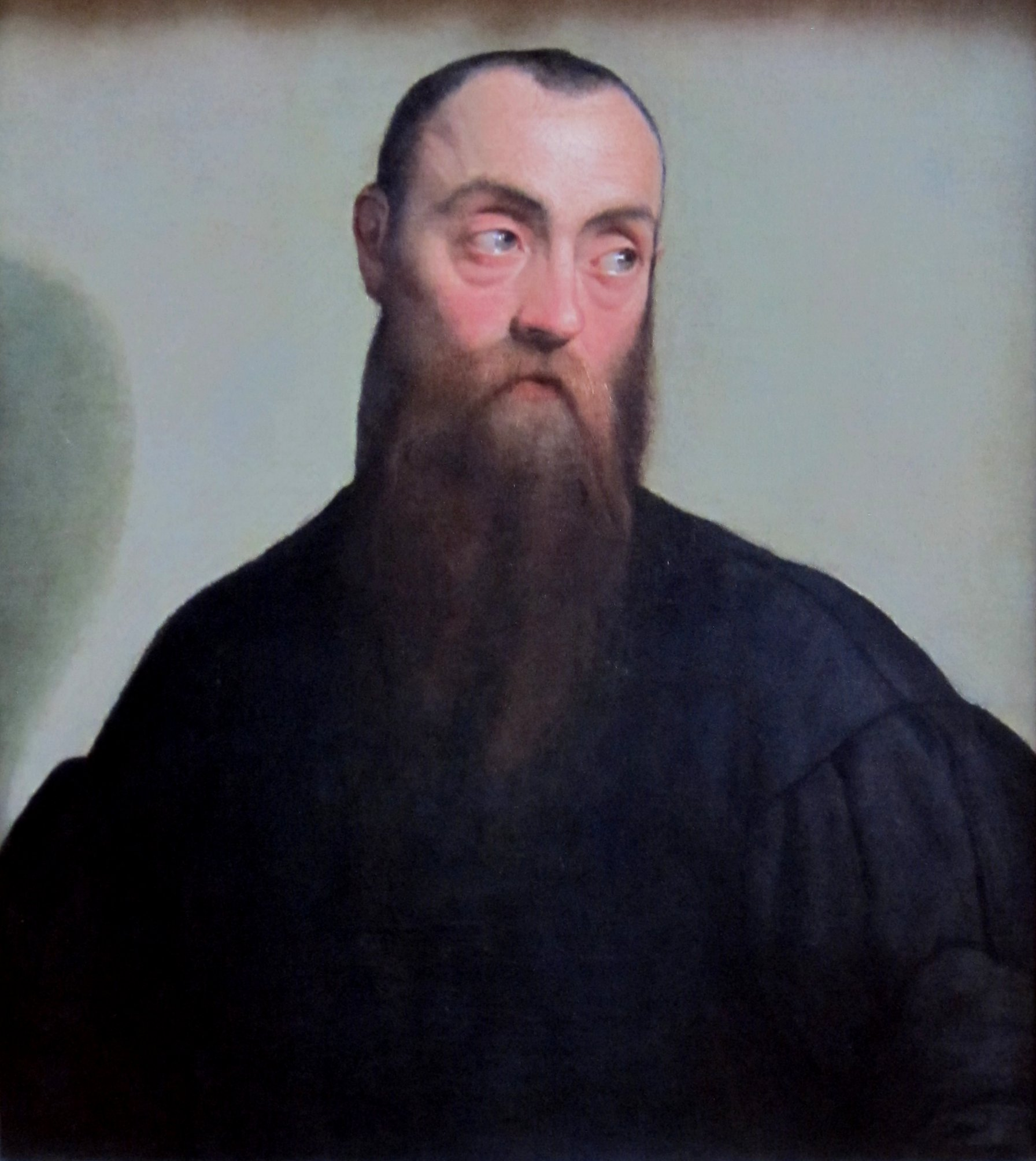
Portrait of a Bearded Man

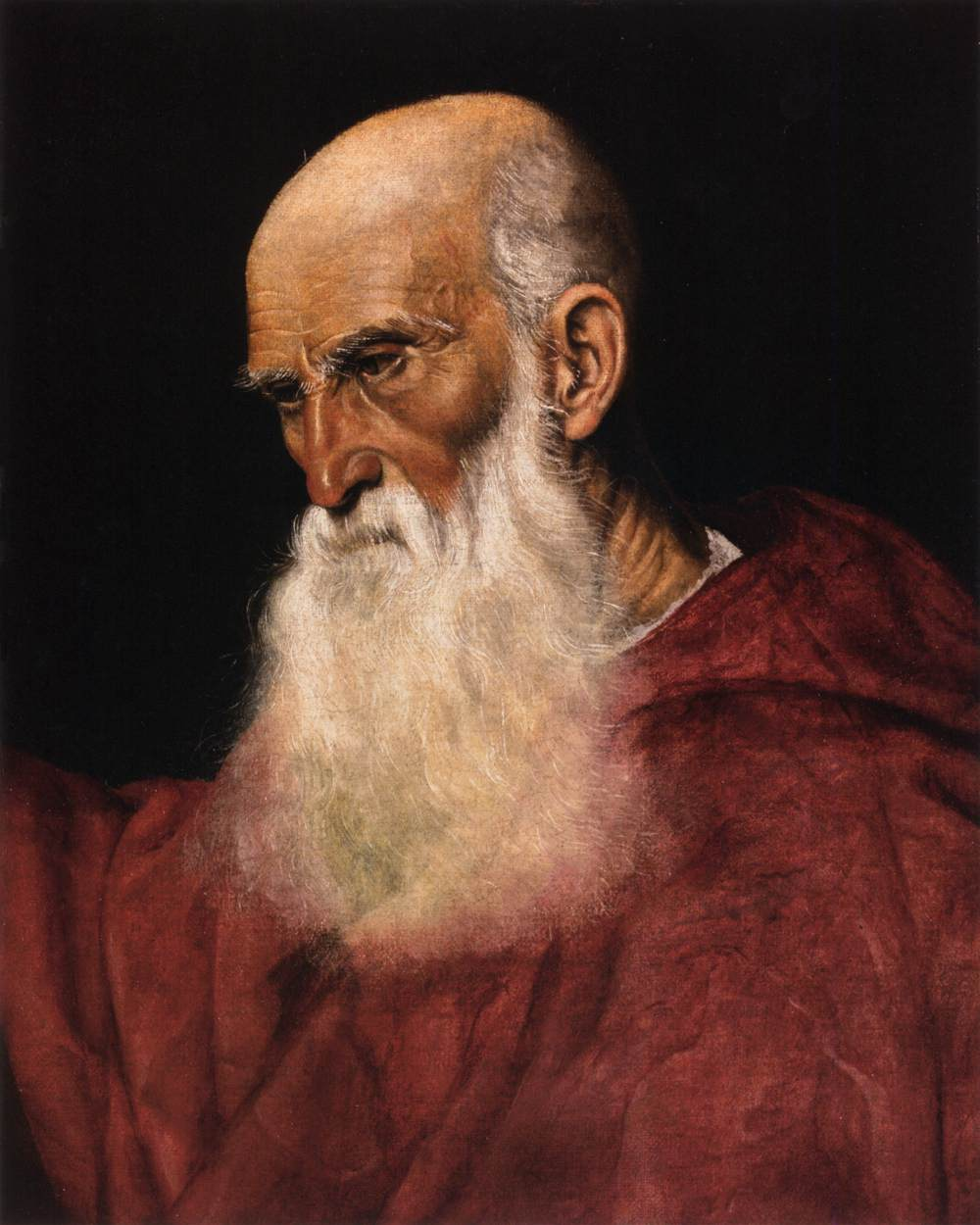
Portrait of a Cardinal

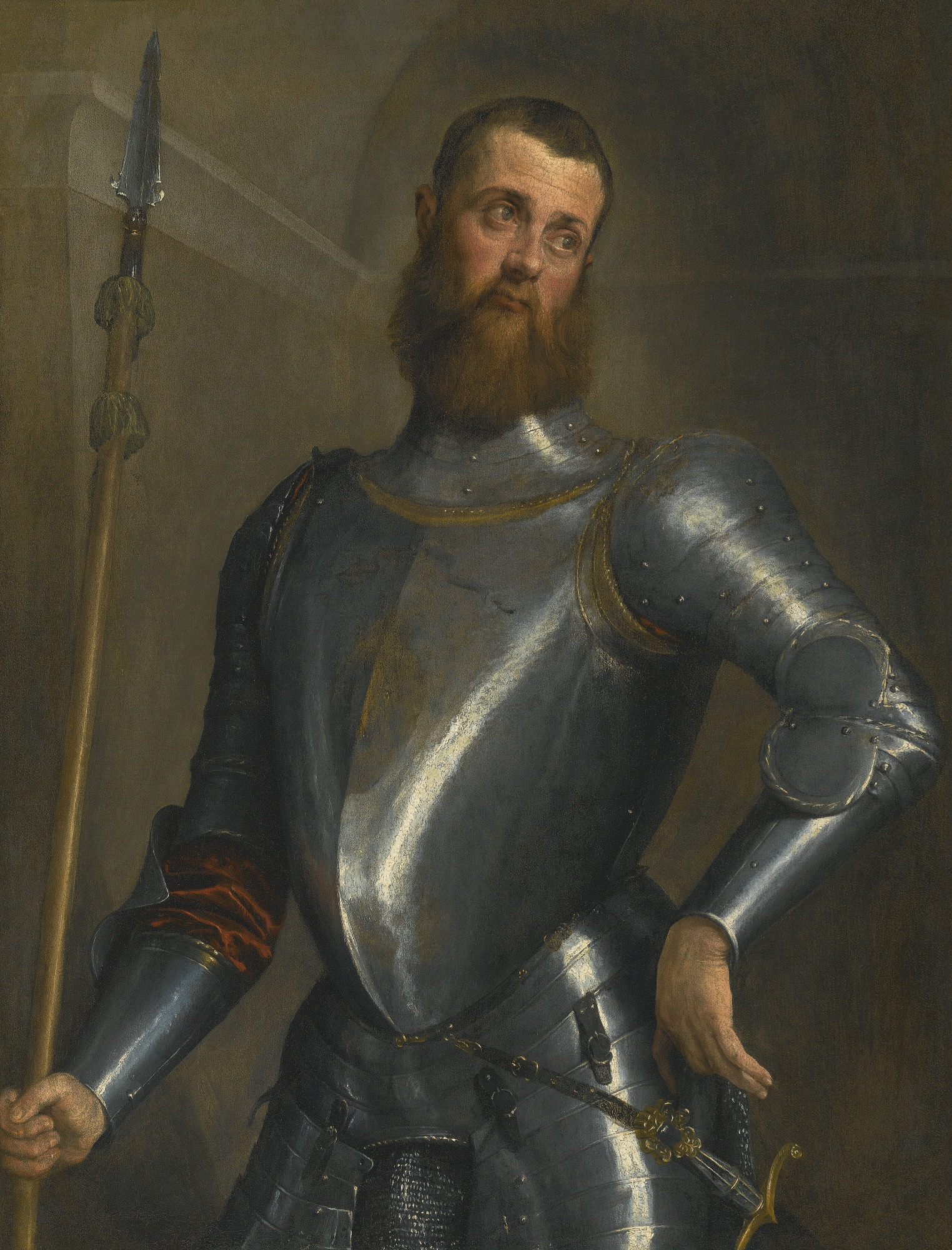
Portrait of a Gentleman

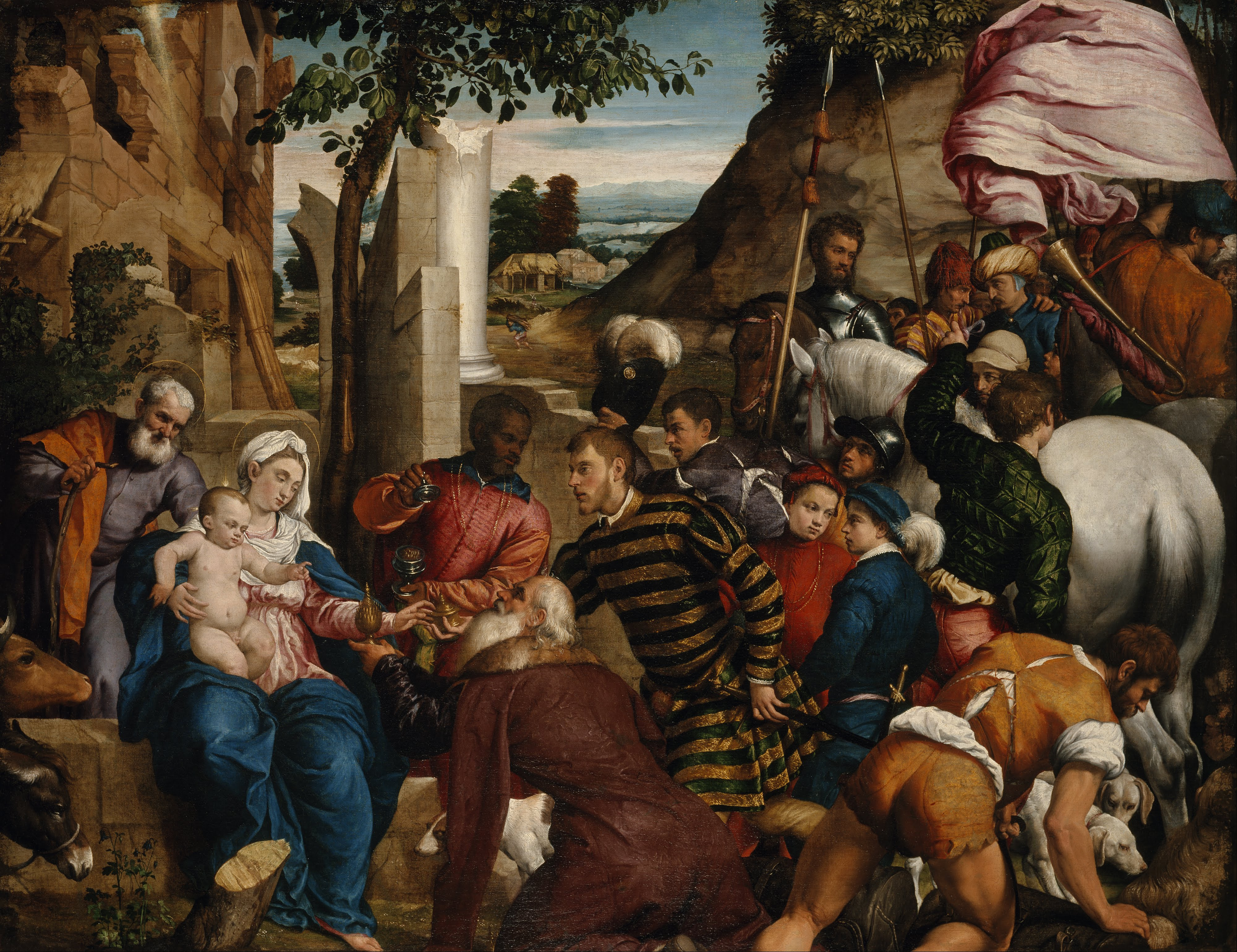
The Adoration of the Kings, early 1540s

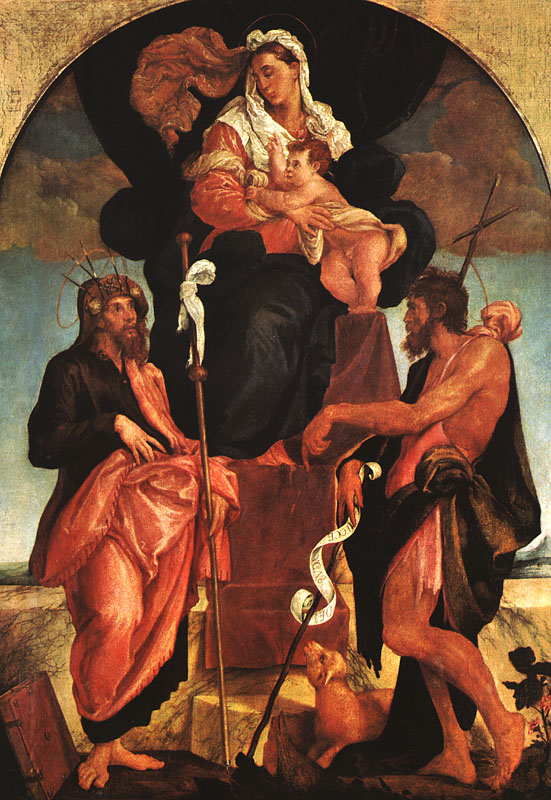
Altarpiece painted for the Church at Tomo, Pinakothek at Munich

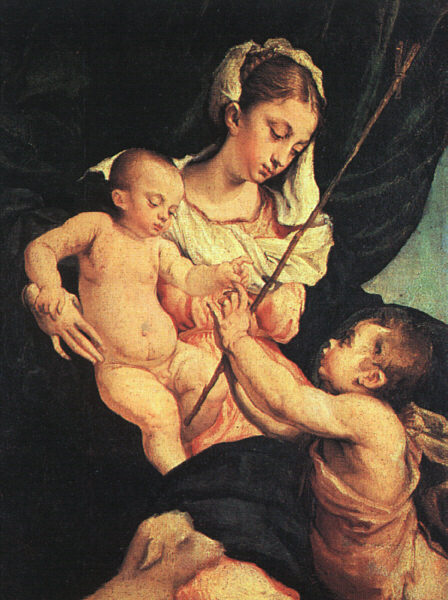
Madonna and Child with St John the Baptist (1570), Galleria degli Uffizi

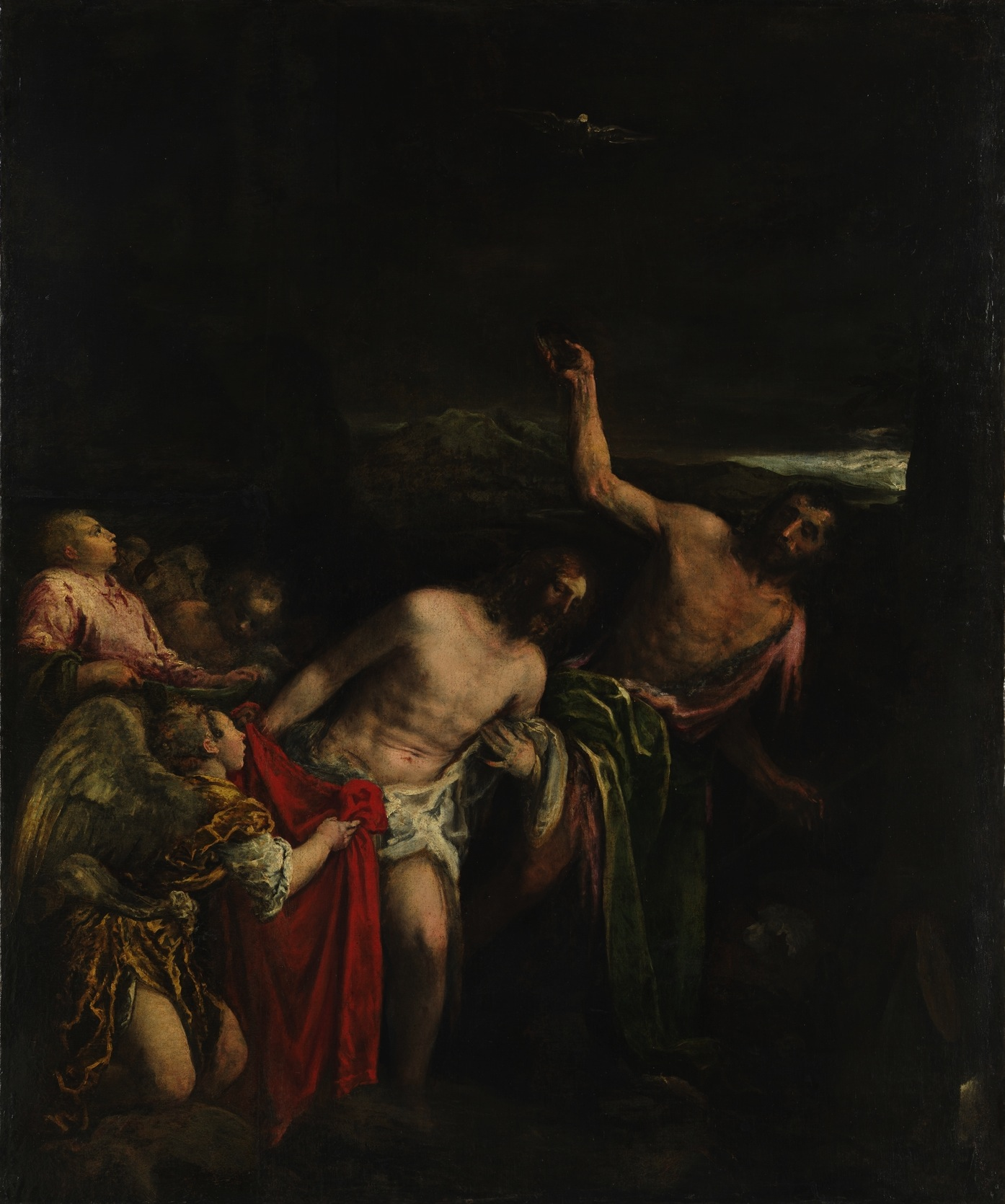
The Baptism of Christ, 1592, private collection

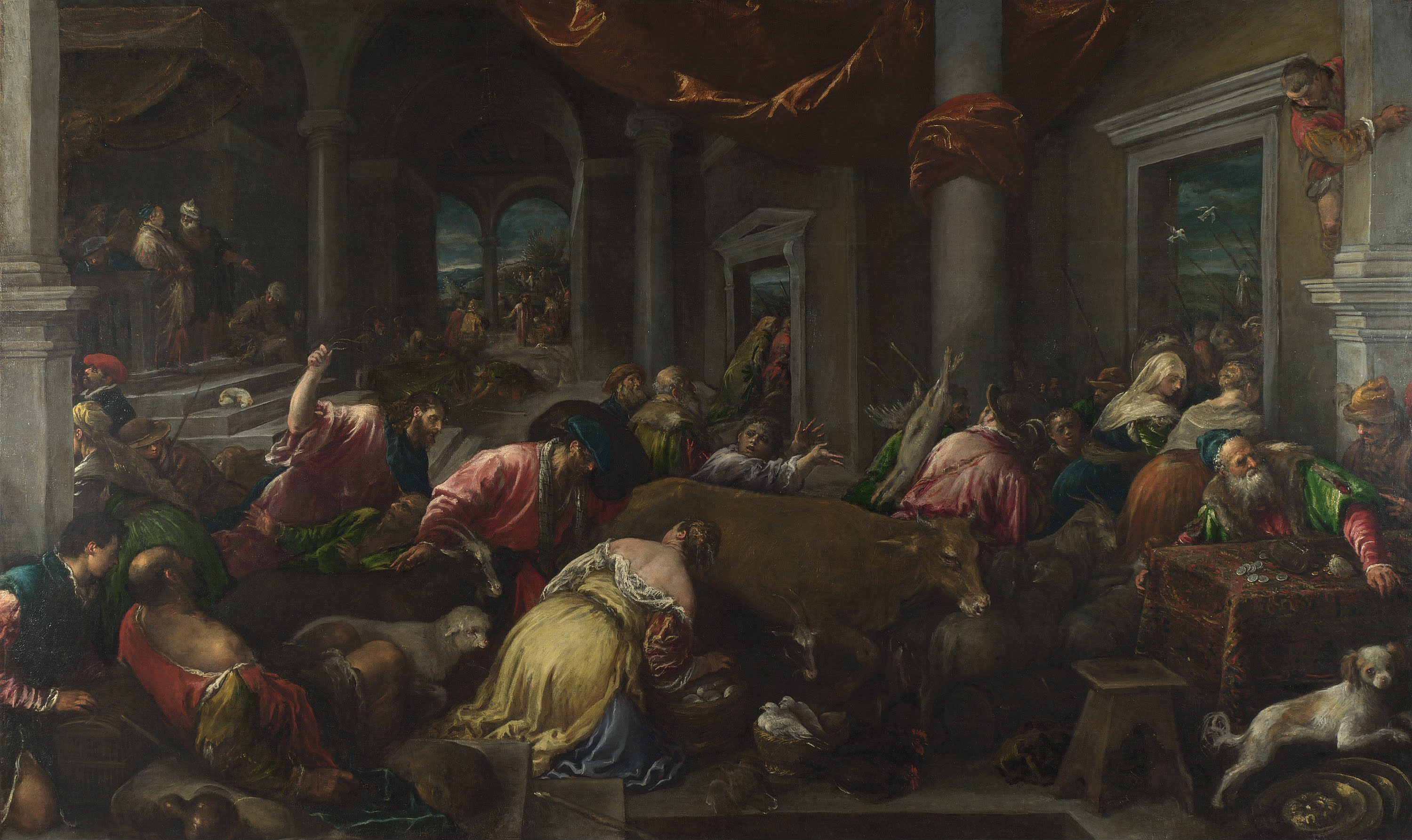
Jacopo Bassano and workshop - The Purification of the Temple

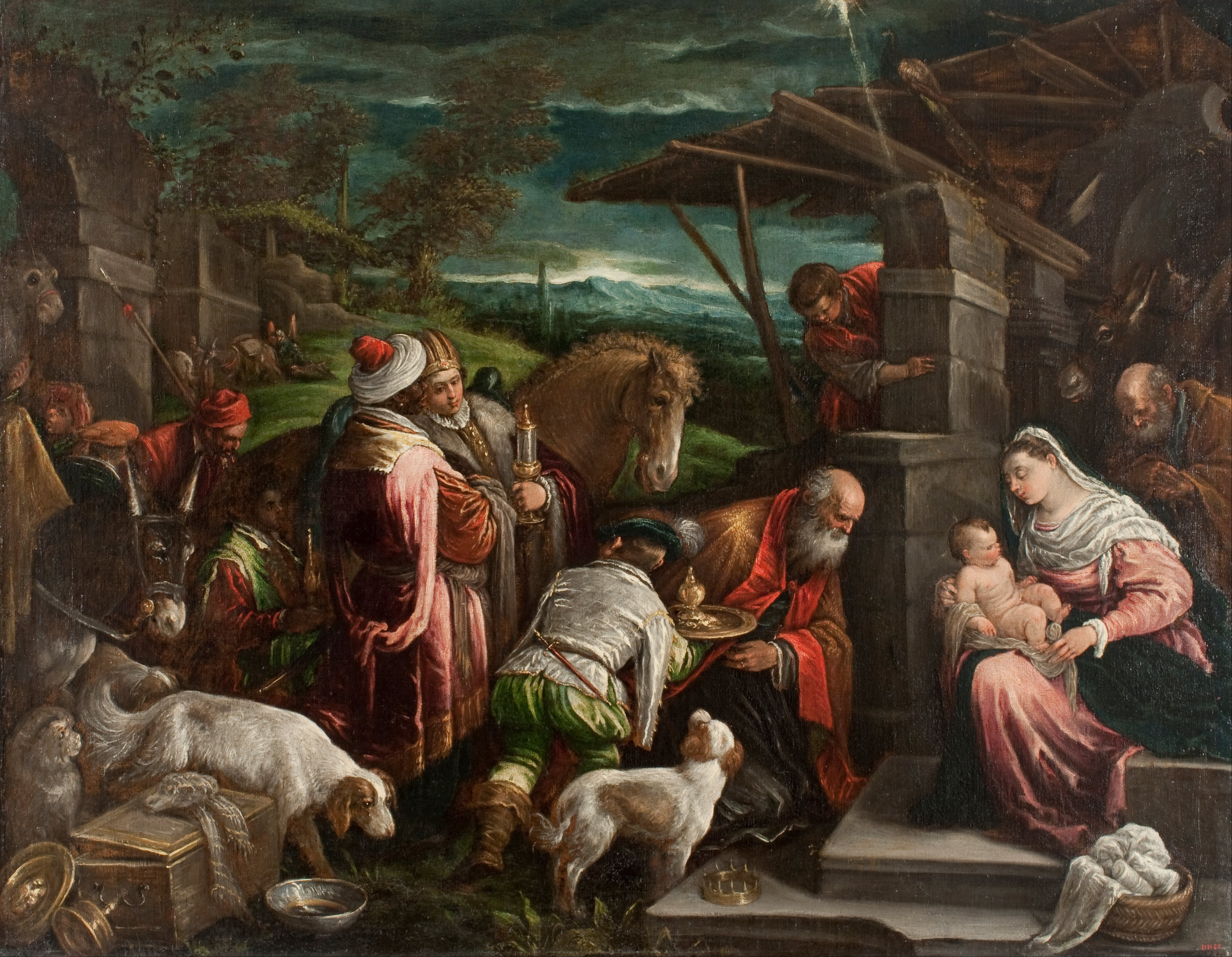
Adoration of the Magi

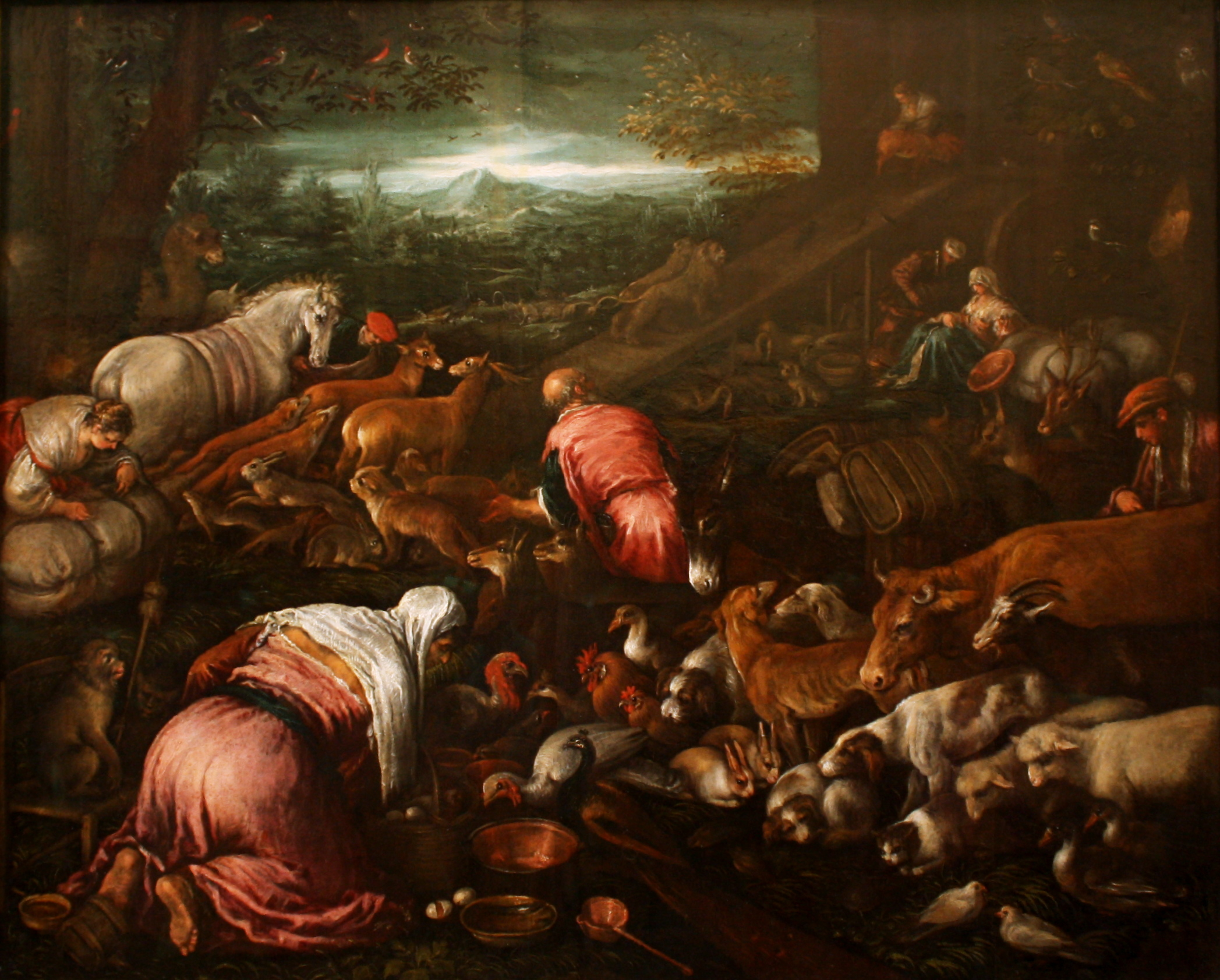
Animals boarding Noah's Ark

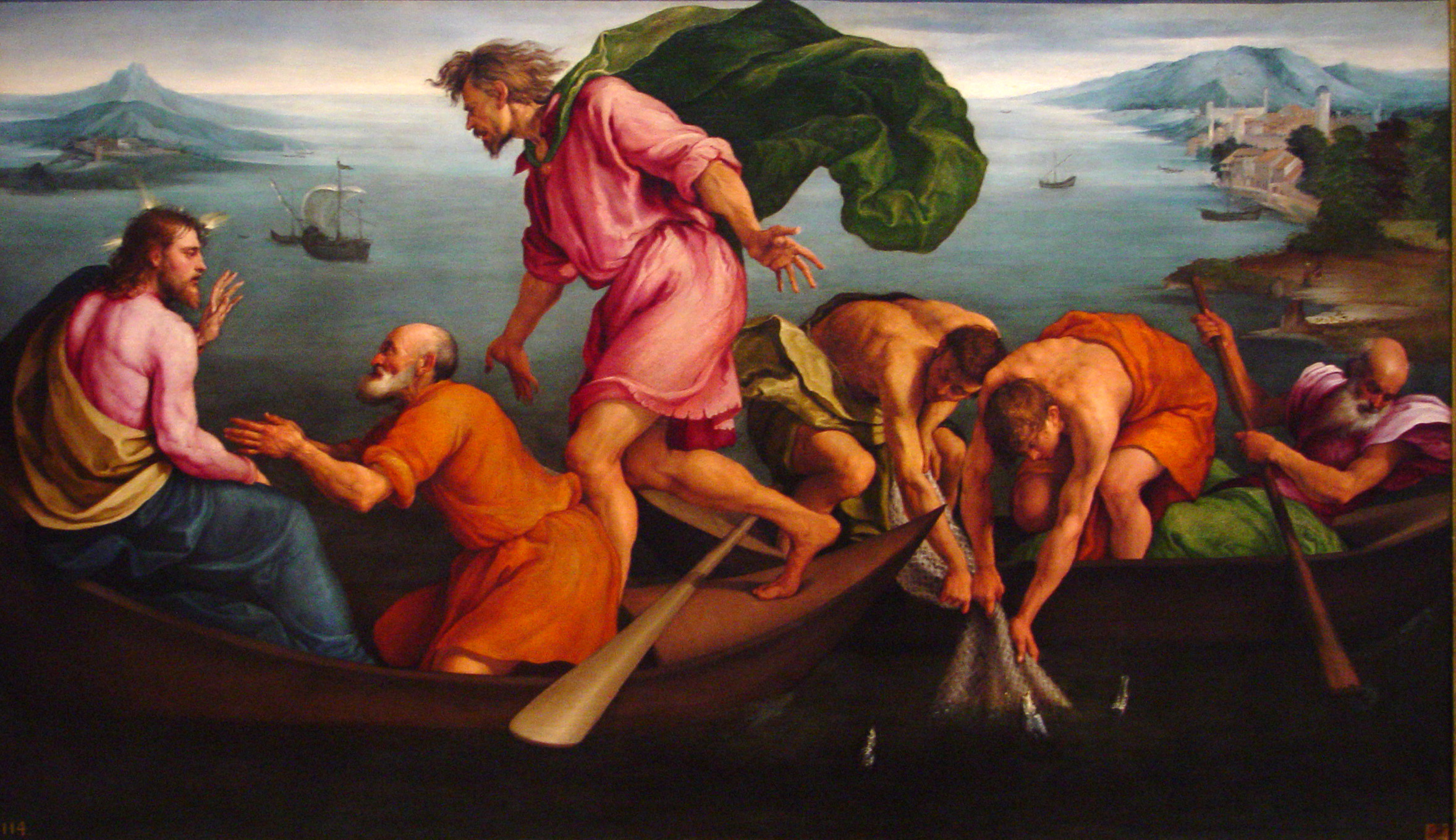
Miraculous Draught of Fishes

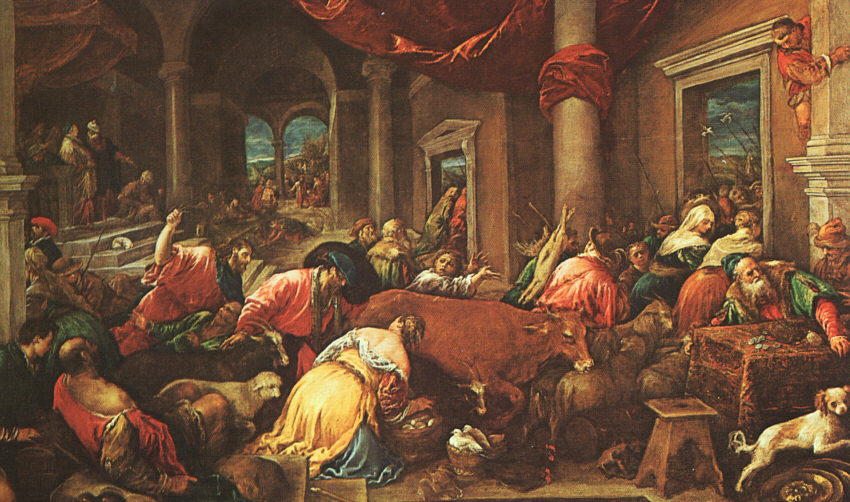
The Purification of the Temple, The National Gallery
