= Luigi Lippomano =

Italian bishop and hagiographer

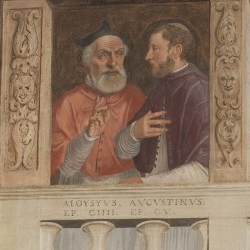
- Fresco showing the bishops of Verona Luigi (left) and Agostino (right) Lippomano.
- Diocese: Methone (1538); Verona (1548); Bergamo (1558)

Personal details
- Born: 1496
- Died: 15 August 1559 (aged 62–63)
- Parents: Bartolo Lippomano

Luigi Lippomano (also Alvise, or Aloisio, in Latin Aloisius Lipomanus) (1496, Venice – 15 August 1559, Rome) was an Italian bishop and hagiographer.

== Life ==
Luigi Lippomano was the illegitimate son of Venetian patrician Bartolo Lippomano, who determined to provide an ecclesiastical career for his son. He graduated from the university at Padua and eventually entered into service at the papal court in Rome. Distinguished for his piety and integrity of character, he was among the first in Rome to join the "Oratorio della Carità" founded by Cajetan of Tiene, and composed of distinguished men, who in the Roman Curia were the leaven of Church reform, and afterwards took a prominent part in the Council of Trent. In 1528 he accompanied the court of Pope Clement VII to Orvieto after the sack of Rome by imperial troops. Later that year he sent his brother Thomas a detailed firsthand report of the great flood of the Tiber.

In 1538, he was consecrated titular Bishop of Methone by Cardinal Gian Pietro Carafa, future Pope Paul IV, and appointed coadjutor cum jure successionis to his cousin Pietro Lippomano, Bishop of Bergamo, who was also active in Catholic reform. Due to his illegitimate birth and some say also opposition from German cardinals, Luigi would never become a cardinal. In 1542 Pope Paul III sent him as nuncio to Portugal to announce the convocation of the Council of Trent. He returned to Italy and took an active part in the council, following the council fathers to Bologna in 1547, where he attended all the sessions.

When Pietro was transferred to Verona in 1544, Luigi accompanied him. Pietro died in Edinburgh Castle during the summer of 1548 while on a diplomatic mission in Scotland, and Luigi succeeded him as Bishop of Verona.

In 1548 he was sent with Bertano and Pighi to Germany. From 1551 he was one of the presidents of the Council until its suspension (25 April 1552), during that period the dogmatic decrees on the Eucharist, penance, and extreme unction were published, as well as several decrees on reform.

In 1555 Pope Paul IV sent him as nuncio to Poland, where, on account of his lively opposition to the pretensions of the Protestant nobility, his reception was mixed. Tired and sick he returned to Verona in February 1557, and later, after recovery to Rome, where he stayed until his death on 15 August 1559.

== Works ==
Amid his numerous official duties, he did not neglect his studies, which, however, he directed towards spiritual edification. Thus he wrote "Catenae in Genesin" (Paris, 1546), "In Exodum" (Paris, 1550)—both works republished at Rome in 1557; Confirmatione et stabilimento di tutti i dogmi Catholici, con la subuersione di tutti i fondamenti, motiui & ragioni de i Moderni Eretici sino al numero (Venice, 1553). His chief work was Sanctorum priscorum patrum vitae (8 vols., Venice, 1551–60; 2 vols., Louvain 1564), for which he engaged the services of many learned men, and himself, on his travels, searched libraries and archives. This collection gave a great impulse to scientific hagiography, and opened the way for Surius and the Bollandists.

== External links and additional sources ==
- Cheney, David M. "Diocese of Verona". Catholic-Hierarchy.org. (for Chronology of Bishops) ^{[self-published]}
- Chow, Gabriel. "Diocese of Verona". GCatholic.org. (for Chronology of Bishops) ^{[self-published]}
- Cheney, David M. "Diocese of Bergamo". Catholic-Hierarchy.org. (for Chronology of Bishops) ^{[self-published]}
- Chow, Gabriel. "Diocese of Bergamo (Italy)". GCatholic.org. (for Chronology of Bishops) ^{[self-published]}
- Cheney, David M. "Nunciature to Poland". Catholic-Hierarchy.org. (for Chronology of Bishops) ^{[self-published]}
- Chow, Gabriel. "Apostolic Nunciature Poland". GCatholic.org. (for Chronology of Bishops) ^{[self-published]}

=== Notes ===
- Marco Foscarini, Della letteratura veneta (Venice, 1854)
- Ferdinando Ughelli, Italia sacra, IV (2nd ed.) 497-9
- Streber in Kirchenlexikon, s. v.
- Diaria Conc. Trid., I-II (Freiburg, 1901-4), passim.
- Lorenzo Tacchella, Il Processo agli eretici veronesi nel 1550: S. Ignazio di Loyola e Luigi Lippomano (Verona, 1979)
- Henryk Damian Wojtyska, Acta Nuntiaturae Polonae: Aloisius Lippomano 1555-1557 (Rome, 1993)
- Magda Teter, Sinners on Trial (Cambridge, Mass, 2011), chapter 5

Catholic Church titles
Preceded by	Titular Bishop of Methone; 1538–1548	Succeeded by Georges Albinus
Preceded by Pietro Lippomano	Bishop of Verona; 1548–1558	Succeeded by Agostino Lippomano
Preceded by Vittore Soranzo	Bishop of Bergamo; 1558–1559	Succeeded by Luigi Cornaro (cardinal)
