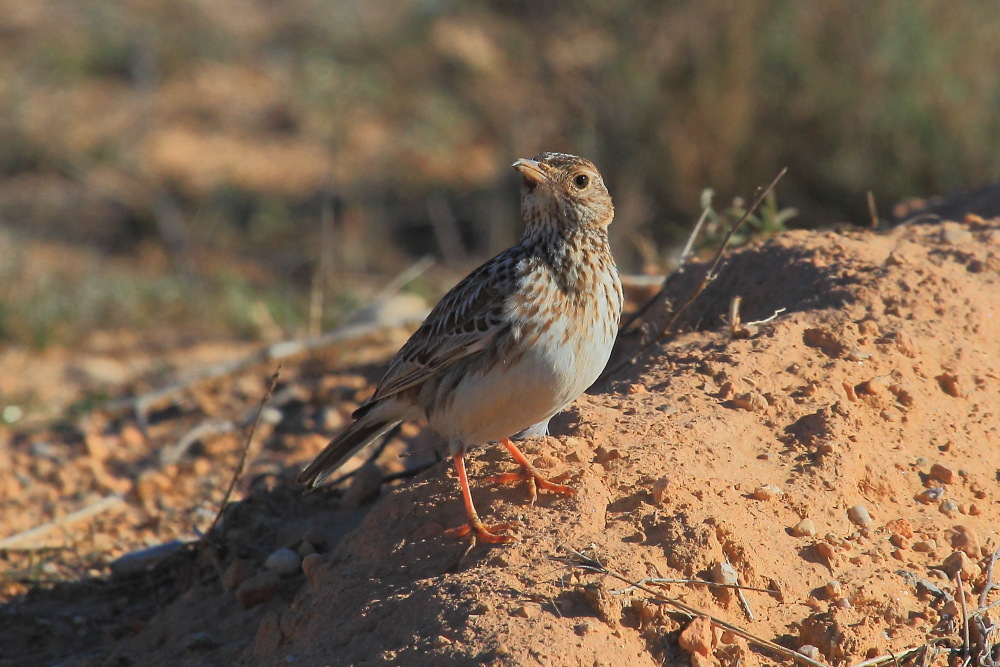
- in Lleida, Spain

Conservation status
- Vulnerable (IUCN 3.1)

Scientific classification
- Kingdom: Animalia
- Phylum: Chordata
- Class: Aves
- Order: Passeriformes
- Family: Alaudidae
- Genus: Chersophilus; Sharpe, 1890
- Species: C. duponti

Binomial name
- Chersophilus duponti (Vieillot, 1824)
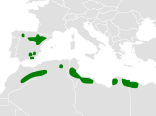

Synonyms
- Alauda Duponti

= Dupont's lark =

Species of bird

Dupont's lark (Chersophilus duponti) is a species of lark in the family Alaudidae of the monotypic genus Chersophilus. It is found in northern Africa and Spain.

== Taxonomy and systematics ==
Dupont's lark was originally described by Louis Pierre Vieillot in 1820 and placed in the genus Alauda. It was named for the French naturalist Léonard Puech Dupont, who had collected the species and showed it to Vieillot.

=== Subspecies ===
Two subspecies are recognized:

- North-western Dupont's lark (C. d. duponti) - (Vieillot, 1824): Found in southern Spain, northern Morocco, northern Algeria and northern Tunisia
- South-eastern Dupont's lark (C. d. margaritae) - (Koenig, AF, 1888): Originally described as a separate species in the genus Alaemon. Found from central Algeria to western Egypt

== Description ==
Like most other larks, Dupont's lark is an undistinguished looking species on the ground. It is 17–18 cm long, slim, with a long neck, long legs and a fine slightly curved bill. It has a thin pale crown stripe and a dark-streaked breast. The north-western Dupont's lark of Europe and north-west Africa is mainly brown-grey above and pale below. The south-eastern Dupont's lark, which occupies most of the rest of the African range, has rufous upperparts.

=== Vocalisations ===
Its song is a repeated thin, melancholic whistling phrase, very ventriloquial (difficult to locate) and a nasal whistle given mainly at dawn and dusk or at night.

== Distribution and habitat ==
It breeds across much of northern Africa, from Algeria to Egypt, and in Spain. It is a non-migratory resident. It is a species that commonly inhabits chaparral areas. However, it experienced a 3.9% annual population decrease in Spain with a 32.8% decrease from 2008 to 2018, shifting its conservation status to vulnerable on the national level and endangered in the regions of Andalusia and Castile-León.

== Behaviour and ecology ==
This is a very shy species, which runs for cover when disturbed. It is difficult to see while running among vegetation but it sometimes sings, standing upright on the edge of a low bush.

=== Breeding ===
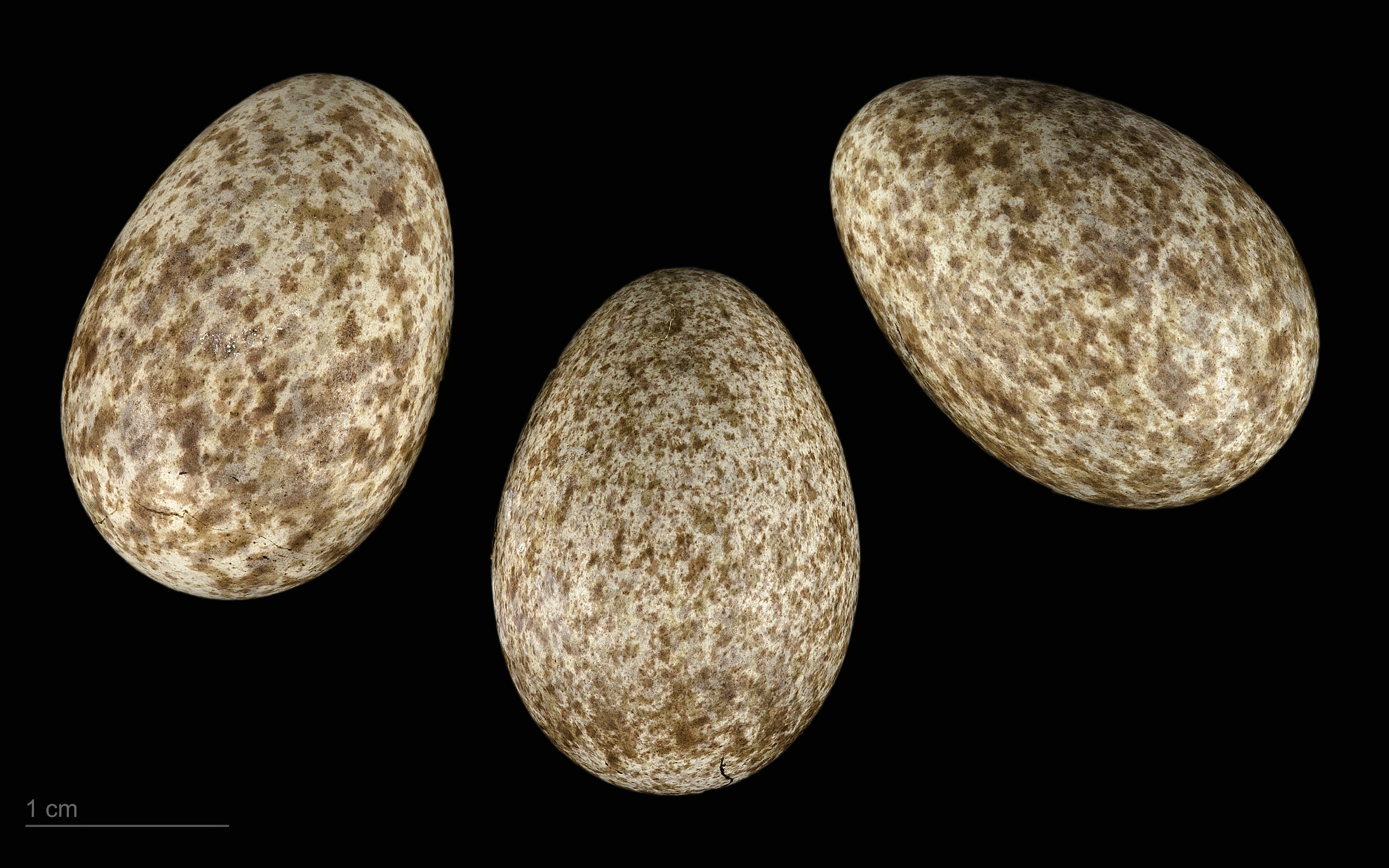
Chersophilus duponti duponti - MHNT

This is a bird of open sandy semi-desert or steppe with some grass. Its nest is on the ground, with three or four eggs being laid. Its food is seeds and insects.
