= Ponte (surname) =

Ponte is a topographic surname which is of Portuguese, Galician, Italian and Jewish origin. It may refer to "a dweller by a bridge". Its alternative meaning is derived from the Anglo-Norman French word pont which, in turn, originates from the Latin word pons with the meaning of "a bridge".

Notable people with the surname include:

- Angelo Ponte (1925–2018), American mobster
- Gabry Ponte (born 1973), Italian DJ and record producer
- José Linhares Ponte (1930–2025), Brazilian politician
- Laura Ponte (born 1973), Spanish model
- Mateo Ponte (born 2003), Uruguayan football player
- Moshe Ponte (born 1956), Israeli Olympic judoka
- Robson Ponte (born 1976), Brazilian football player
- Vincent Ponte (1919–2006), Canadian urban planner

== See also ==
- De Ponte
- Da Ponte
- Del Ponte, list of people with a similar surname
