= United Air Lines Flight 823 =

1964 aviation accident

United Airlines Flight 823
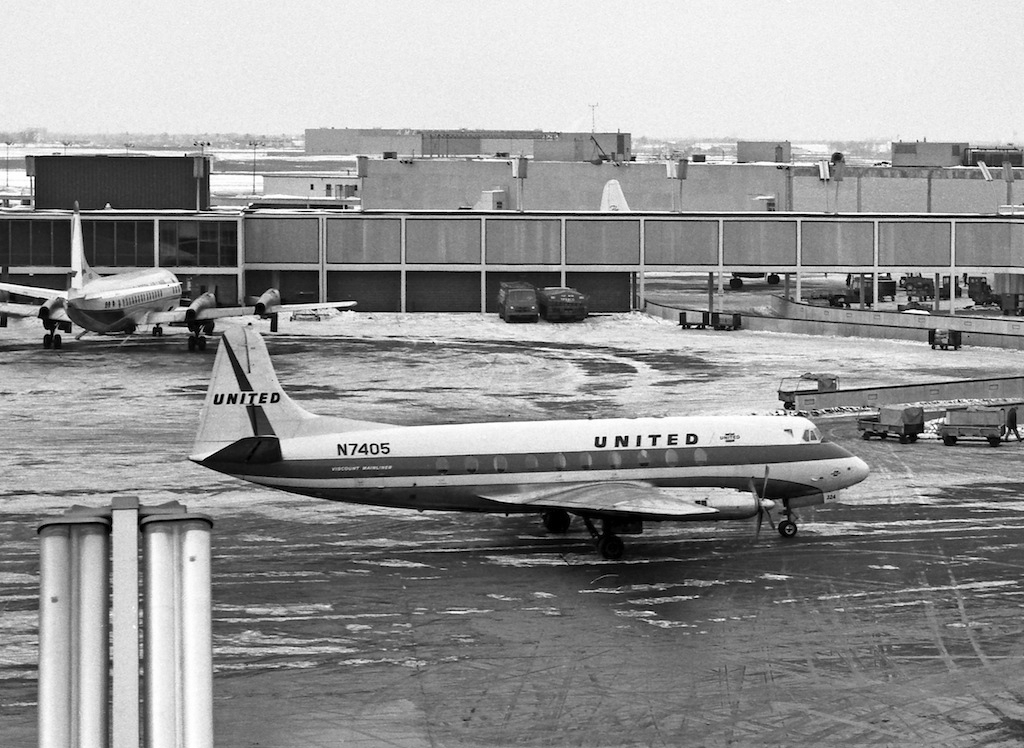
- N7405, the aircraft involved, at Chicago O'Hare International Airport in 1963

Accident
- Date: July 9, 1964
- Summary: In-flight fire for reasons unknown, loss of control
- Site: Cocke County, near Parrottsville, Tennessee, United States; 36°1′36.51″N 83°3′41.19″W

Aircraft
- Aircraft type: Vickers Viscount 745D
- Operator: United Airlines
- Call sign: UNITED 823
- Registration: N7405
- Flight origin: Philadelphia International Airport
- Stopover: Washington-National Airport
- Last stopover: Knoxville-McGhee Tyson Airport
- Destination: Huntsville International Airport
- Occupants: 39
- Passengers: 35
- Crew: 4
- Fatalities: 39
- Survivors: 0

United Airlines Flight 823 was a scheduled flight from Philadelphia International Airport, Pennsylvania, to Huntsville International Airport, Alabama, with 39 on board. On July 9, 1964, around 18:15 EST, the aircraft, a Vickers Viscount, registration N7405, crashed 2.25 mi (3.62 km) northeast of Parrottsville, Tennessee, after experiencing an uncontrollable fire on board, killing all 39 on board. The fire of unknown origin occurred in the passenger cabin. One passenger abandoned the aircraft through the No.4 escape window prior to impact, but did not survive the free-fall. Among the victims was Durant da Ponte, professor of American literature and assistant dean of the University of Tennessee graduate school.

The Aircraft Accident Report published by the Civil Aeronautics Board in June 1966—almost two years after the crash—stated, "The Board is unable to identify the source of fuel, the ignition point of the fire, or the cause of the final maneuver." The investigation found the probable cause was "an uncontrollable in-flight fire, of undetermined origin, in the fuselage, which resulted in a loss of control of the aircraft."

About 33,000 pounds (15,000 kg) of the 40,000-pound (18,100 kg) (empty weight) airliner were recovered, with much of the missing weight attributable to cabin furnishings that were destroyed by fire. The wreckage was transported to the Naval Laboratory in Washington, DC, where the Vickers was reconstructed by the Civil Aeronautics Board.

The accident triggered an investigation of the Lockheed L-109C flight data recorder, which resulted in modifications of that device and revision of the standards for all recorders. Also addressed were potential problems with the Pyrene Duo Head Model DCD-10 fire-extinguisher system for the underfloor baggage and heater compartments. An Airworthiness Directive was issued. Revisions were made to the Pilot's Manual, Viscount Maintenance and Instruction, and Accessories Manuals.

The accident happened next to a farm owned by the family of Miss Mae Trentham, whose family helped the crash's rescue workers with water and food. The airplane had grazed the Trentham property before it crashed; the property became the unofficial headquarters of both rescuers and investigators.
