= Girolamo da Ponte =

Italian painter (1566–1621)

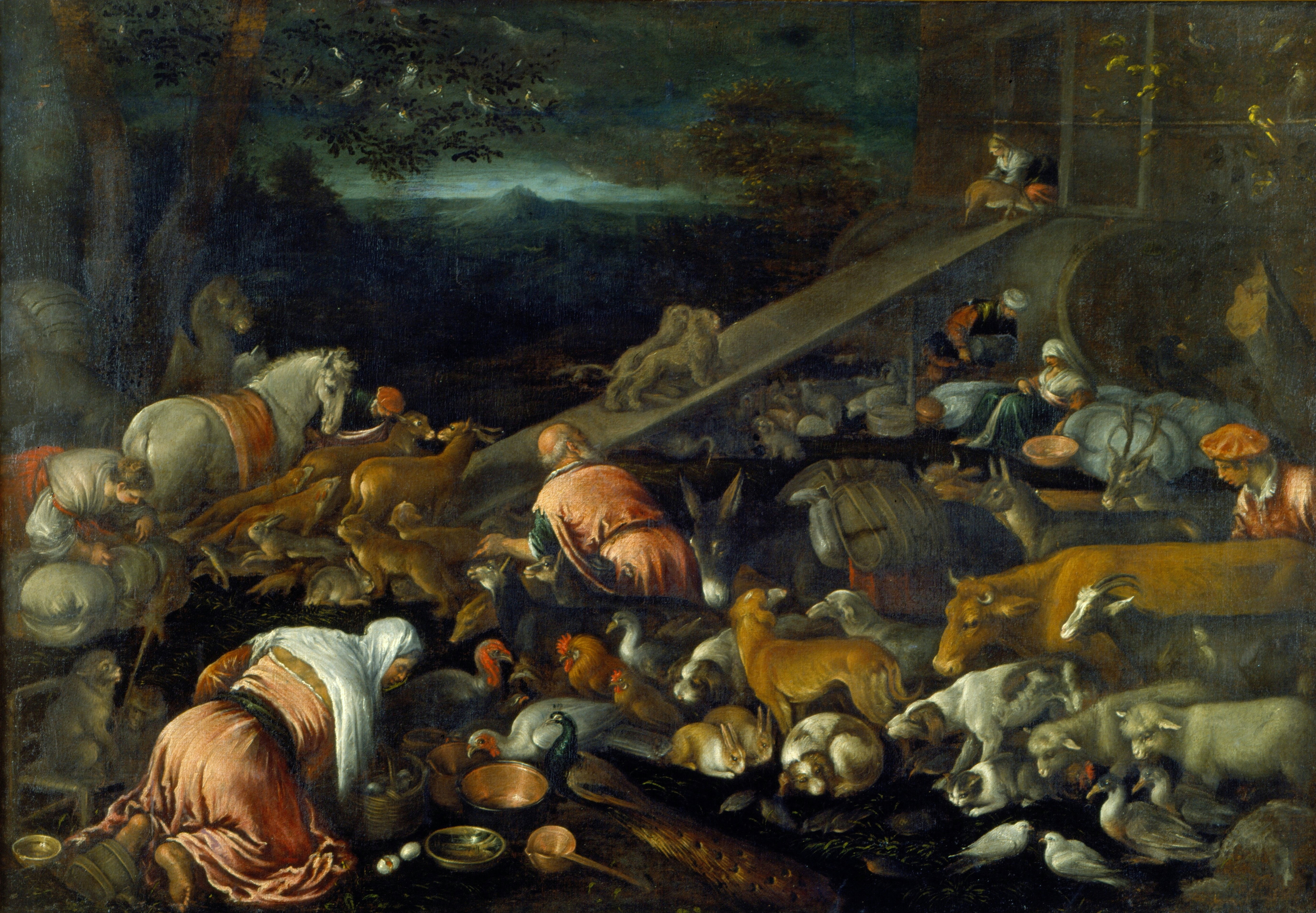
The Entry of Animals into Noah's Ark by Geralamo Bassano

Girolamo da Ponte also known as Gerolamo Bassano (3 June 1566 in Bassano del Grappa – 8 November 1621 in Venice) was an Italian painter of the Renaissance period.

The youngest son of painter Jacopo da Bassano, he also copied his father's pictures, and like his brother Giambattista, must take his share in the prolific number of canvases attributed to Jacopo Bassano. He painted an Apparition of the Virgin to St. Barbara in Bassano. He also collaborated with his brother Leandro Bassano, including portraits of Sagredo.
