= De Ponte =

De Ponte is a topographic byname/surname literally meaning "from the bridge". Notable people with the name include:

- Carla Del Ponte
- Giovanni De Ponte
- Guigo de Ponte
- John de Ponte or John de Ponz
- Juan de Ponte
- Oldradus de Ponte
- Onofrio de Ponte
- Pedro de Ponte
- Piero de Ponte

== See also ==
- Dupont (surname)
- da Ponte
- Ponte (surname)
- Luis de la Puente
