= Henry Dupont =

French naturalist (1798–1873)

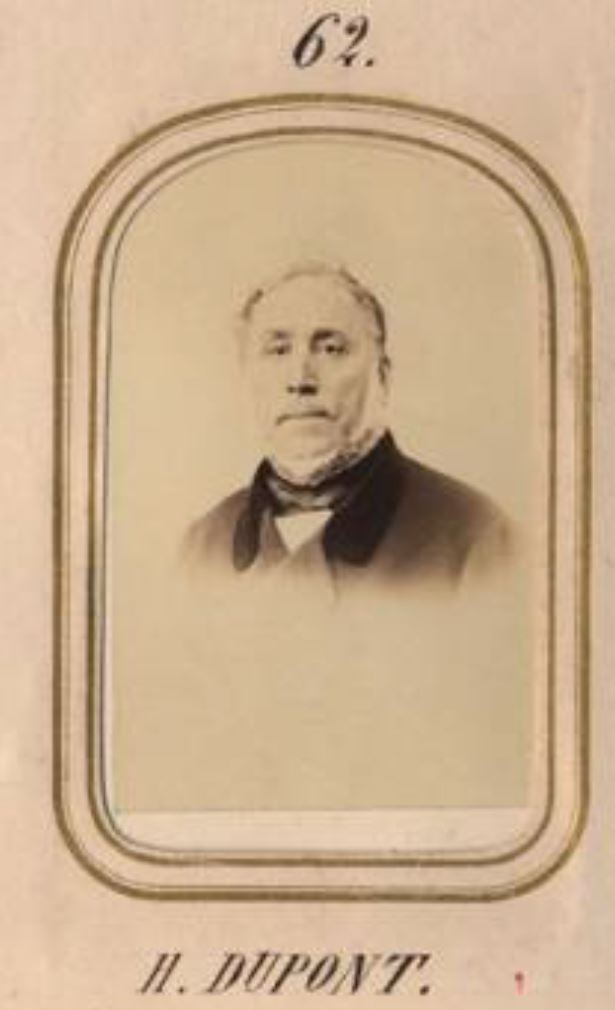
Portrait

Richard Henry Puech Dupont or Henry Dupont (1 November 1798 – 2 July 1873) was a French naturalist and a collector and trader in specimens of beetles and birds. He was the younger brother of the naturalist Leonard Dupont and many references in old French works merely mention Monsieur Dupont which has led to confusion between the two although in some works Leonard is referred to as the senior Dupont senior (aîné) and Henry as the younger (jeune). For the larger part Henry was into beetles and entomology while Leonard was more associated with birds. Many species of beetle were named by Henry Dupont and some are named after him by others.

Henry or Henri was born at Bayeux on 1 November 1798 (Leonard on 10 January 1796) to wig-maker Jean-Antoine Puech dit Dupont and his wife Marie-Francoise Badin. They were baptized with the surname Puech dit Dupont but in later life they were known only as Dupont. Both the boys (a third died young) were interested in natural history and their mother was a conchologist of some repute. The malacologist L.C. Kiener named Conus dupontii from a specimen in her collections as did Leon de Joannis in Cyrenoida dupontia. She is also mentioned in Boitard and Canivet's manual Manuel du naturaliste preparateur (1828) where she is credited for a method of compact arrangement of butterfly specimens for transport. Henry studied at Paris and worked at the Jardin des Plantes before becoming a dealer in specimens of natural history for nearly thirty years. He ran his enterprise from Quai Saint-Michel and sold insect specimens as well as wax-models of species for entomogists. He bought from other collectors and supplied them to others including Dejean who named several species after Dupont including Cicindela duponti (Dejean, 1826) although some specimens such as from Tripoli were obtained from older brother Leonard who travelled briefly in Africa.

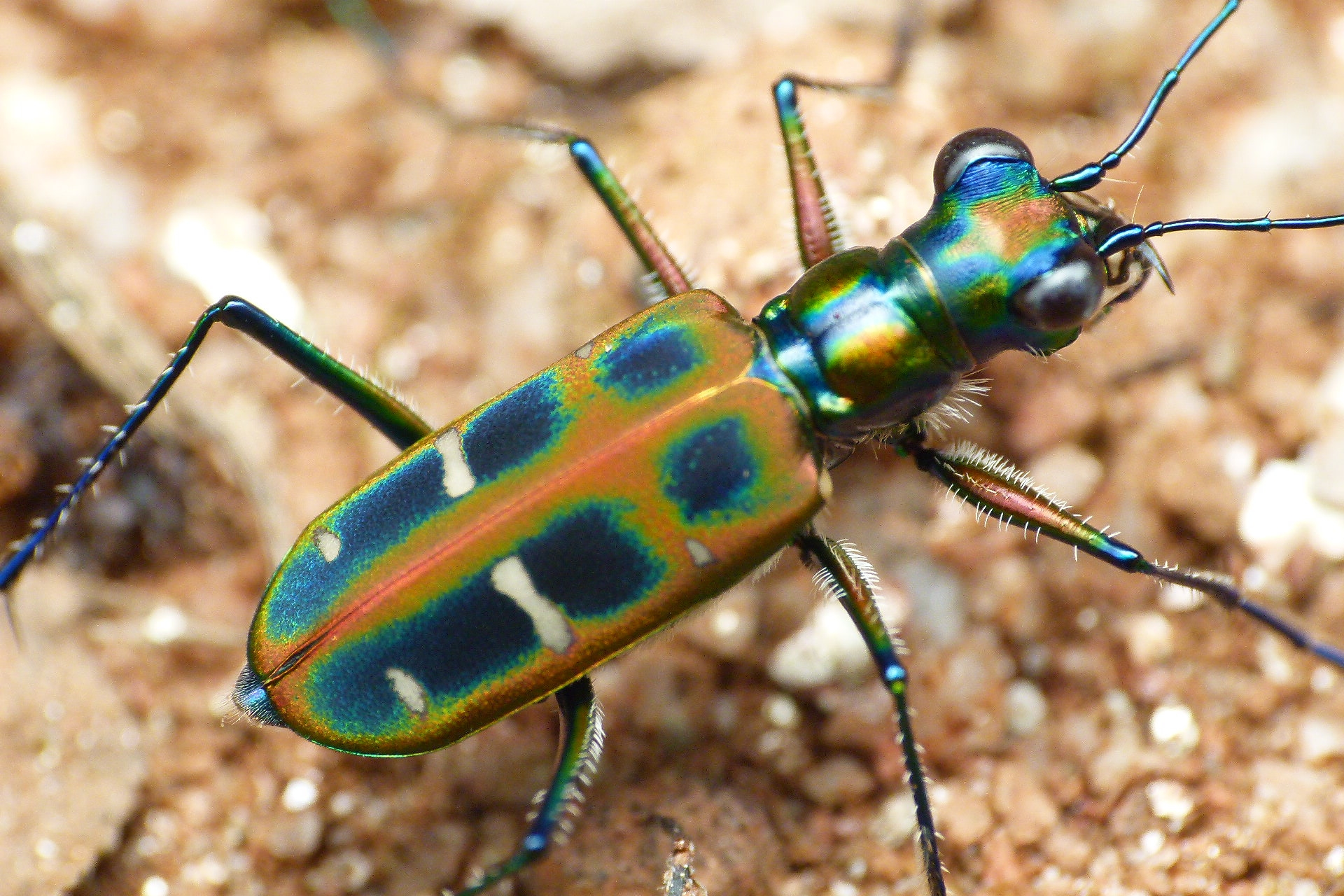
Cicindela duponti

Henry became a prolific collector with nearly 10000 specimens in 1828 with an additional 15000 specimens from Madagascar from Jules Goudot. He became a member of the Societe Entomologique de France in 1832 and wrote many papers on new specimens. Around 1846 he retired from the business and began to dispose his collections with 23000 going to a Polish Count Jerzy Wandalin Mniszech (1822–1881) and another sent to Odessa with the help of writer Honore de Balzac. In 1849 he resigned from the entomological society of France. With the outbreak of the Franco-Prussian War, he fled his home in Bellevue and moved to central Paris and was only rarely seen at the Museum National d’Histoire Naturelle. After the war he returned to his much damaged home and died there about two years later on 2 July 1873.

He was married to Rose Marguerite Julie Baudry from 1823 and had at least two children who survived him. The son Francois Henri transferred about 350 bird sternums to the natural history museum in Paris and some of his specimens came back to the museum through the collections of Oberthur.
