= Leonard Dupont =

French naturalist (1796–1828)

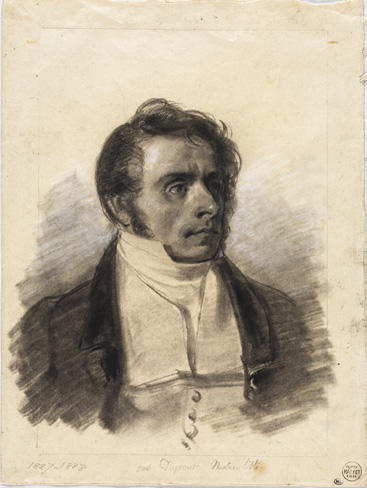

Léonard Puech Dupont (10 January 1796 – 7 February 1828) was a French naturalist, explorer, collector and trader of natural history specimens.

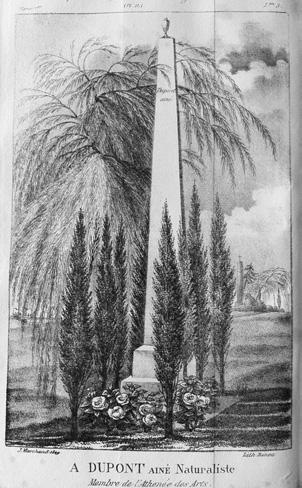
Memorial to Dupont, location unknown

Dupont was born in Bayeux, Normandy to wigmaker Jean-Antoine Puech dit Dupont and Marie-Françoise Badin. An older sibling died at the age of three and his younger brother Richard Henry or Henri (known also as Dupont jeune) also became a naturalist. Their mother was a conchologist with a large collection of shells. The family moved to Paris and Leonard began to collect specimens and was a regular at the Jardin des Plantes, interacting with other naturalists. and working for sometime as a specimen preparator. In 1818 he was hired by Joseph Ritchie for an expedition into Africa along the Niger river. Ritchie and Dupont were also joined by George Francis Lyon (1795–1832) and John Belford. Dupont resigned from the group at Tripoli on 7 February 1819. The group had to disguise themselves as Muslims and Leonard took the name of Mourad but refused to be circumcised and fell afoul of Ritchie. This left Leonard stranded without money and he had to be repatriated by the French consul. Returning to France with a large set of specimens which were sold to naturalists resulted in several new species being described including Dupont's lark Chersophilus duponti.

Dupont published Traite ́de taxidermie, ou l’art de conserver et d’empailler les animaux (1823) which was reviewed by Vieillot. He died in 1828 and an unlocated grave monument was described by Caplin.

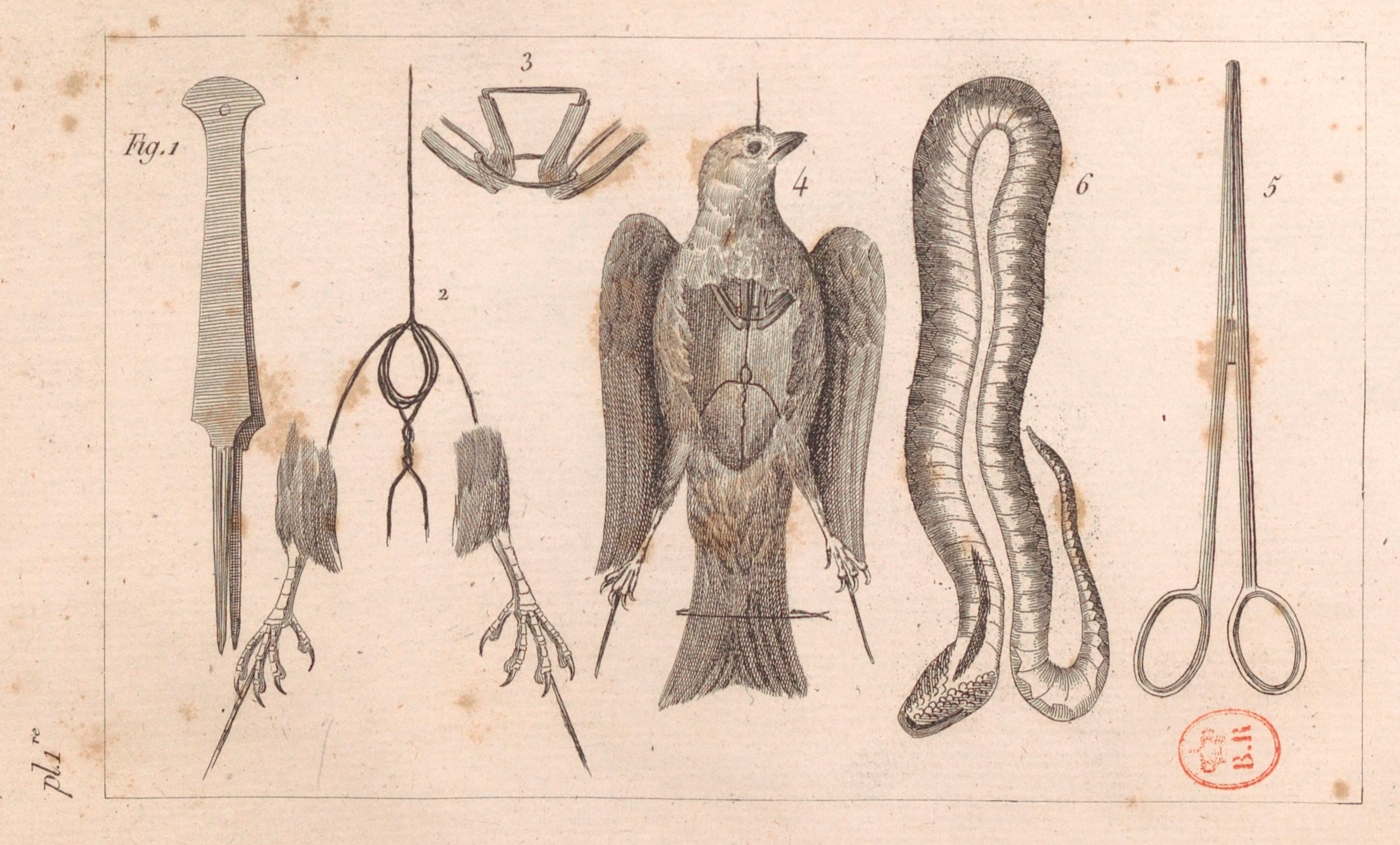
Preparation of specimens

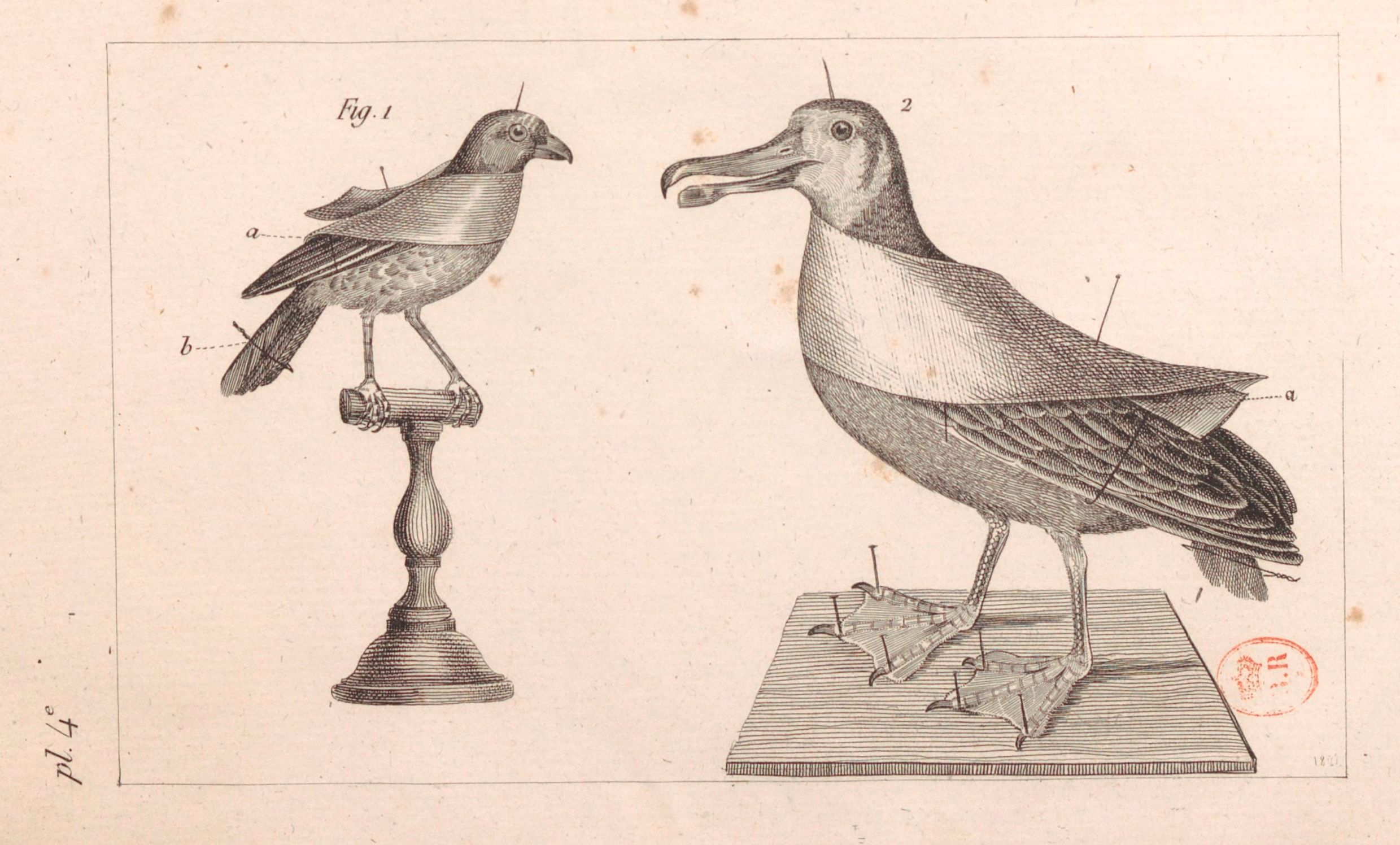
Mounted specimens
