= Vittore Soranzo =

16th-century Catholic bishop

Most Reverend Vittore Soranzo
- Bishop of Bergamo
- Church: Catholic Church
- Diocese: Diocese of Bergamo
- In office: 1547–1552
- Predecessor: Pietro Bembo
- Successor: Luigi Lippomano

Personal details
- Born: 26 July 1500 Venice, Italy
- Died: 13 May 1558 (age 57) Venice, Italy

Vittore Soranzo (Venice, 26 July 1500 – Venice, 13 May 1558) was an Italian bishop who served as Bishop of Bergamo (1547–1552).

== Bibliography ==
- Dursteler, Eric R., ed. (2013). "Religious Life". A Companion to Venetian History, 1400-1797. Brill's Companions to European History, 4. Boston-Leiden: Brill. pp. 379–420. ISBN 978-90-04-25252-3.
- Massimo Firpo and Sergio Pagano, I processi inquisitoriali di Vittore Soranzo (1550-1558), Città del Vaticano, Archivio segreto vaticano, 2004 ISBN 88-85042-40-6
- Massimo Firpo, Vittore Soranzo, vescovo ed eretico. Riforma della Chiesa e Inquisizione nell'Italia del Cinquecento, Roma-Bari, Laterza, 2006 ISBN 88-420-8134-5
- Lea, Henry Charles (1922). The Inquisition in the Spanish Dependencies: Silicy--Naples--Sardinia--Milan--the Canaries--Mexico--Peru--New Granada. New York: Macmillan. pp. 126–127.

== External links and additional sources ==
- Cheney, David M. "Diocese of Bergamo". Catholic-Hierarchy.org. (for Chronology of Bishops) ^{[self-published]}
- Chow, Gabriel. "Diocese of Bergamo (Italy)". GCatholic.org. (for Chronology of Bishops) ^{[self-published]}

Catholic Church titles
Preceded by Pietro Bembo	Bishop of Bergamo; 1547–1552	Succeeded by Luigi Lippomano
