= Duarte da Ponte Ribeiro =

Portuguese-born Brazilian diplomat (1795–1878)

His Excellency The Baron of Ponte Ribeiro
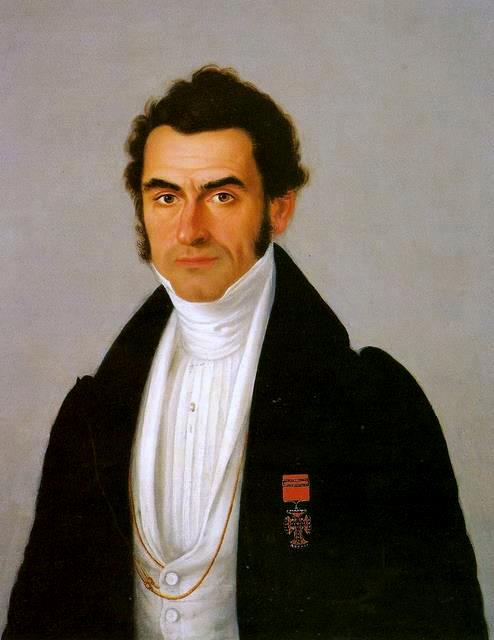

Personal details
- Born: 4 March 1795 Viseu
- Died: 1 September 1878 (aged 83) Rio de Janeiro

Duarte da Ponte Ribeiro, Baron of Ponte Ribeiro (Viseu; 4 March 1795 – Rio de Janeiro; 1 September 1878) was a Portuguese-born Brazilian medical doctor, diplomat and cartographer. He was the only baron of Ponte Ribeiro.

== Biography ==
Born in Portugal to surgeon José da Costa Quiroga da Ponte Ribeiro and Ana Ribeiro, he arrived in Brazil in 1807. In 1811, at the age of 16, he graduated as a surgeon from the Faculty of Medicine of Bahia.

Shortly after Brazil's independence, a cause he supported, he was appointed consul general in Spain, where he was tasked with having the country recognise Brazil's independence. He later served as a diplomat in Lisbon, Mexico, Peru, Bolivia and Buenos Aires until the Platine War, where he played an important role.

Between 1836 and 1841, he became the Empire's representative to the Peru-Bolivian Confederation, with which he negotiated a draft trade treaty, an opportunity in which he employed the thesis of Uti possidetis de facto. Although the treaty was rejected by the General Assembly, the doctrine became a principle in Brazil's boundary negotiations, when it was adopted as a guideline by the baron of Rio Branco.

He was honored as commander of the Imperial Order of Christ, in 1841, and great dignitary of the Imperial Order of the Rose. Furthermore, he was part of the Imperial Council and a noble knight of the Imperial House.

He was also a member of the Brazilian Historic and Geographic Institute (IHGB) from 1838.
