= Durant da Ponte =

Durant da Ponte (7 July 1918 – 9 July 1964) was a professor of American literature at the University of Tennessee. He was one of the founders of the Kentucky-Tennessee American Studies Association. Graduate students there can receive the Durant da Ponte American Literature Fellowship, which was founded in his memory.

== Life ==
Durant da Ponte was born on July 7, 1918, in New Orleans, Louisiana, to Harry Graham da Ponte II and Julia Pratt. He was a direct descendant of opera librettist Lorenzo da Ponte. He was the oldest of three children, having a younger sister Lyndall, and a younger brother, Harry Graham da Ponte III. He married Martha Lee Osborne, a former professor of philosophy at the University of Tennessee, and had two children, David and Graham. He died in the crash of United Airlines Flight 823 in 1964.
