= Francesco da Ponte =

Italian painter (1475–1539)

Francesco da Ponte the Elder (Italian: Francesco da Ponte il Vecchio; c. 1475 – 1539), or Francesco Bassano the Elder (Francesco Bassano il Vecchio), was an Italian Renaissance painter of the Venetian School.

Born in Vicenza, after training in Venice he established himself at Bassano. If not an actual pupil of Giovanni Bellini, he was a follower of his style. He painted a St. Bartholomew for the cathedral of Bassano, an altarpiece for the church of San Giovanni, and a Descent of the Holy Ghost for the village church of Oliero.

Francesco died in Bassano in 1539. His son Jacopo da Ponte gained prominence as a painter in Venice and its Republic. One of Jacopo's sons was the painter Francesco da Ponte the Younger.
