= Giovanni Maironi da Ponte =

Italian writer

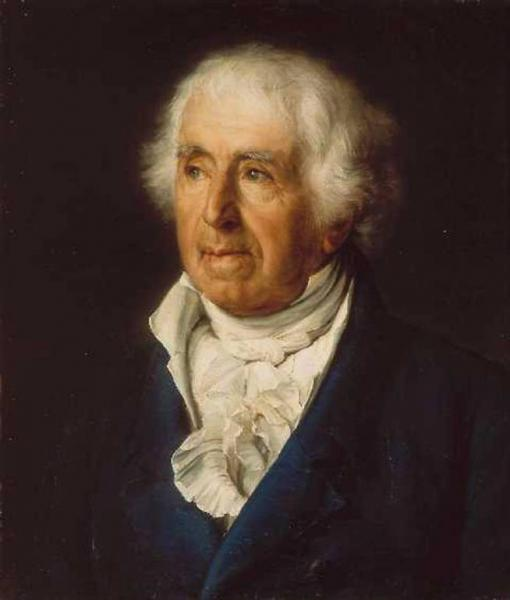
Portrait by Giovanni Carnovali, 1826

Giovanni Antonio Maironi da Ponte (28 February 1748 – 29 January 1833) was an Italian writer and scholar. He took an interest in politics, public education, geology, and natural history, particularly of the Bergamo region.

Maironi da Ponte was born in Bergamo where his parents Giuseppe and Giovanna Cadonici belonged to local nobility. He was educated at the Marian college after which he attended lectures in Pavia under Lazzaro Spallanzani and Giovanni Antonio Scopoli. He joined the Venetian government as a head of the civic health committee from 1773 and later became a secretary. He began to examine the natural history and economy of the province of Bergamo from 1776. In 1777 he wrote an essay on national education. He was a correspondent to the Accademia nazionale delle scienze. After the French revolution he was in charge of diplomatic activities dealing with French populations in Bergamo. In 1802 he represented the region in France.

He married Maddalena Orsini and they had eight children.

== See also ==
- Lake Leffe
