= Giovanni Battista da Ponte =

Italian painter ()

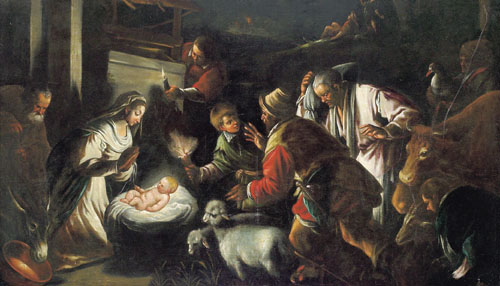
The Adoration of the Shepherds

Giovanni Battista da Ponte (1553–1613), also known as Giovanni Battista Bassano, was an Italian painter of the Renaissance period, active in Venice and his native Bassano del Grappa. The second son of Jacopo da Ponte, he was chiefly known as a copyist of his father's works. Many of his productions now figure under Jacopo's name.
