= Vincenzo Baldoni =

Italian architect

- Born: 19 August 1924; Sicignano degli Alburni, Province of Salerno, Kingdom of Italy
- Died: 23 January 2003 (aged 78); Matera, Basilicata, Italy
- Education: University of Naples
- Occupations: Architect, urban planner

Vincenzo Baldoni (19 August 1924 – 23 January 2003) was an Italian architect and urban planner.

== Life and career ==
Baldoni graduated in architecture from the University of Naples in 1952, under the supervision of Marcello Canino. He began his professional career that same year, working on the exhibition design for the Mostra del Lavoro Italiano nel Mondo (formerly Mostra d'Oltremare) in Naples. In 1953, he moved to Matera at the invitation of architect Luigi Piccinato to contribute to the new master plan and, in particular, to address the complex issue of restoring the Sassi.

In the following years, Baldoni held various institutional and urban planning roles, including a position in the Regional Plan Secretariat for Campania and Molise and membership in the INA-Casa housing program under the guidance of Roberto Pane. He also collaborated with the Planning Office of the Naples Redevelopment Society. In 1961, he received an IN/ARCH mention for his contributions in Basilicata, and in 1968, alongside architect Cleto Barbato, he won first prize at the IN/ARCH national competition for the design and supervision of the new Agricultural Technical Institute in Matera.

Throughout his career, Baldoni designed and directed numerous public works, including schools, healthcare facilities, and the expansion and exhibition design of the National Archaeological Museum in Matera. He played a central role in Matera's urban planning, overseeing the city's general master plan (1967) and winning competitions for the new business district (Centro direzionale) and the design of the City Hall and Courthouse.

His contributions extended to the industrial and residential sectors, with projects such as the Office Building for the Industrial Development Consortium of the Basento Valley and various residential buildings in Rome and Matera. As a technical director at the Matera Public Housing Institute (IACP), Baldoni played a key role in shaping social housing in the region.

He was also active in architectural conservation, directing significant restoration projects such as the 16th-century Tramontano Castle (1977) and the 18th-century Palazzo Lanfranchi (1981). In 1985, together with his son Renato, also an architect, he designed a conservation laboratory and archive for the Ministry of Cultural Heritage.

He died in January 2003. Three years later, a retrospective exhibition dedicated to his work was curated by Marco Pagano.

== Sources ==
- Baldoni, Vincenzo (1990). Palazzo Lanfranchi: appunti sui rinvenimenti nel corso del restauro. IEM.
- D'Onofrio, Renato (1997). "Vincenzo Baldoni architetto". AB. Architetti di Basilicata. No. 4. pp. 44–47.
- Filazzola, Nicola (2023). "L'eredità di Baldoni". Musa plebea. Fuga dagli estetismi. Poesie, disegni, scritti e una intervista a Tonino Guerra. Albatros Il Filo.
- Fabio Isman, ed. (1991). Pietra su pietra. Dieci anni di restauri in Italia. Laterza.
- Loforese, Antonio Giulio (2017). "Vincenzo Baldoni. Schizzi e disegni / Vincenzo Baldoni. Sketches and drawings". In Marco Bini; Stefano Bertocci (eds.). Le ragioni del disegno / The Reasons of Drawing. Rome: Gangemi Editore. p. 865–872.
- Pontrandolfi, Alfonso (2020). La vergogna cancellata. Matera negli anni dello sfollamento dei Sassi. Altrimedia.
- Pozzi, Carlo (1998). "Identità di Matera. Architetture di Vincenzo Baldoni". L'Industria delle Costruzioni. No. 319. pp. 36–41.
