= Matera Courthouse =

Judiciary building in Matera, Italy

- Interactive map of the Matera Courthouse area

General information
- Type: Courthouse
- Architectural style: Brutalist
- Location: Matera, Basilicata, Italy
- Coordinates: 40°39′57.9″N 16°35′59.9″E
- Construction started: 1972
- Completed: 1980

Design and construction
- Architect: Vincenzo Baldoni
- Engineer: Piergiorgio Corazza

The Matera Courthouse (Italian: Palazzo di Giustizia di Matera, lit. 'Palace of Justice of Matera') is a judicial complex located on Viale Aldo Moro in Matera, Italy.

== History ==
The project for the construction of the new courthouse in Matera was entrusted through a national competition to architect Vincenzo Baldoni and engineer Piergiorgio Corazza. It was drafted between 1965 and 1966. Construction began in 1972 and was completed in 1980.

Between 2004 and 2005, renovations were carried out on the first floor, involving expansion and compliance with accessibility standards.

== Description ==
The building reflects brutalist architectural characteristics. Its facades feature exposed concrete, with circular openings on the fronts. The main block extends over six levels and is complemented by a lower, more compact structure with ribbon windows.

According to Loforese (2017), the use of exposed reinforced concrete brings the project "back to the volumetric definition of the design, the linear impulses of the surfaces and the purity of forms, so it can be traced back to the original definition of the [Modern] movement in its greatest landmarks such as the Unité d'habitation in Marseille, Le Corbusier, and the Royal National Theatre in London, designed by Denys Lasdun".

== Sources ==
- Acito, Luigi (2017). Matera. Architetture del Novecento 1900-1970. Matera: La Stamperia Liantonio.
- Loforese, Antonio Giulio (2017). "Vincenzo Baldoni. Schizzi e disegni / Vincenzo Baldoni. Sketches and drawings". In Marco Bini; Stefano Bertocci (eds.). Le ragioni del disegno / The Reasons of Drawing. Rome: Gangemi Editore. p. 870.
- D'Onofrio, Renato (1997). "Vincenzo Baldoni architetto". AB. Architetti di Basilicata. No. 4. pp. 44–47.
- Pozzi, Carlo (1998). "Identità di Matera. Architetture di Vincenzo Baldoni". L'Industria delle Costruzioni. No. 319. pp. 36–41.
