= San Leonardo, Matera =

Church in Matera, Italy

Chiesa di San Leonardo

Religion
- Affiliation: Catholic
- Province: Matera

Location
- Location: Matera, Italy

The Church of San Leonardo, Italian: Chiesa di San Leonardo, is a cave church in the rione of Sasso Caveoso of Matera, in Basilicata in southern Italy. It takes its name from a fresco of San Leonardo. The church is deconsecrated, and was until recently used as a bakery. The date of foundation of the church is unknown; it was first documented in 1543–44, when it was without a door and repairs were ordered.

== Description ==
The church had two doors, of which one is now walled up. The interior consists of two naves divided by a massive central column of living rock. In the back wall there are three niches, which contain the altar and have traces of fresco. The fresco of San Leonardo was probably situated in a small niche, decorated with shells, on the left wall; only traces remain.
