= Palazzo dell'Annunziata =

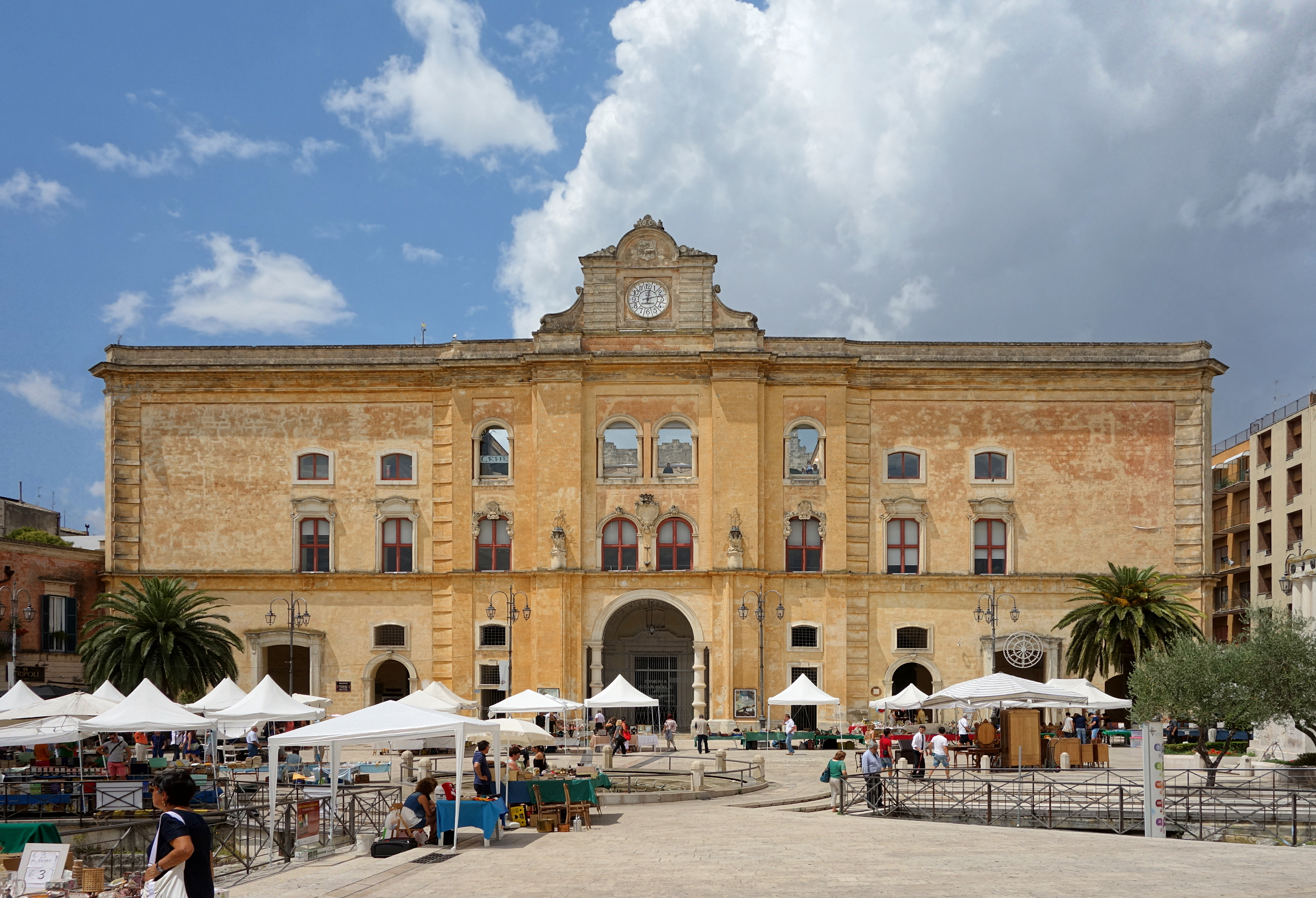
- Palazzo dell'Annunziata, Matera
- Interactive map of the Palazzo dell'Annunziata area

General information
- Location: Matera, Italy
- Coordinates: 40°40′01″N 16°36′21″E
- Construction started: 18th century
- Completed: 1747; 279 years ago

Design and construction
- Architects: Vito Valentino, Mauro Manieri

The Palazzo dell'Annunziata is a historical building in Matera, Italy.

The Palazzo was constructed in 1735 by architect Vito Valentino for the Rome Pontifical Commission. This can be inferred by the Convention between the Dominican nuns and the same Valentino, who, because of the urgency, makes an effort to finish the work in five years [1]. In 1734 the project is ready, in 1735 the works already proceed quickly, but soon the first difficulties are known: the building area on which the foundations rest is too deep: indeed it reaches about 15 meters (49 ft). The front is built on the sixteenth-century tower, belonging to the fortifications of Count Tramontano.

A strong quarrel between the administrator of the Dominican nuns and the architect Valentino starts so that in 1739 the works are suspended and Valentino is dismissed. The chronicles do not say anything about the causes of this dismissal. The hypothesis may be the delay of the work or the acquisition of other tasks by Valentino, who thus violates the agreements that forbid him to take on other commitments. Then the new architect, Mauro Manieri, called directly from Lecce with Simone brothers, takes over the task of completing the work: we are already in 1742.

Looking carefully at the walls and the vaults of the building we can infer the "change of hands" between the architects and identify that, with a good approximation, the works are suspended by Valentino in 1739, for example the difference can be seen in the texture of the walls and vaults. The original project the monastic complex by Valentino substantially reflects the current structure with the Church at the center and the spatial organization of the Monastery around it.

The changes introduced by Manieri can only be seen in the four side- windows, as he only provides the workers with the design of windows similar to those made in Lecce in some of his works. The chronicles of the time inform us that the Church is already built halfway up; indeed it can be noticed that the complex has reached about three meters above the level of the first floor. The new architect Mauro Manieri modifies the internal distribution and demolishes the Church, creating in its place an internal courtyard and planning the construction of a new one, outside the monastery. However, this Church will be never built.

Probably the Church, as it is typical of that historical period, has to have a central plan and a Greek cross. The walls of the rooms below are the foundations from which the shape of the Church can be inferred. From the underground structures we can read a more complex planimetric setting, on a hexagonal base with four side altars in addition to the main one [2]. Before the building comes to an end, the nuns temporarily are hosted by other congregations, only in 1747 they take possession of the new Monastery with the building not yet completed and without the Church. Even if it is unfinished, what emerges is the dimension of the facade: for the inhabitants of Matera it immediately appears huge enough to be, even today, a term of comparison for all the things that appear out of scale. About a hundred years later the nuns will finally decide to build the Church to give prestige and to finish the monastic complex. In 1844 the engineer Gaetano di Giorgio creates the Annunciation Church in the central courtyard of the monastic complex. In 1861 there is the suppression of the monastery and the property is transferred to the municipality.

The complex becomes partly Matera Court and the judicial offices and partly a junior school. In the early years of the 1900, the cornice is built, on which the clock is placed that completes the main facade. In the seventies it is proposed to locate the new headquarters of the Provincial Library in the monastery, returning to a unique function, the cultural one, on the basis of different parameters, the historical one (to understand the original idea as it developed throughout time), the static one ( to understand what the structural interventions could be), the functional one (to check the suitability to the new function) and the aesthetic one, the most demanding part of the project. For "Palazzo dell'Annunziata" they try to create a "synthesis" between past and future to put into practice the restoration work of the old building.

After the 1980 earthquake, the judicial offices and the junior school are moved to other buildings, because of the dangerous situation of the former convent. In total decay, in 1993 it is restored and on May 14, 1998, the provincial library, located inside it, is inaugurated in the presence of the Italian Prime Minister, Romano Prodi. The Provincial Library "Tommaso Stigliani" founded in 1933, with its location in via Don Minzoni, then in via San Rocco, later in Malvinni-Malvezzi palace in the Cathedral square and at the Capuchin convent, finds its final seat. Inside, in addition to the important and huge collection of books and manuscripts, there is an important numismatic collection.

The old church has been used as a municipal cinema, while some spaces on the ground floor hosted the provincial media library.

== See also ==
- Matera
- Sassi di Matera
