= Orecchiette alla materana =

Italian pasta with meat sauce

Orecchiette alla materana is a pasta dish typical of the comune (municipality) of Matera, Basilicata. It is made with fresh orecchiette pasta, tomatoes, lamb, mozzarella, pecorino cheese, extra virgin olive oil, and salt.

== See also ==
- List of pasta
- List of pasta dishes
