= Castello Tramontano =

- Southern Italy
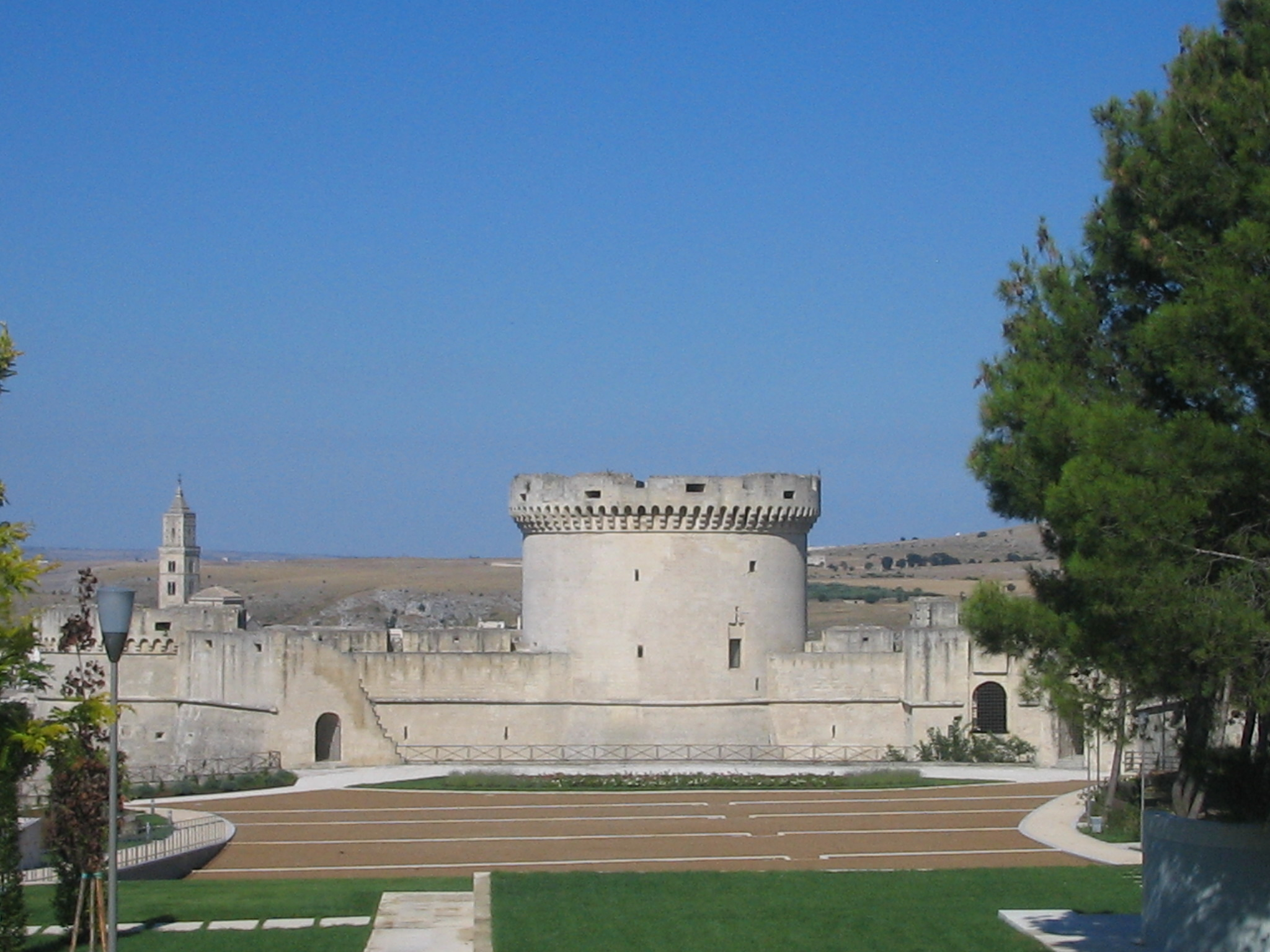

Site information
- Condition: Preserved

Location
- Location within Italy
- Coordinates: 40°39′50″N 16°36′21″E

Site history
- Built: 16th century

Castello Tramontano is a 16th-century fortification situated on Lapellio Hill, above the historical city of Matera with in the Basilicata Administrative Region. It was built to control the local population.

The city has been used many times as a set to represent the Holy Land in films including: Pier Paolo Pasolini's "The Gospel According to St. Matthew" and Mel Gibson's "The Passion of the Christ".

== History ==
The Castello was constructed in an Aragonese style, with a taller central tower and two lower side towers, both round, crenellated, and equipped with loops.

Construction began in 1501, by Giovanni Carlo Tramontano, Count of Matera. King Ferdinand II of Naples, had promised the Materrani people that he would keep the hands of the feudal lords off the city, after Matera had already freed itself several times from the feudal yoke by paying various ransoms to remain a free city. Recognition of such a status is directly dependent on the crown. Instead, Count Tramontano, who boasted claims against the royal treasury, asked and obtained the County of Matera in 1496.

Due to the heavy debts the county was burdened with, he taxed the Materani people, leading to a decline in the public opinion. This taxation allowed for the construction of the castle that was situated on a hill dominating the city outside the city walls, with the purpose of feudal control of the surrounding lands rather than defense of the city itself. 25,000 ducats were spent in total on the construction. The latter, at the time, was believed to include other defensive towers, one of which was found under the central Piazza Vittorio Veneto in Matera, together with other underground developments.

In response, some dissatisfied citizens gathered together and hid behind a stone, which has since been called "la pietra del mal consiglio" (transl. stone of bad advice), and organized a coup against the Count. On 29 December 1514, the Count was assassinated in a side street leaving the Cathedral of the same name, which was later called "Way of Ransom".

The castle thus remained unfinished. Restoration work began in 2008, owing to the castle and surrounding park falling into disrepair. Notably, these restorations, financed by lottery funds, aim to renovate the moat alongside the tufa walls, but it is currently closed to the public.

== See also ==
- City of Matera

== Bibliography ==
- Canino, Antonio (1980). Basilicata Calabria. Touring Editore. ISBN 88-365-0021-8.
- Matera: il Castello Tramontano. La Tipografica. 2010.
- Retrospettiva di un delitto: Giovan Carlo Tramontano e il castello di Matera. G. Barile. 2014.
