= Giovanni Carlo Tramontano, Count of Matera =

Italian nobleman

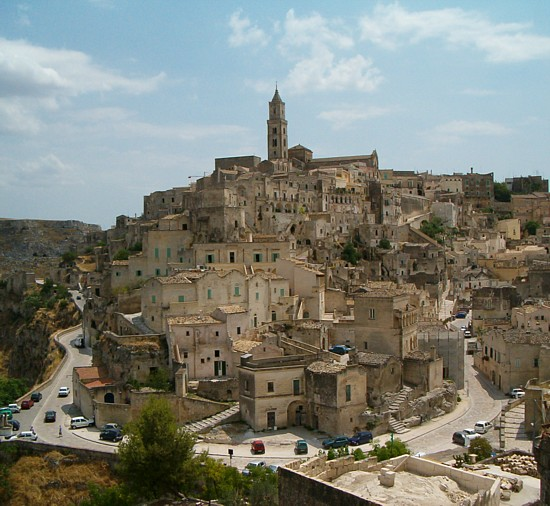
The County and the City of Matera

Giovanni Carlo Tramontano, Baron of Sorrento, Count of Matera (born in 1451 as Giovanni Carlo Tramontano, Baron of Sorrento, died in 1514) was an Italian nobleman who belonged to the ancient feudal noble family of the barons of the House of Tramontano.

The Baron of Sorrento was often called "Giancarlo" or "Gian Carlo", short for Giovanni Carlo.

== Count of Matera ==
The Baron Giovanni Carlo Tramontano of Sorrento was on October 1, 1497, given the city of Matera in the Southern Italy region of Basilicata as his county by the King in Naples, Ferdinand II of Aragon.

Giancarlo Baron Tramontano was given the title Count of Matera and built the famous Castello Tramontano ("Castle Tramontano").

== A visit in Naples ==
After 9 years as the ruler of Matera the Count almost lost his power in 1506. King Ferdinand II did announce on October 9, 1506, that he intended to remove counties and baronies from several counts and barons in the kingdom because he wanted to give them to a group of Spanish noblemen.

In hope of being able to keep his county Count Giovanni Carlo and his wife Countess Elisabetta Restigliano went to the royal court in Naples where the Countess gave the Queen a gold necklace with 25 very valuable pearls worth 700 ducats.

As a result, the King permitted Count Gian Carlo Tramontano of Matera to keep his county.

== The people rebel ==
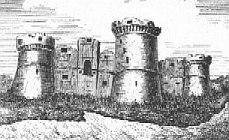
Castello Tramontano (Castle Tramontano)

The aristocracy and the people of Matera considered the Count arrogant, a tyrant and a ruler without mercy—especially because he demanded a lot of taxes from the people so that he could live in luxury.

On December 28, 1514, the Count demanded that the aristocracy and the people pay him 24.000 ducates—so that the Count could pay his debts.

The people wouldn't accept this. On December 29, 1514, Count Giancarlo and his wife Countess Elisabetta went to mass. When the Count and the Countess came out of the church the Count was beaten to death by a group of rebellious men. The Countess was allowed to escape.

After the murder the church bells rang constantly to mark the death of the Count. The people of Matera celebrated this event.

The King in Naples considered the murder of Count Gian Carlo a political assassination and a way to hit the throne. Therefore, he sent a commissary to Matera to solve the crime. Four innocent men were hanged but the guilty criminals were never found.

== In popular culture ==
Il Conte di Matera ("The Count of Matera"), a 1957 film directed by Luigi Capuano, starring Virna Lisi and Otello Toso.

== See also ==
- House of Tramontano
- City of Matera
