= Matera =

Matera Matàrë (Materano)
- Comune
- Comune di Matera
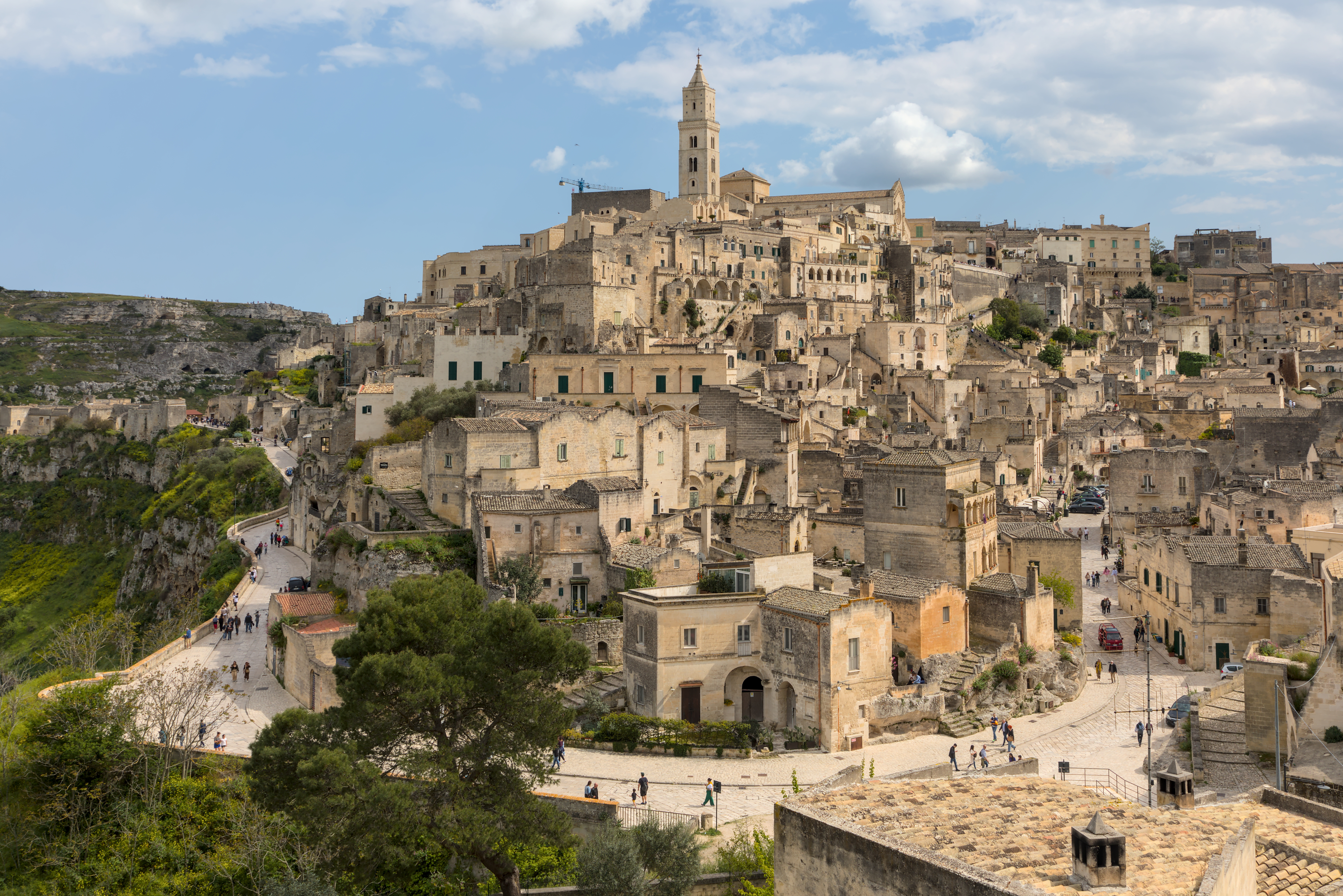
- Panorama of the old town from the parvise of Saint Augustin church

- Flag Coat of arms

- Matera within the Province of Matera

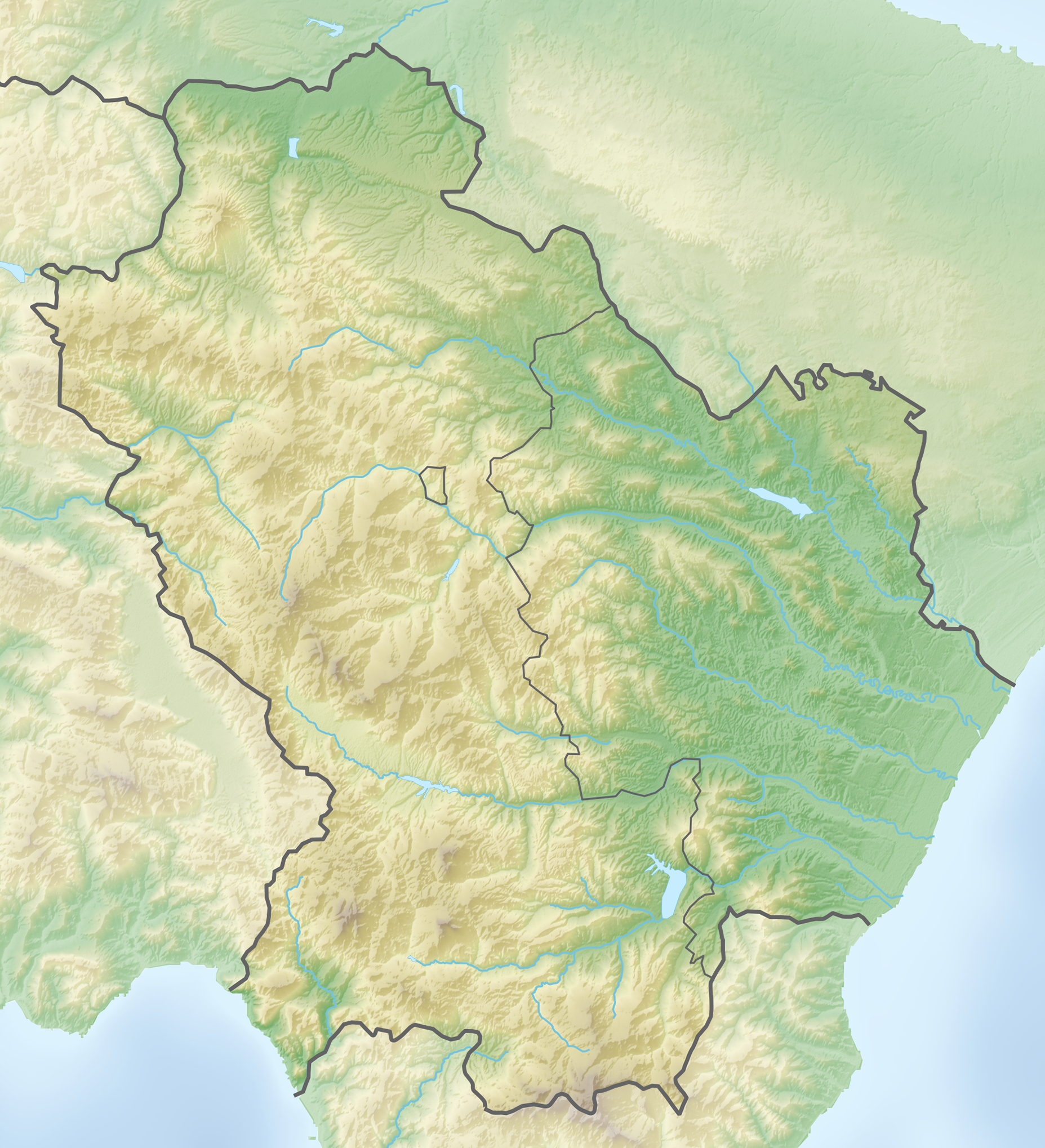
- Location within Basilicata Location within Italy
- Coordinates: 40°40′N 16°36′E
- Country: Italy
- Region: Basilicata
- Province: Matera (MT)
- Frazioni: La Martella, Venusio, Picciano A, Picciano B

Government
  - Mayor: Antonio Nicoletti (Centre-right independent)

Area
  - Total: 387.4 km^{2} (149.6 sq mi)
- Elevation: 401 m (1,316 ft)

Population (January 1, 2018)
  - Total: 60,403
  - Density: 155.9/km^{2} (403.8/sq mi)
- Demonym: Materani
- Time zone: UTC+1 (CET)
  - Summer (DST): UTC+2 (CEST)
- Postal code: 75100
- Dialing code: 0835
- ISTAT code: 077014
- Patron saint: Madonna della Bruna
- Saint day: July 2
- Website: Official website

The Sassi and the Park of the Rupestrian Churches of Matera
UNESCO World Heritage Site
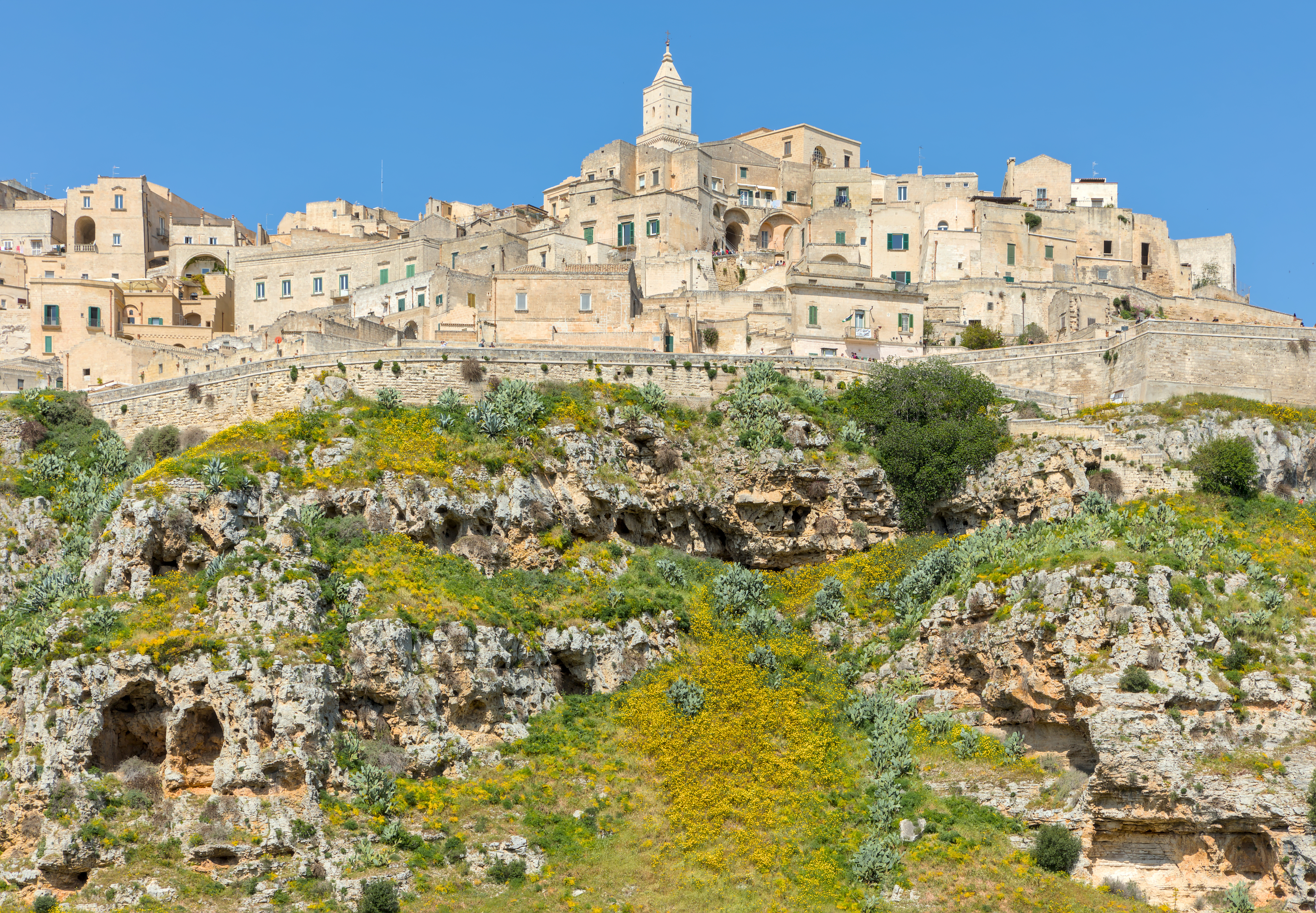
- The Sassi of Matera
- Interactive map of The Sassi and the Park of the Rupestrian Churches of Matera
- Criteria: Cultural: iii, iv, v
- Reference: 670
- Inscription: 1993 (17th Session)
- Area: 1,016 ha (2,510 acres)
- Buffer zone: 4,365 ha (10,790 acres)

Matera (Italian pronunciation: [maˈtɛːra], locally [maˈteːra]; Materano: Matàrë [maˈtæːrə]) is a city and the capital of the Province of Matera in the region of Basilicata, in Southern Italy. With a history of continuous occupation dating back to prehistory (the eighth millennium BC), it is renowned for its rock-cut urban core, whose twin cliffside zones are known collectively as the Sassi.

Matera lies on the right bank of the Gravina river, whose canyon forms a geological boundary between the hill country of Basilicata (historic Lucania) to the southwest and the Murgia plateau of Apulia to the northeast. The city began as a complex of cave habitations excavated in the softer limestone on the gorge's western, Lucanian face. It took advantage of two streams that flow into the ravine from a spot near the Castello Tramontano, reducing the cliff's angle of drop and leaving a defensible narrow promontory between the streams. The central high ground, or acropolis, supporting the city's cathedral and administrative buildings, came to be known as Civita, and the settlement districts scaling down and burrowing into the sheer rock faces as the Sassi. Of the two streambeds, called the grabiglioni, the northern hosts Sasso Barisano (facing Bari) and the southern Sasso Caveoso (facing Montescaglioso).

The Sassi consist of approximately twelve levels spanning the height of 380 m, connected by a network of paths, stairways, and courtyards (vicinati). The medieval city clinging on to the edge of the canyon for its defense is invisible from the western approach. The tripartite urban structure of Civita and the two Sassi, relatively isolated from each other, survived until the sixteenth century, when the centre of public life moved outside the walls to the Piazza Sedile in the open plain (the Piano) to the west, followed by the shift of the elite residences to the Piano from the seventeenth century onward. By the end of the eighteenth century, a physical class boundary separated the overcrowded Sassi of the peasants from the new spatial order of their social superiors in the Piano, and geographic elevation came to coincide with status more overtly than before, to the point where the two communities no longer interacted socially.

Yet it was only at the turn of the twentieth century that the Sassi were declared unfit for modern habitation, and the government relocation of all their inhabitants to new housing in the Piano followed between 1952 and the 1970s. A new law in 1986 opened the path to restoration and reoccupation of the Sassi, this time – as noted by the architectural historian Anne Toxey – for the benefit of the wealthy middle class. The recognition of the Sassi, labelled la città sotterranea ("the underground city"), together with the rupestrian churches across the Gravina as a UNESCO World Heritage Site in December 1993 has assisted in attracting tourism and accelerated the reclaiming of the site. In 2019, Matera was declared a European Capital of Culture.

== History ==
Before its integration into the modern Italian state, the city of Matera had experienced the rule of the Romans, Lombards, Arabs, Byzantine Greeks, Swabians, Angevins, Aragonese, and Bourbons.

Although scholars continue to debate the date the dwellings were first occupied in Matera, and the continuity of their subsequent occupation, the area of what is now Matera is believed to have been settled since the Palaeolithic (tenth millennium BC). This makes it potentially one of the oldest continually inhabited settlements in the world. Alternatively, it has been suggested by Anne Toxey that the area has been "occupied continuously for at least three millennia".

Built on an entrenched prehistoric village, the town is likely to have Greek origins. In the times of Magna Graecia, Matera shared a close relationship with the Greek cities on the southern coast, becoming a trade and transit route in Roman times.Then the town of Matera was established by the Roman Lucius Caecilius Metellus in 251 BC who called it Matheola. In AD 664, Matera was conquered by the Lombards and became part of the Duchy of Benevento. During the seventh and eighth centuries, the nearby grottos were colonised by both Benedictine and Basilian monastic institutions. After the Arab conquest of Bari in 840, Matera came under Islamic rule. Emancipated from the old Lombard jurisdiction of the gastald of Acerenza in the Principality of Salerno, the town gained regional prominence.

In the spring of 867, it was burnt by the imperial troops of Louis II as the first key target in the emirate's conquest; the Chronicle of St. Benedict of Monte Cassino calls it a particularly well-defended site. The Franks soon fell out with the Lombards and the Byzantines, exploited the local need for protection from Arab raiding and internal Lombard divisions, to retake Apulia, which became the theme of Longobardia in 891/2. Already by 887, Matera's local Lombard elite bore Byzantine titles, the monastery of San Vincenzo al Volturno had to conduct business before the Byzantine judge and town notables of Matera, and the Greeks of Matera made up the Byzantine garrison of Naples. The precarious Byzantine rule had to contend with the ambitions of Lombard towns and nobles against the background of frequent incursions from the neighbouring duchy of Capua-Benevento and from Arab Sicily. In 940 Matera was besieged, possibly with local assistance, by the Lombards.

On 25 January 982 the army of Otto II camped before the walls of Matera on its way from Salerno to Taranto, ostensibly marching against the Arabs. In 994 Matera was temporarily captured by the Arabs after a four-month siege. The town continued to play a part in Byzantine governance: in June 1019 the chartoularios Stephanos of Matera assisted in the re-foundation of Troia. But civic unrest was also endemic and in 1040 the Byzantine judge Romanos was murdered at Matera by the local auxiliary troops during a wave of assaults on Byzantine officials that swept across the region. After the prominent Apulian rebels enlisted the support of the Normans and defeated the new katepano of Italy at Cannae in 1041, Matera fell within the scope of Norman incursions and struck a deal with the invaders. In retaliation for this, the next katepano Georgios Maniakes, dispatched to Italy with special powers in April 1042, carried out mass executions in Matera in June, only to launch a rebellion of his own in September.

After his departure Matera elected William Iron Arm as its count (1042), but like other towns it remained in Byzantine hands despite the Norman advances – in 1054 died Sico, the protospatharios of Matera. The city was seized in April 1064 as an independent acquisition by Robert, Count of Montescaglioso, a seditious nephew of Robert Guiscard, who profited from the involvement of his uncle further south. After count Robert died in July 1080, Matera accepted the rule of his brother Geoffrey of Conversano. Geoffrey's son Alexander joined a revolt against Roger II in 1132, but he fled before the advance of the king to Byzantium and left his son Geoffrey in Matera, whose inhabitants gave the city away to avoid being massacred by the royal troops. Alexander later took part in the Byzantine invasion of Italy in 1156. Lombard aristocrats survived with a reduced status: around 1150, Guaimar (III) of Capaccio, a descendant of Lombard princes, held a sub-fief near Matera from the count of Montescaglioso. Meanwhile, after a period of association with the Byzantine metropolis of Otranto from 968, the episcopal see of Matera was reclaimed by the archbishopric of Acerenza. A new cathedral church of St Eustace was consecrated in May 1082.

After a short communal phase and a series of pestilences and earthquakes, the city became an Aragonese possession in the fifteenth century, and on 1 October 1497, the city was sold to Giancarlo Tramontano. In 1514, however, the population rebelled against the oppression and killed Count Giovanni Carlo Tramontano. In the seventeenth century Matera was handed over to the Orsini and then became part of the Terra d'Otranto, in Apulia. Later it was capital of the province of Basilicata, a position it retained until 1806, when Joseph Bonaparte assigned it to Potenza.

In 1927, it became capital of the new province of Matera.

== Demographics ==
Historical population

Year	Pop.	±%
1861	14,434	—
1871	14,399	−0.2%
1881	15,593	+8.3%
1901	17,081	+9.5%
1911	17,726	+3.8%
1921	18,357	+3.6%
1931	20,163	+9.8%
1936	22,069	+9.5%

Year	Pop.	±%
1951	30,390	+37.7%
1961	38,562	+26.9%
1971	44,513	+15.4%
1981	50,712	+13.9%
1991	54,919	+8.3%
2001	57,785	+5.2%
2011	59,796	+3.5%
2021	59,748	−0.1%

Source: ISTAT

== Government ==
Since local government political reorganization in 1993, Matera has been governed by the city council of Matera. Voters elect directly 32 councilors and the mayor of Matera every five years.

== Main sights ==
=== The Sassi (ancient town) ===
The "Sassi di Matera" originated in a prehistoric troglodyte settlement, and these dwellings are thought to be among the earliest human settlements in what is now Italy. The Sassi are habitations dug into the calcareous rock, which is characteristic of Basilicata and Apulia. Many of them are little more than small caverns, and in some parts of the Sassi a street lies on top of another group of dwellings. The ancient town grew up on one slope of the rocky ravine created by a river that is now a small stream, and this ravine is known locally as "la Gravina". In the 1950s, as part of a policy to clear the extreme poverty of the Sassi, the government of Italy used force to relocate most of the population of the Sassi to new public housing in the developing modern city.

Until the late 1980s the Sassi was still considered an area of poverty, since its dwellings were, and in most cases still are, uninhabitable and dangerous. The present local administration, however, has become more tourism-orientated, and it has promoted the regeneration of the Sassi as a picturesque tourist attraction with the aid of the Italian government, UNESCO, and Hollywood. In 2008, the city began the candidacy process for a European Capital of Culture in 2019; it was designated one of the European Capitals of Culture for 2019 on 17 October 2014. Today there are many thriving businesses, pubs, and hotels there, and the city is amongst the fastest growing in southern Italy.

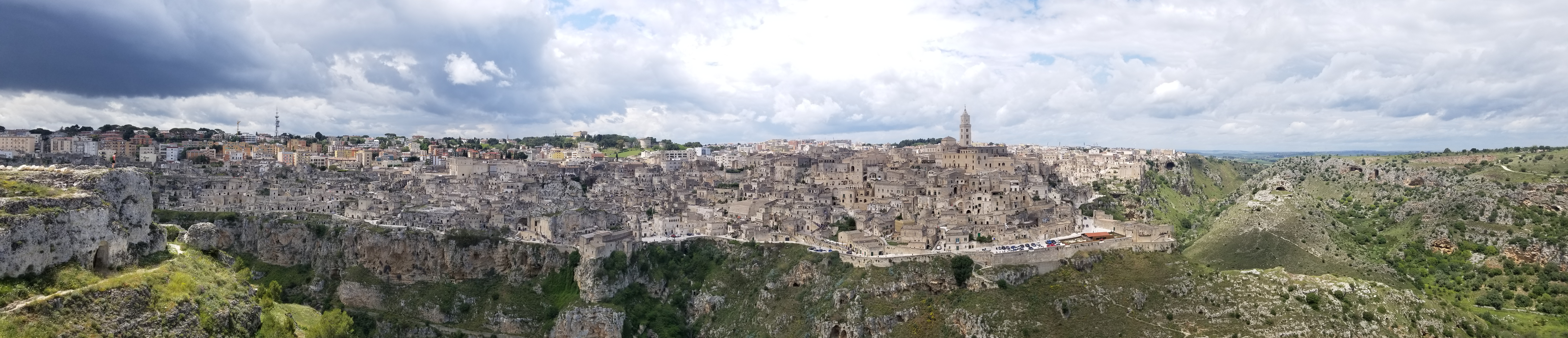
View from the Canyon (Gravina)

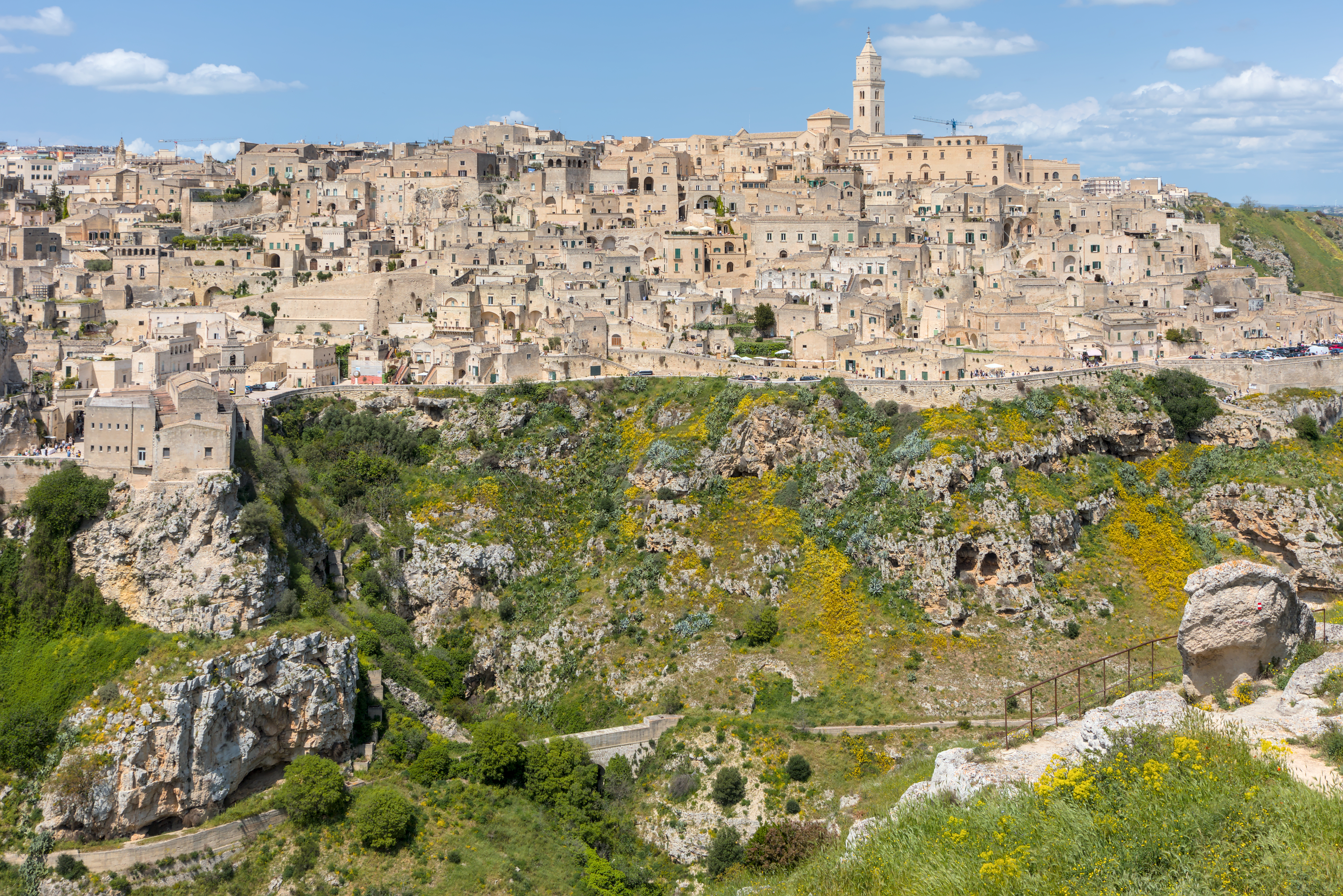
View from Belvedere Murgia Timone

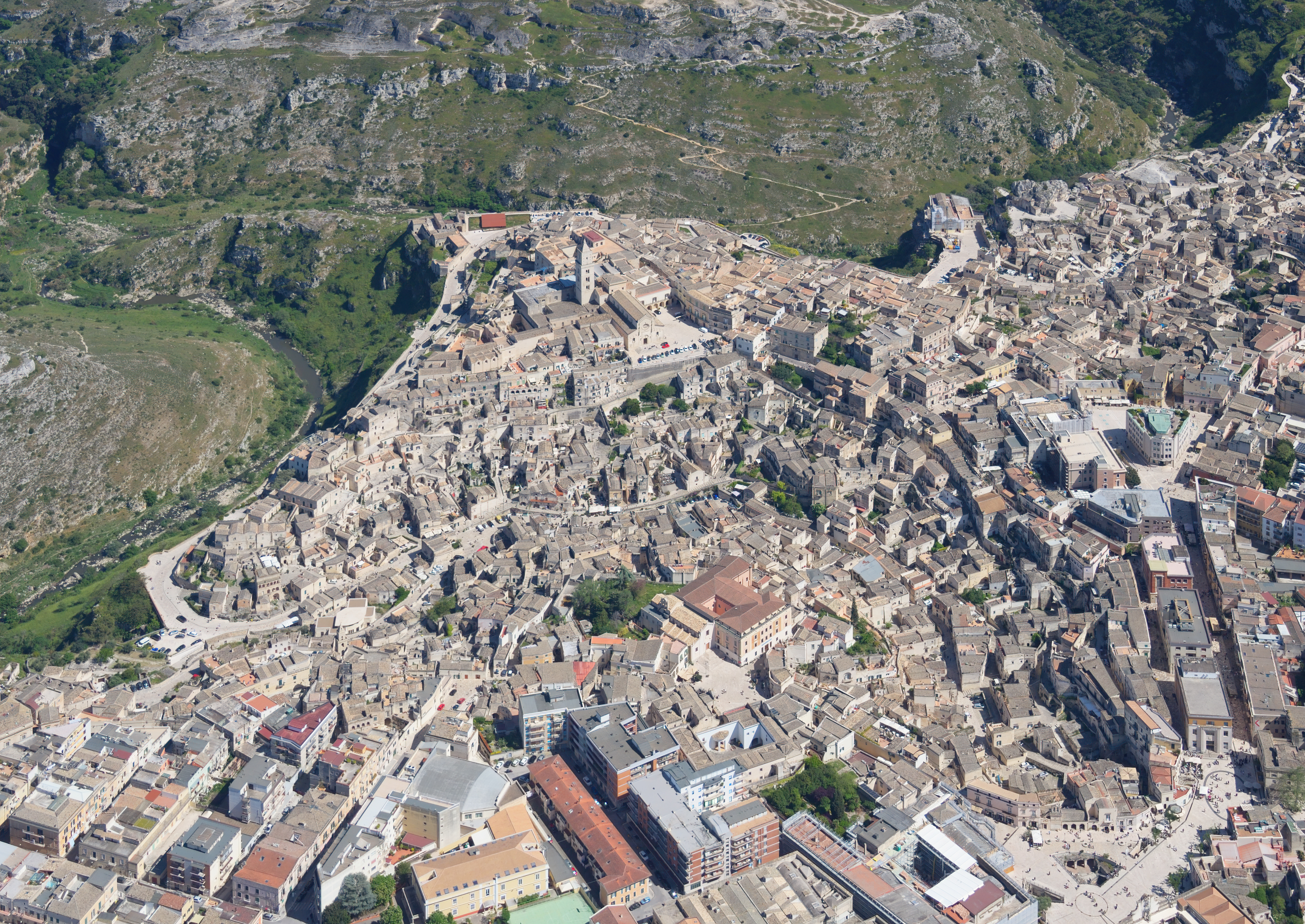
Aerial view of Matera

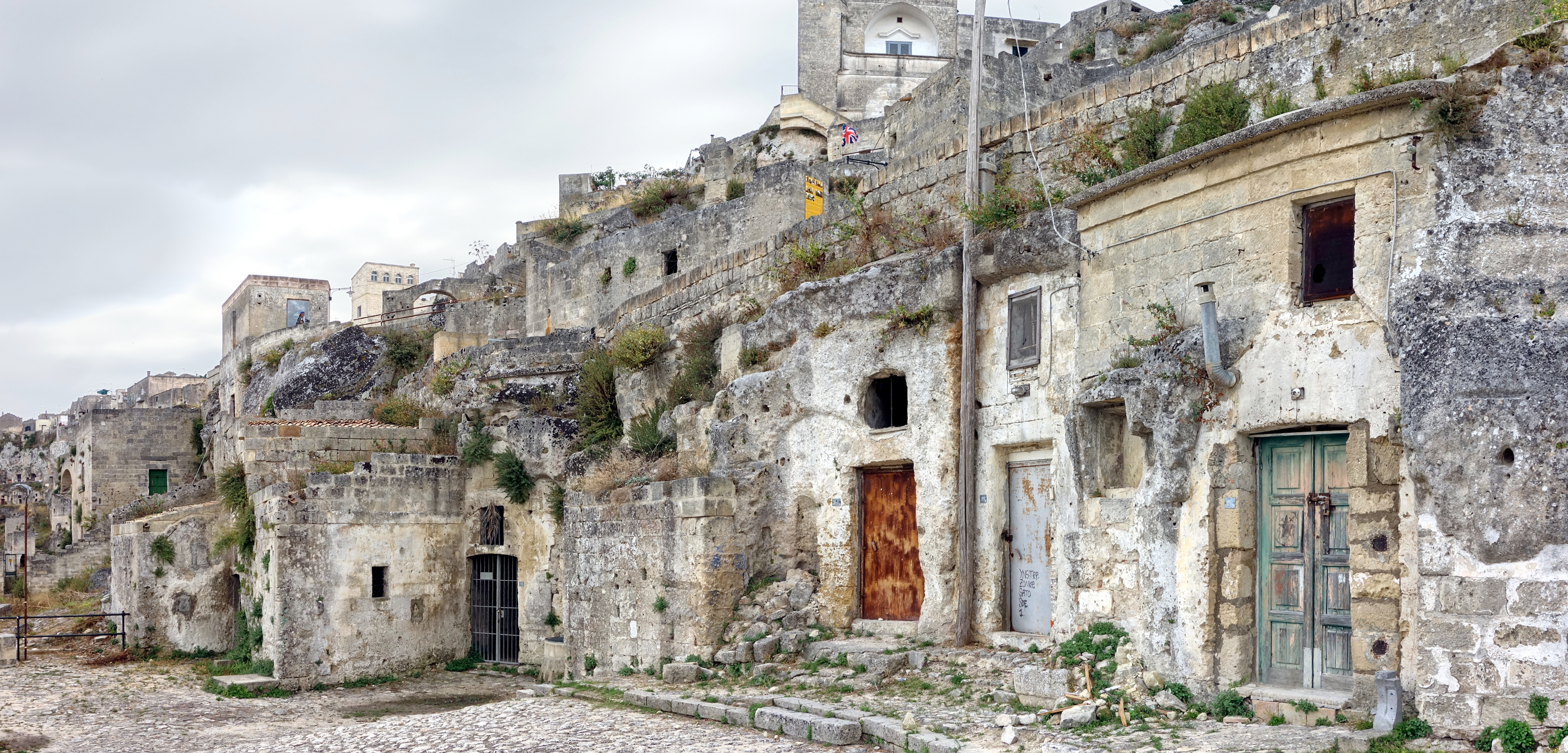
Houses in the Sassi

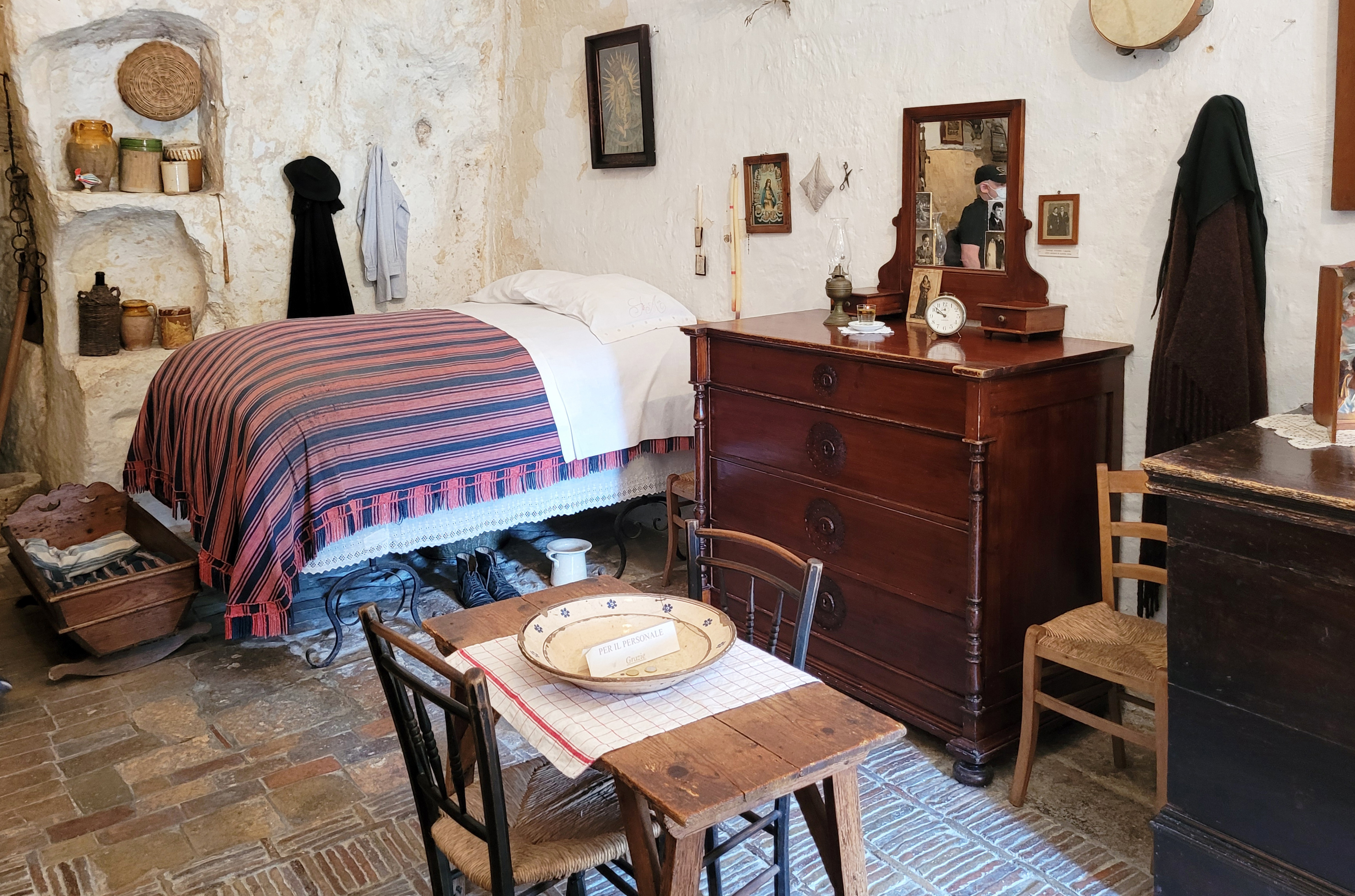
Interior of a cave house

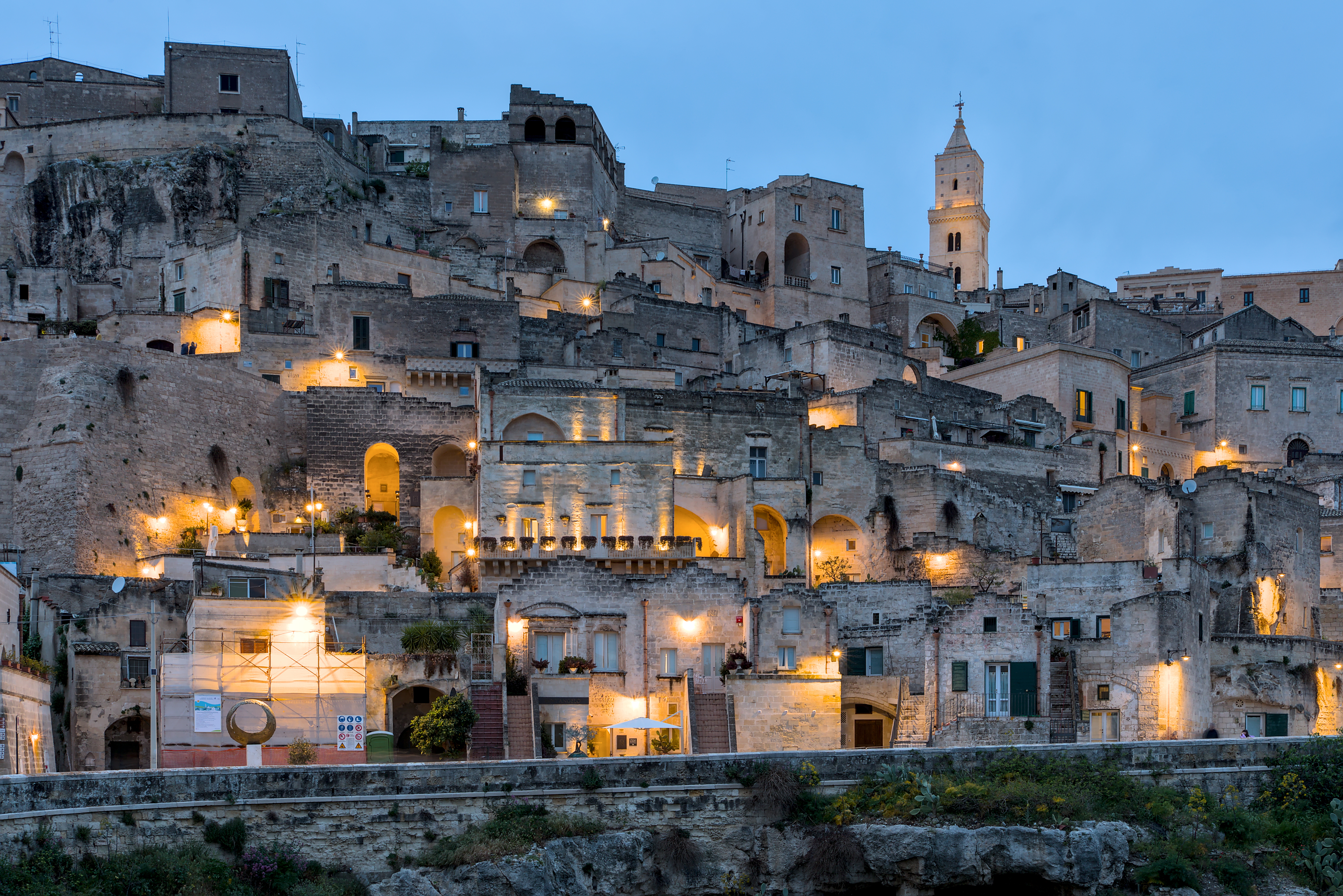
Sasso Barisano at blue hour

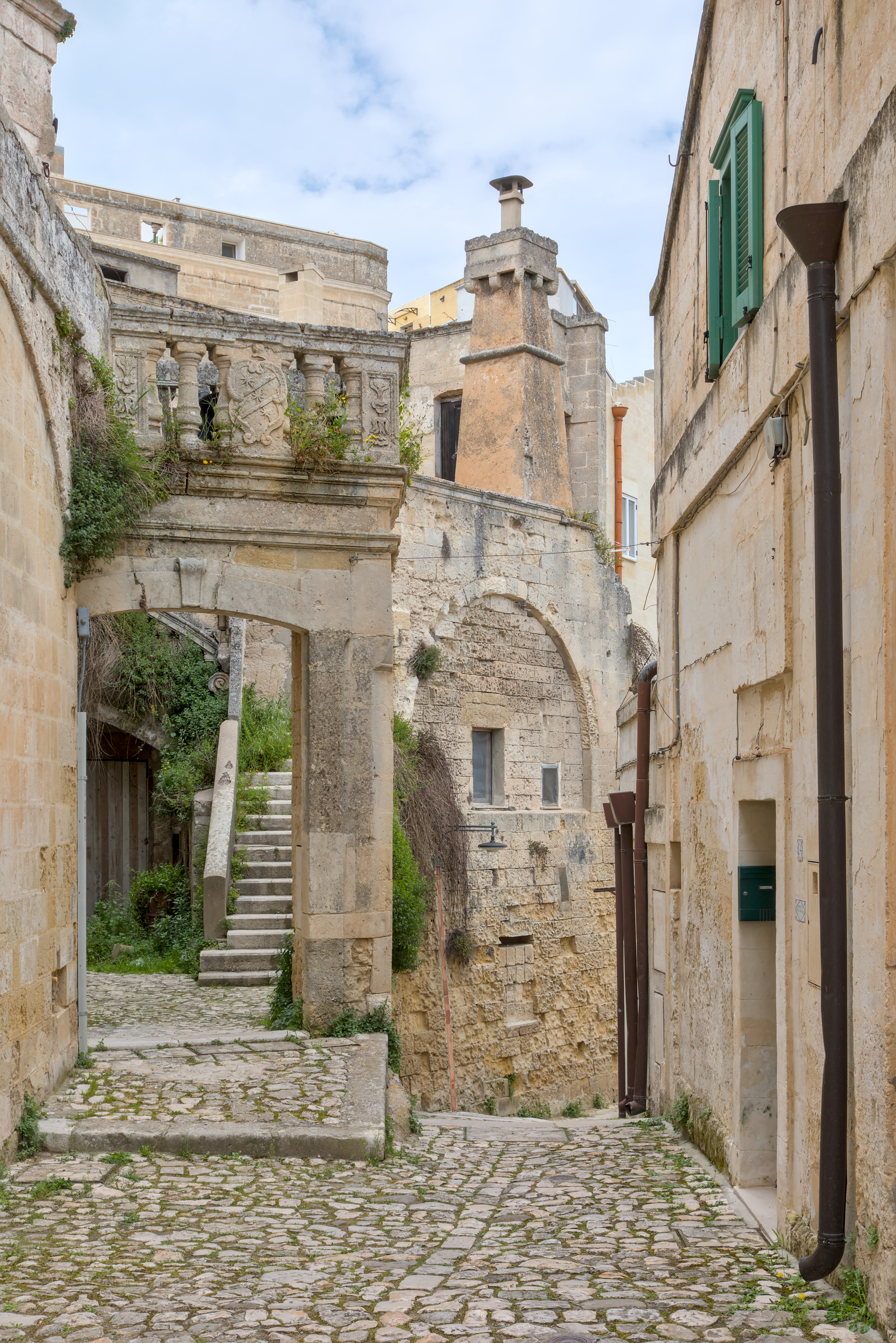
A street in Sasso Barrisano

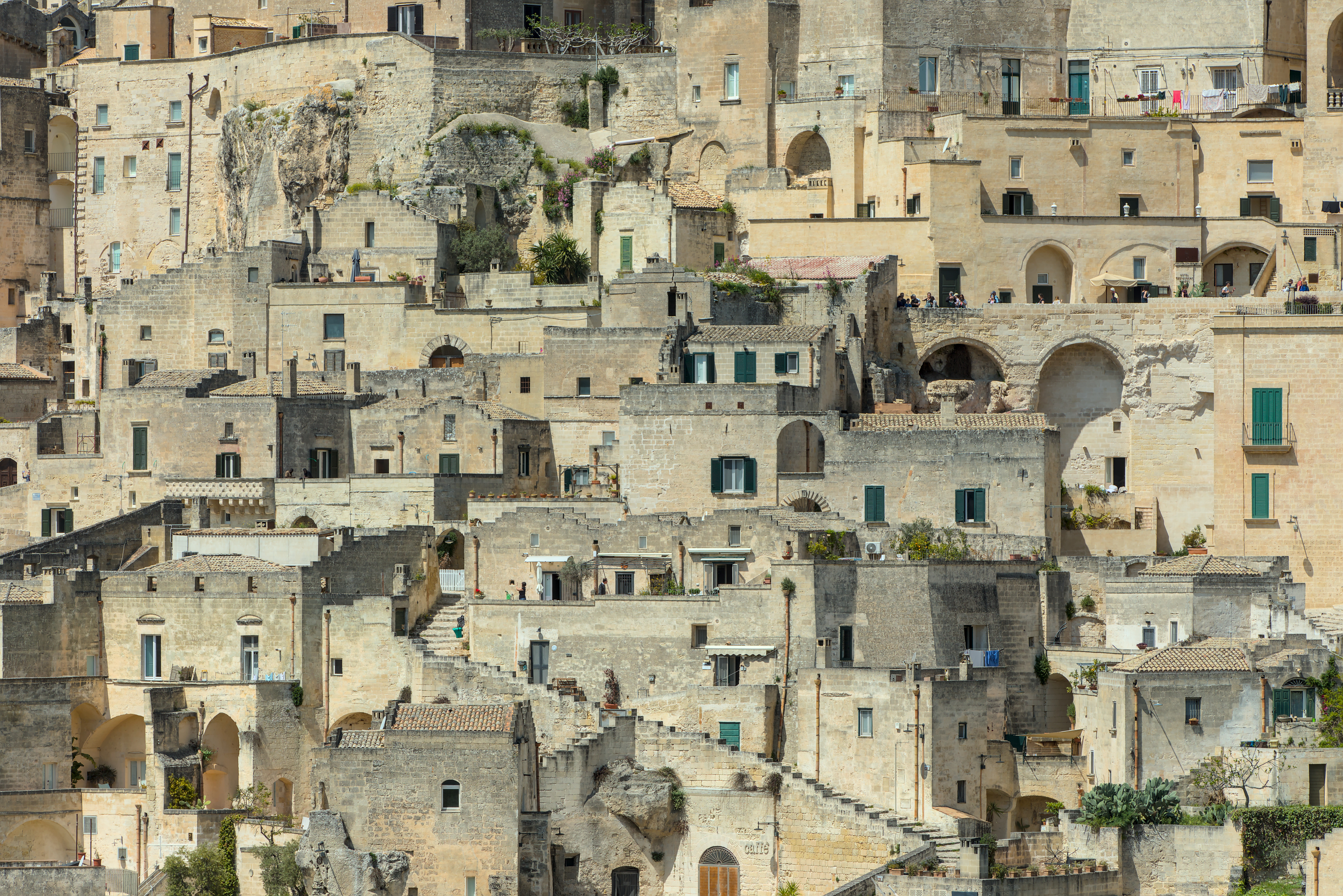
View of the Sassi, built on several levels

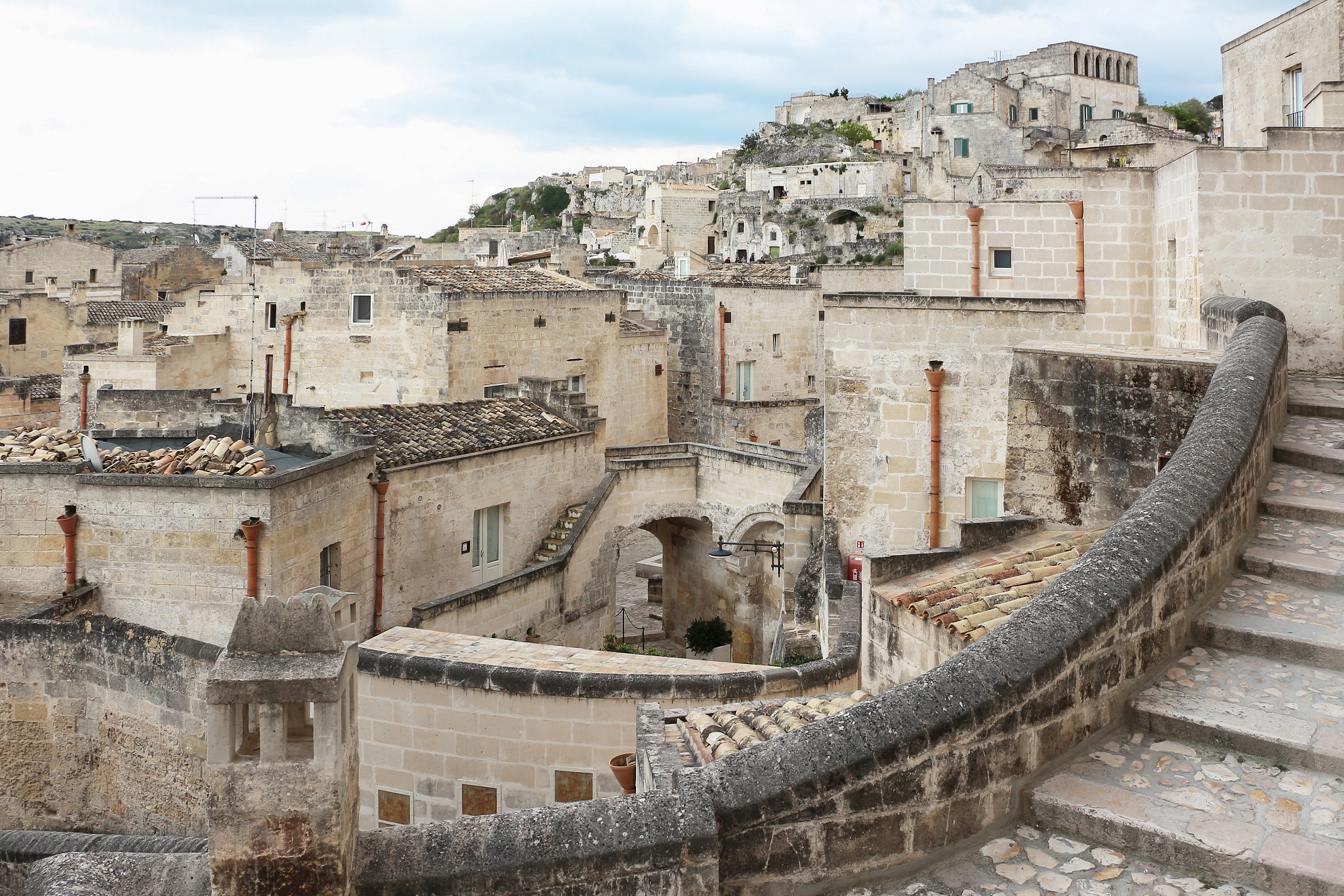
Sasso Caveoso

=== Monasteries and churches ===
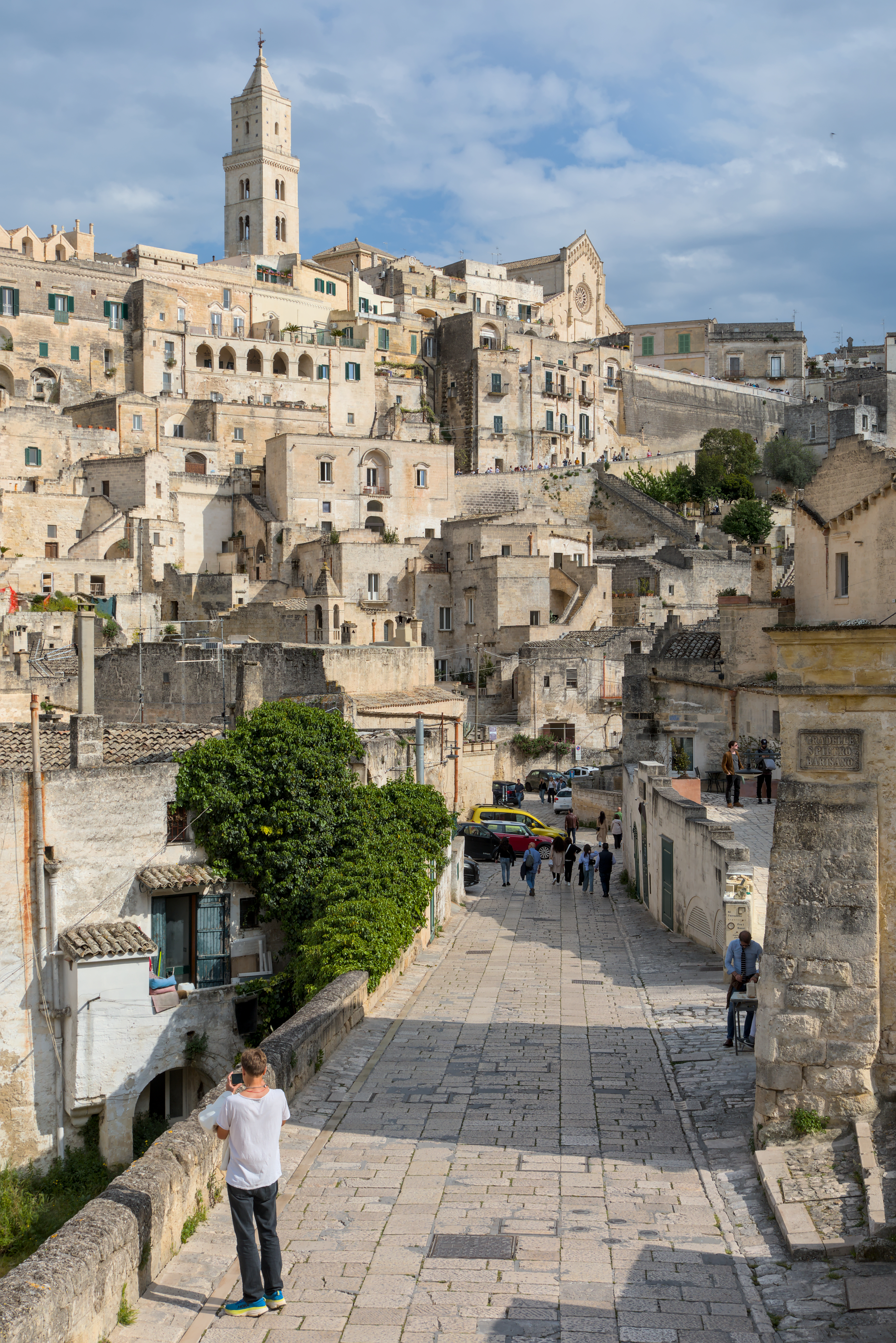
View of the cathedral from Via D'Addozio

Matera's buildings related to the Christian faith include a large number of rupestrian churches carved from the calcarenite rock of the region. These churches, which are also found in the neighbouring region of Apulia, were listed in the 1998 World Monuments Watch by the World Monuments Fund.

Matera Cathedral (1268–1270) has been dedicated to Santa Maria della Bruna since 1389. Built in an Apulian Romanesque architectural style, the church has a 52 m tall bell tower, and next to the main gate is a statue of the Maria della Bruna, backed by those of Saints Peter and Paul. The main feature of the façade is the rose window, divided by sixteen small columns. The interior is on the Latin cross plan, with a nave and two aisles. The decoration is mainly from the eighteenth century Baroque restoration, but recently a Byzantine-style fourteenth-century fresco portraying the Last Judgement has been discovered.

Two other important churches in Matera, both dedicated to the Apostle Peter, are San Pietro Caveoso (in the Sasso Caveoso) and San Pietro Barisano (in the Sasso Barisano). San Pietro Barisano was restored in a project by the World Monuments Fund, funded by American Express. The main altar and the interior frescoes were cleaned, and missing pieces of mouldings, reliefs, and other adornments were reconstructed from photographic archives or surrounding fragments.

Some other churches are simple caves with a single altar, occasionally accompanied by a fresco, often located on the opposite side of the ravine. Some complex cave networks with large underground chambers are thought to have been used for meditation by the rupestrian and cenobitic monks.

=== Cisterns and water collection ===
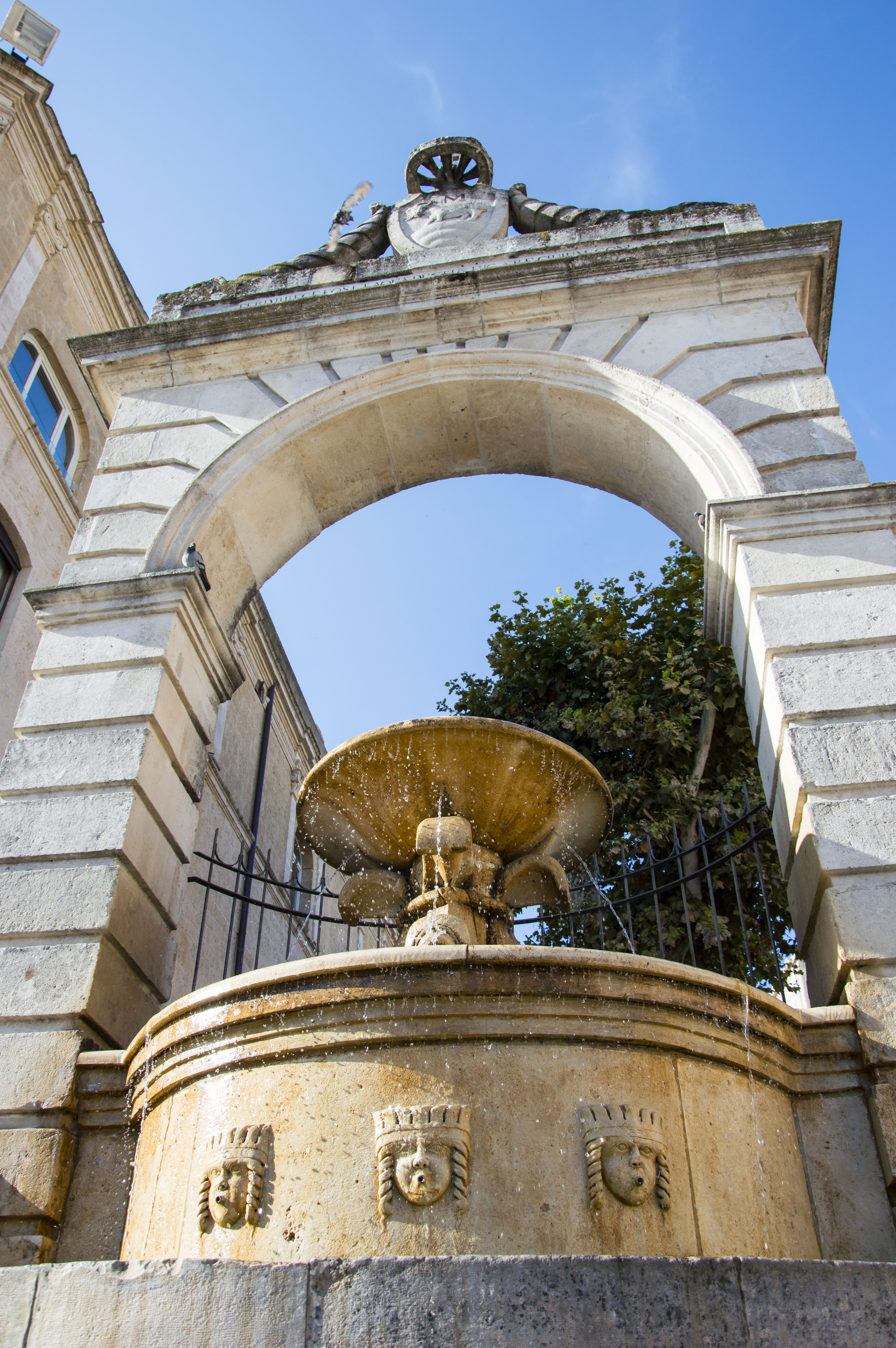
Ferdinandea Fountain

Matera was built above a deep ravine called Gravina of Matera that divides the territory into two areas. Matera was built such that it is hidden, but made it difficult to provide a water supply to its inhabitants. Early dwellers invested tremendous energy in building cisterns and systems of water channels.

The largest cistern has been found under Piazza Vittorio Veneto, the Palombaro Lungo that was built in 1832. With its solid pillars carved from the rock and a vault height of more than fifteen metres, it is navigable by boat. Like other cisterns in the town, it collected rainwater that was filtered and flowed in a controlled way to the Sassi.

There were also a large number of little superficial canals that fed pools and hanging gardens. Moreover, many bell-shaped cisterns in dug houses were filled up by seepage. Later, when the population increased, many of these cisterns were turned into houses and other kinds of water-harvesting systems were realised.

Some of these more recent facilities have the shape of houses submerged in the earth.

=== Natural areas ===
The Murgia National Park (Parco della Murgia Materana), a regional park established in 1990, includes the territory of the Gravina di Matera and about 150 rock churches scattered along the slopes of the ravines and the plateau of the Murgia. This area, inhabited since prehistoric times, still preserves stationing dating back to the Paleolithic, such as the Grotta dei pipistrelli (cave of the bats), and to the Neolithic. The symbol of the park is the lesser kestrel.

The San Giuliano Regional Reserve, a protected area established in 2000, includes Lake San Giuliano, an artificial reservoir created by the damming of the Bradano river, and the river sections upstream and downstream of it.

==== Timmari ====
Colle di Timmari, a green plateau located about 15 km from the city, dominates the Bradano valley and the San Giuliano lake. It is a pleasant residential area, and on the top of the hill there is the small Sanctuary of San Salvatore that dates back to 1310 and an important archaeological area.

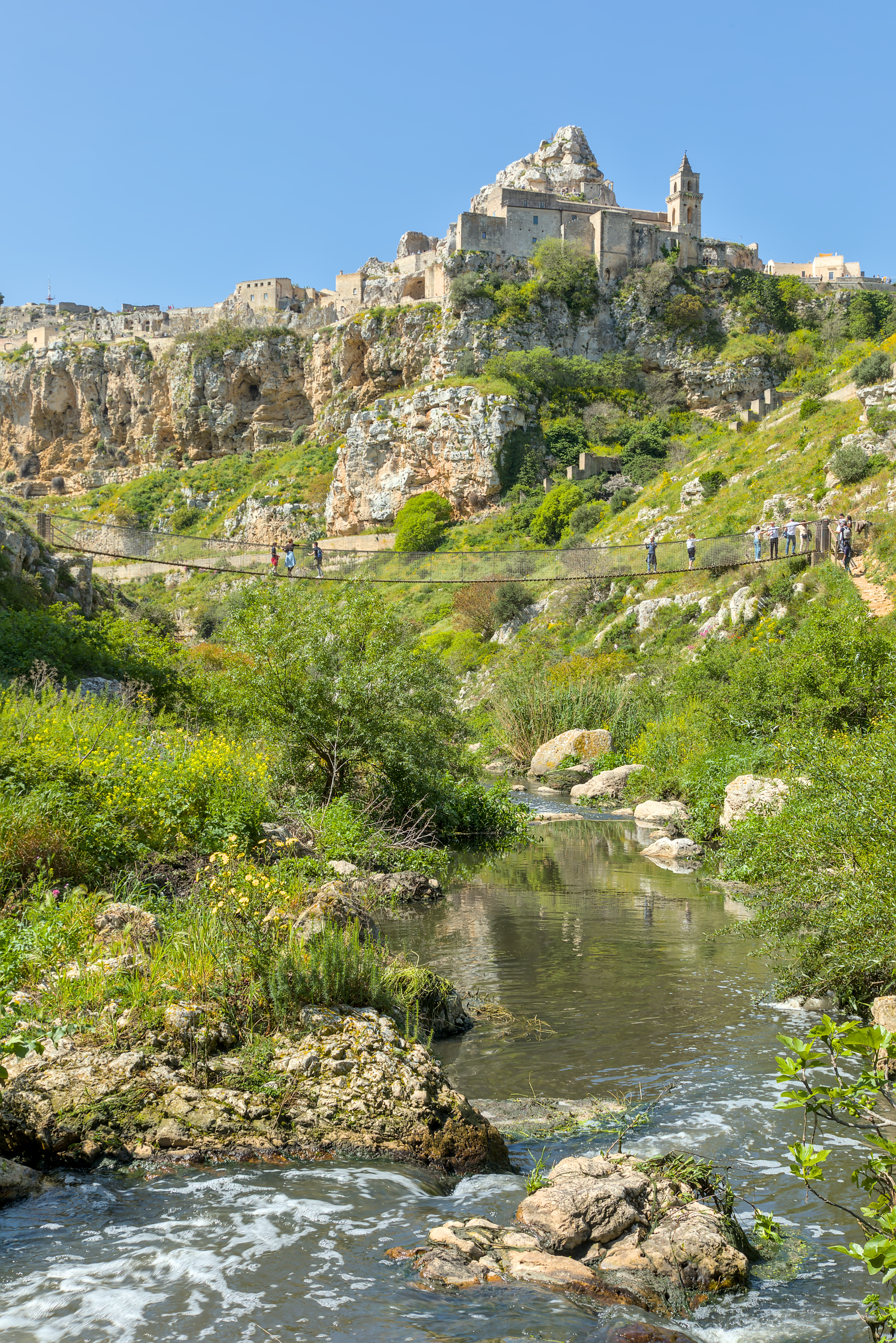
Gravina di Matera

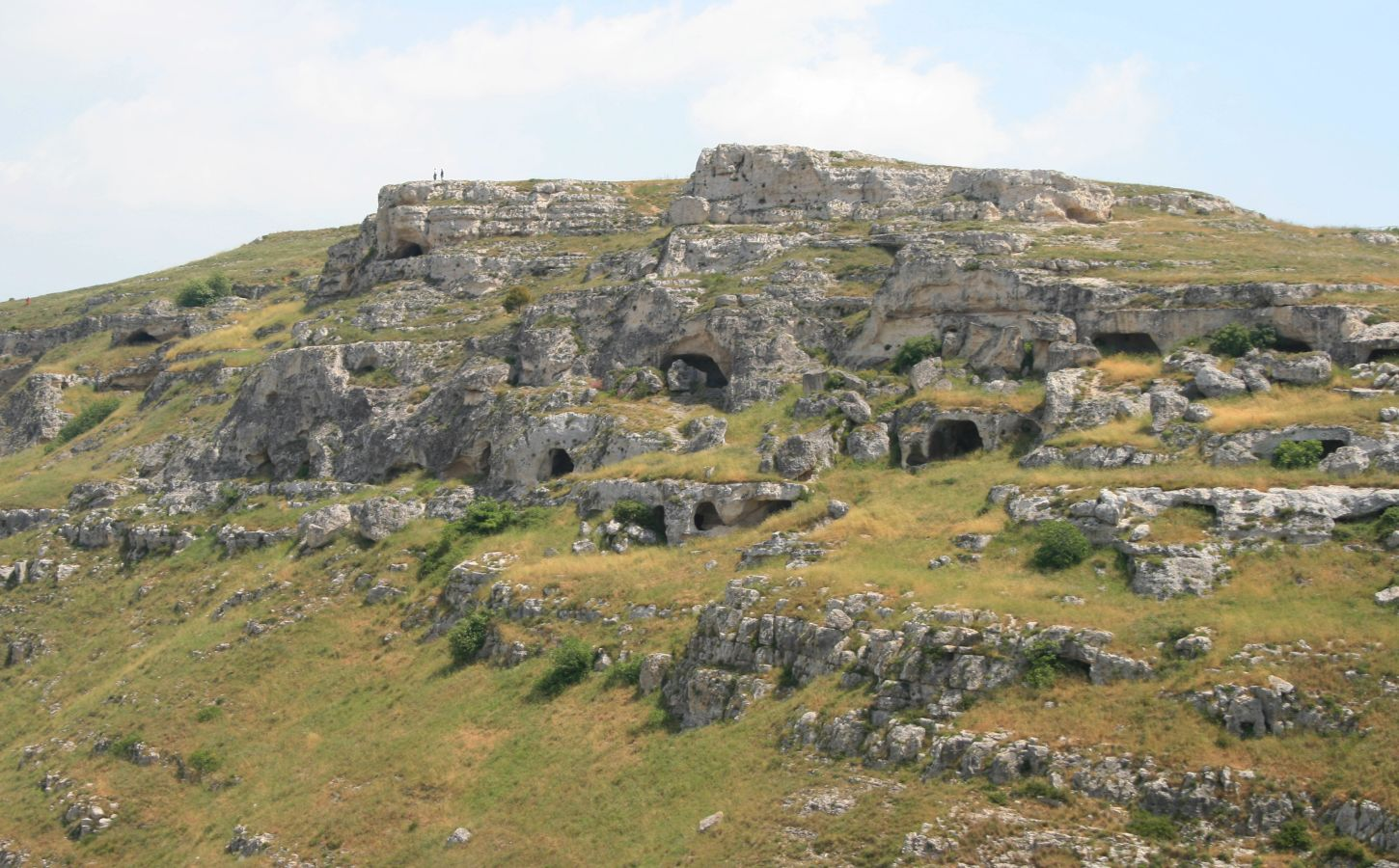
Murgia National Park with prehistoric caves and rupestrian churches

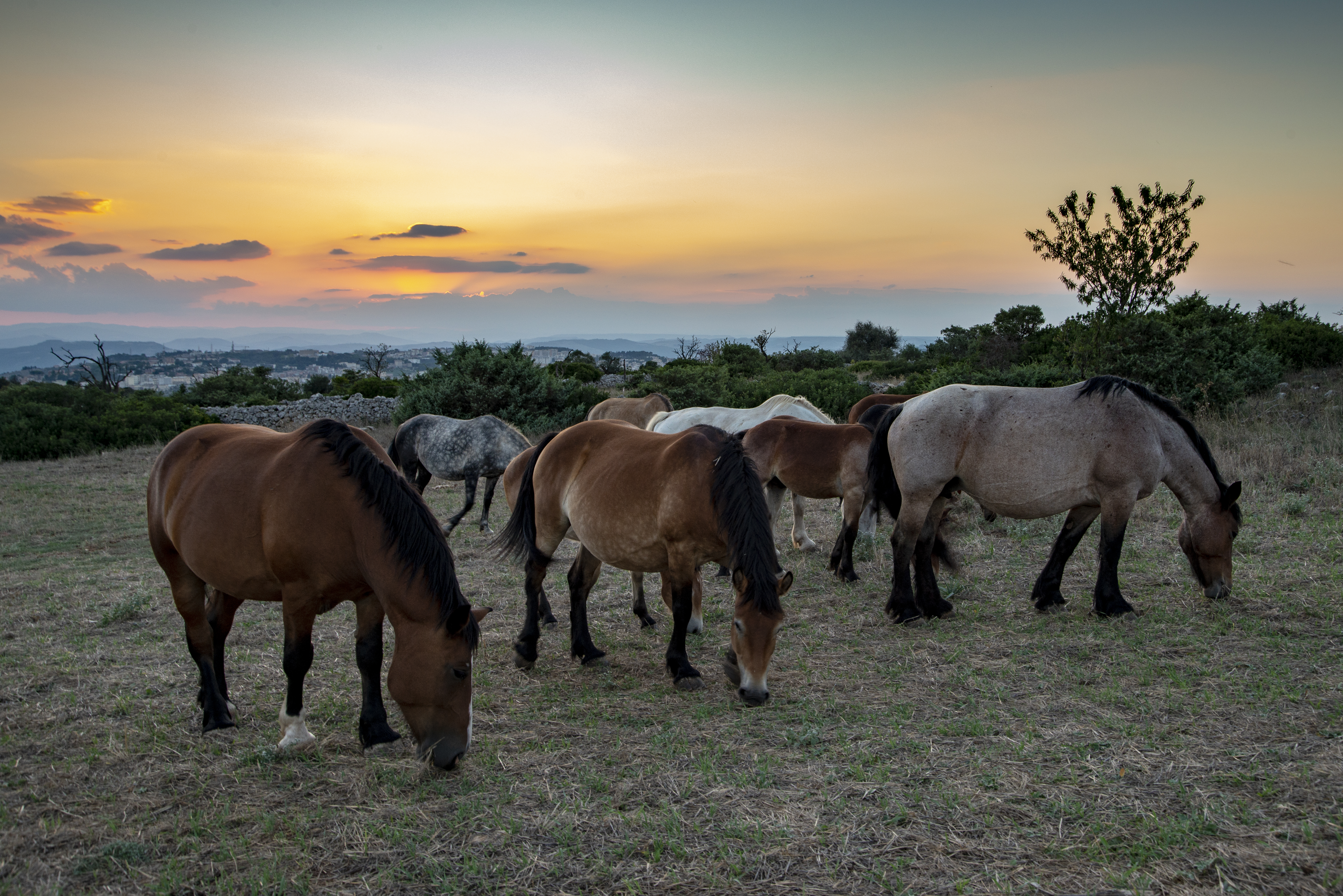
Horses in the Murgia National Park

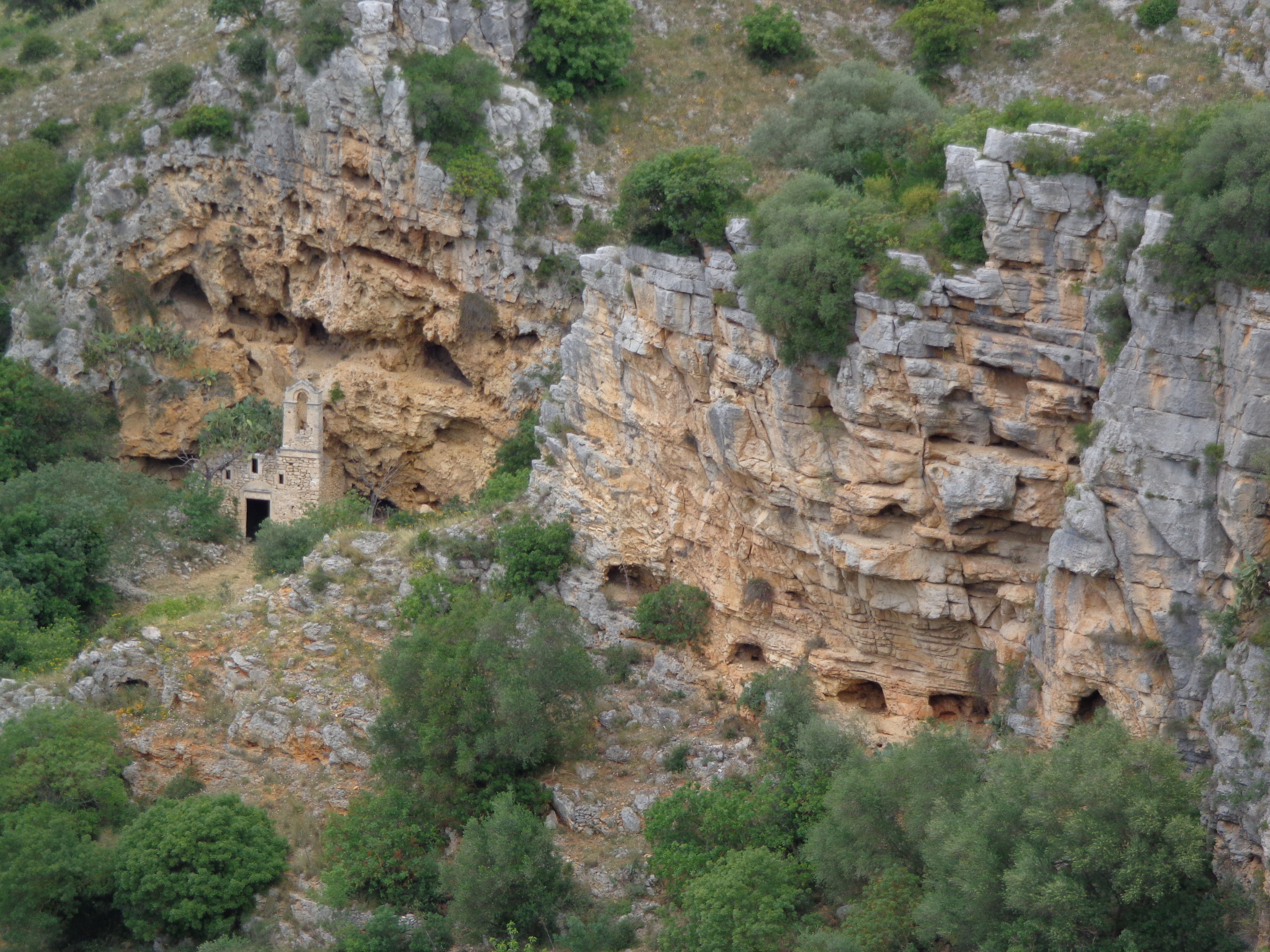

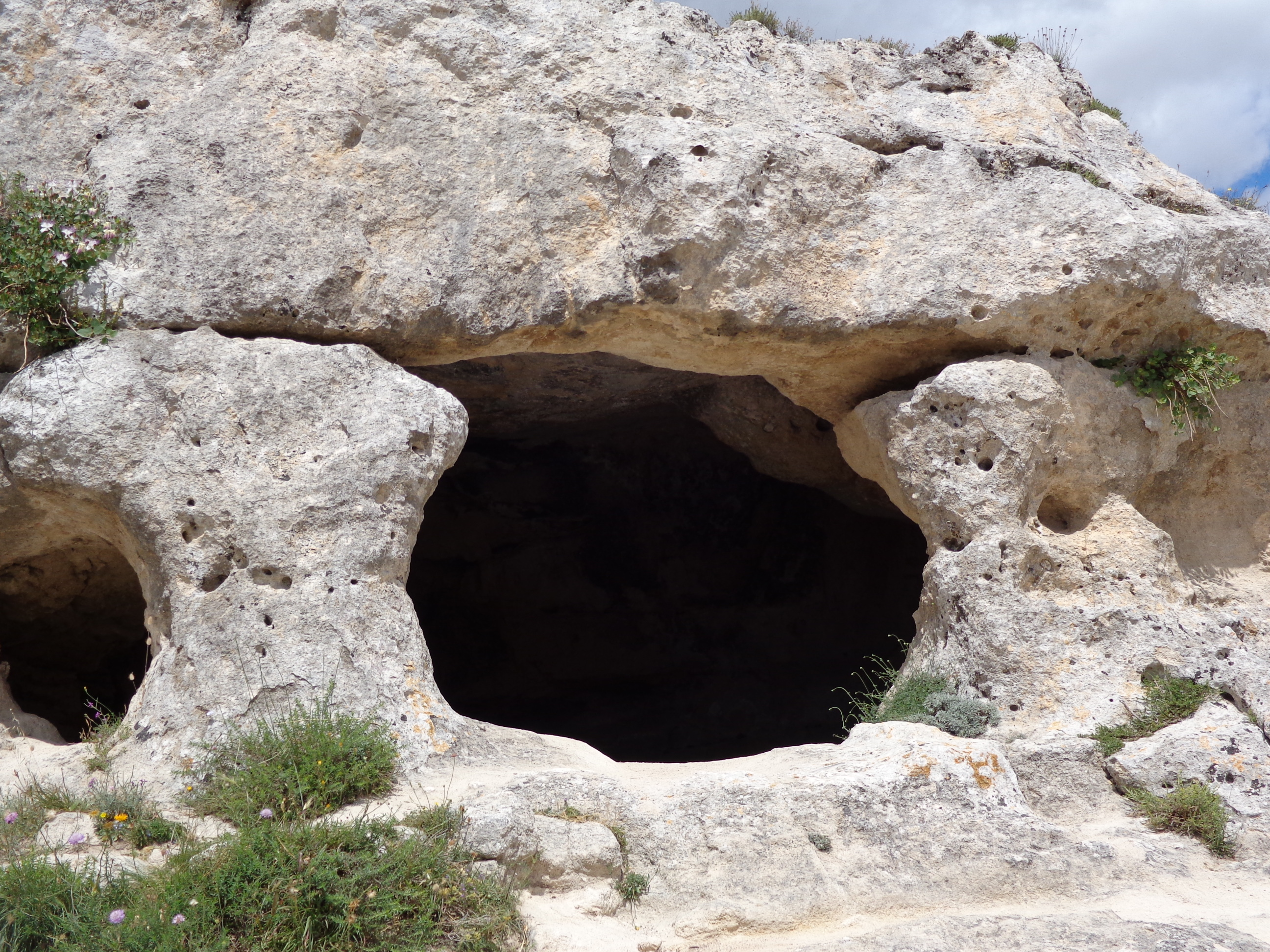

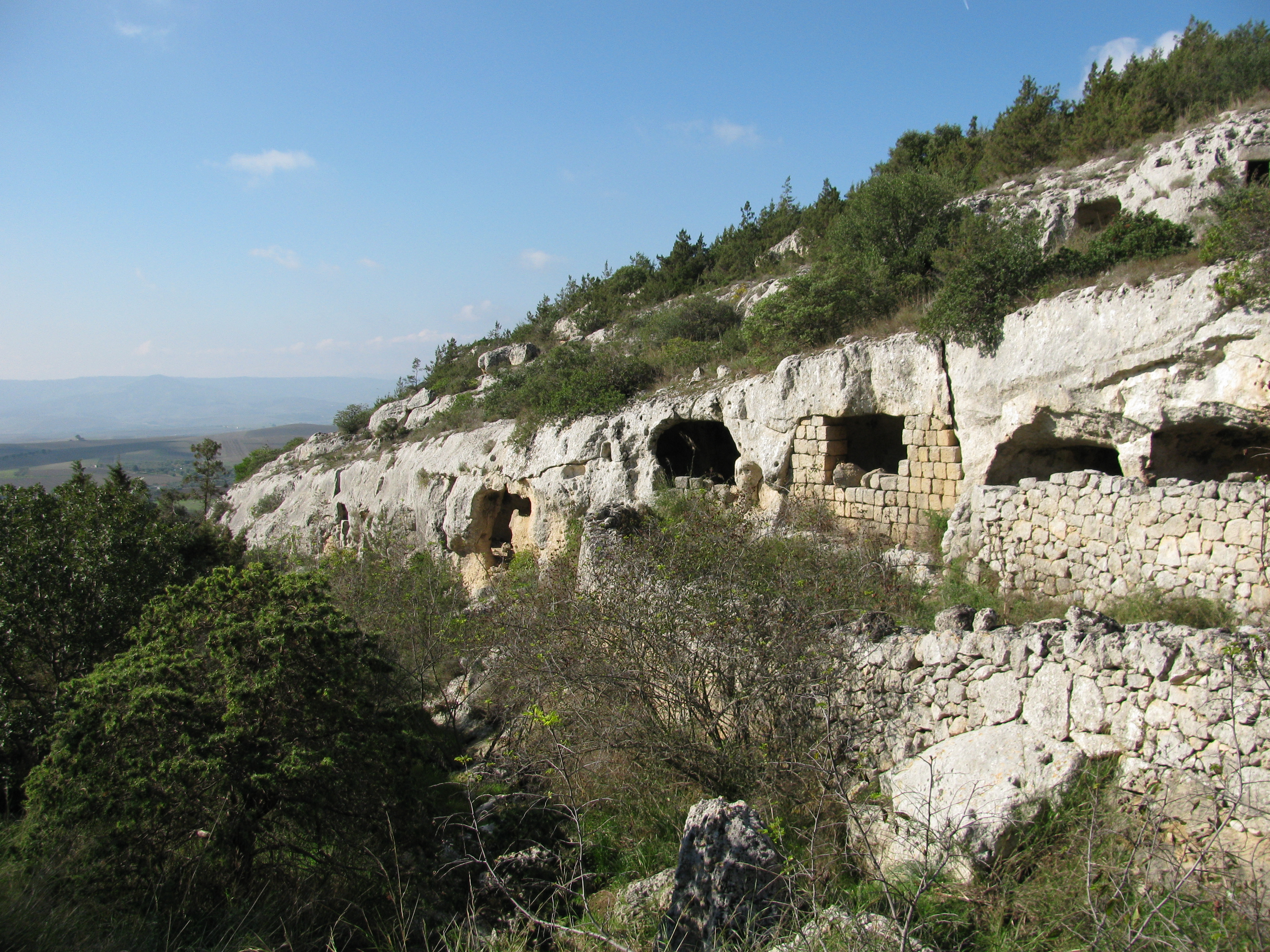
Saracen village

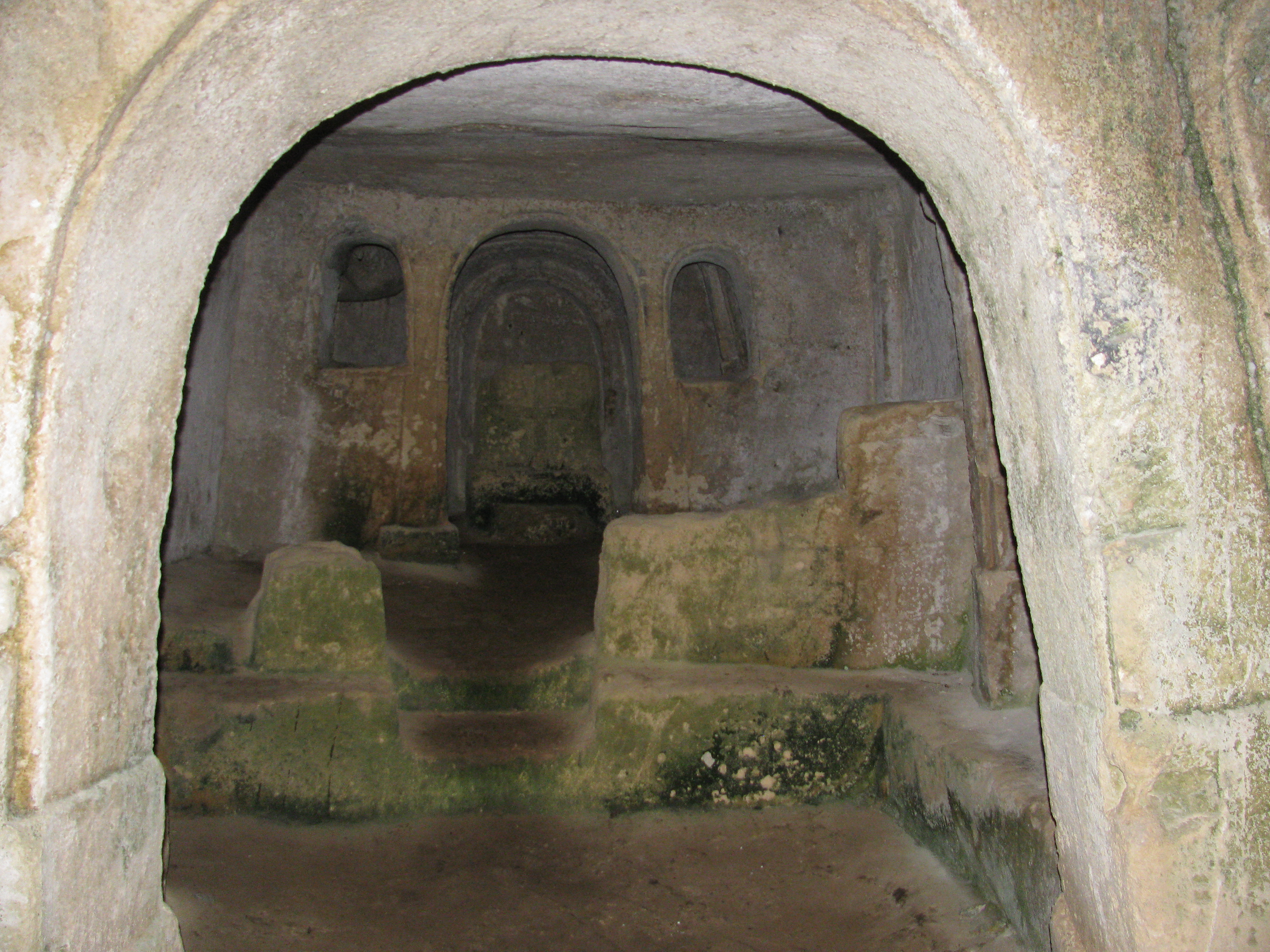
Cave church of San Luca alla Selva

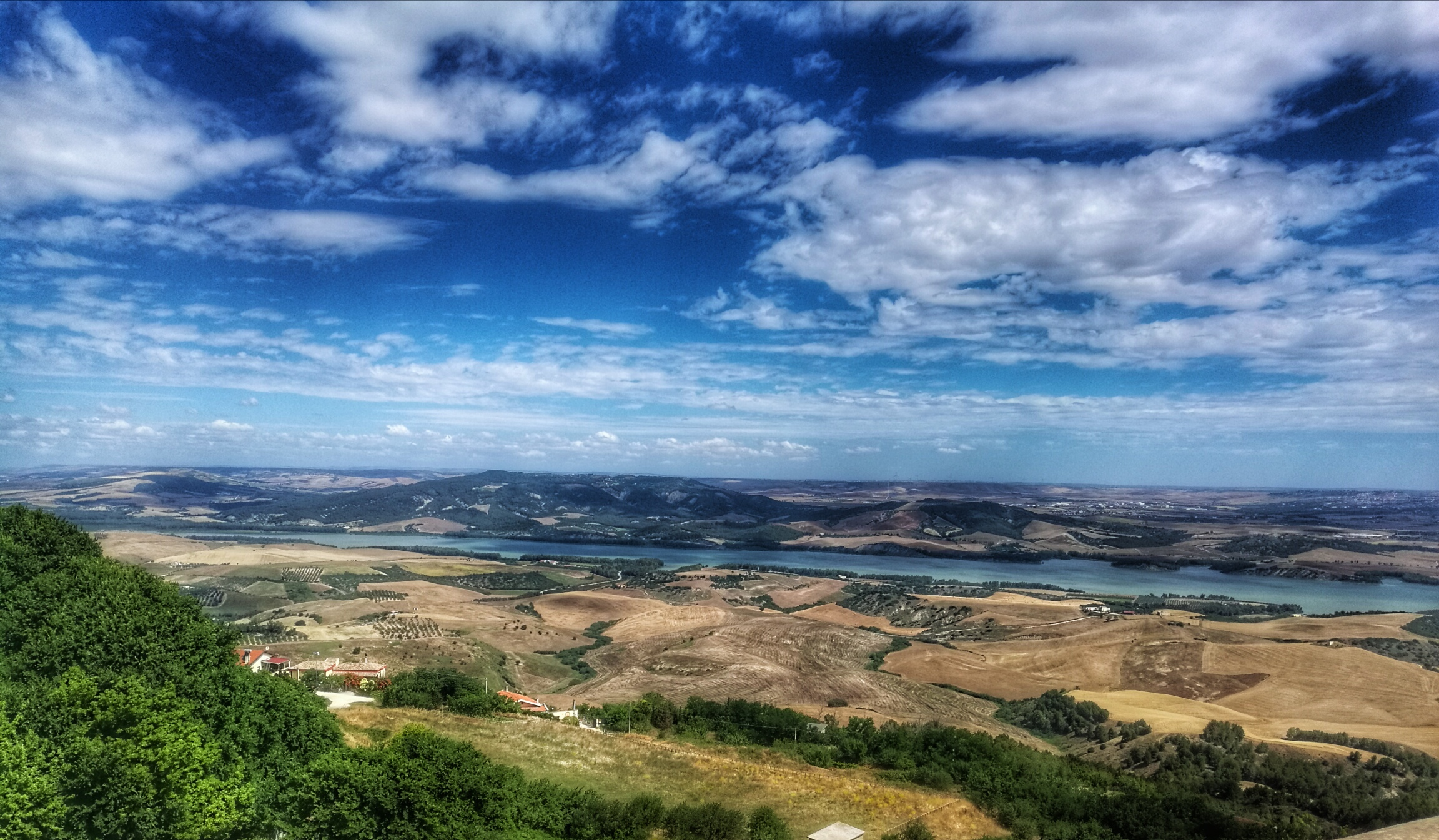
San Giuliano Regional Reserve

=== Other sights ===
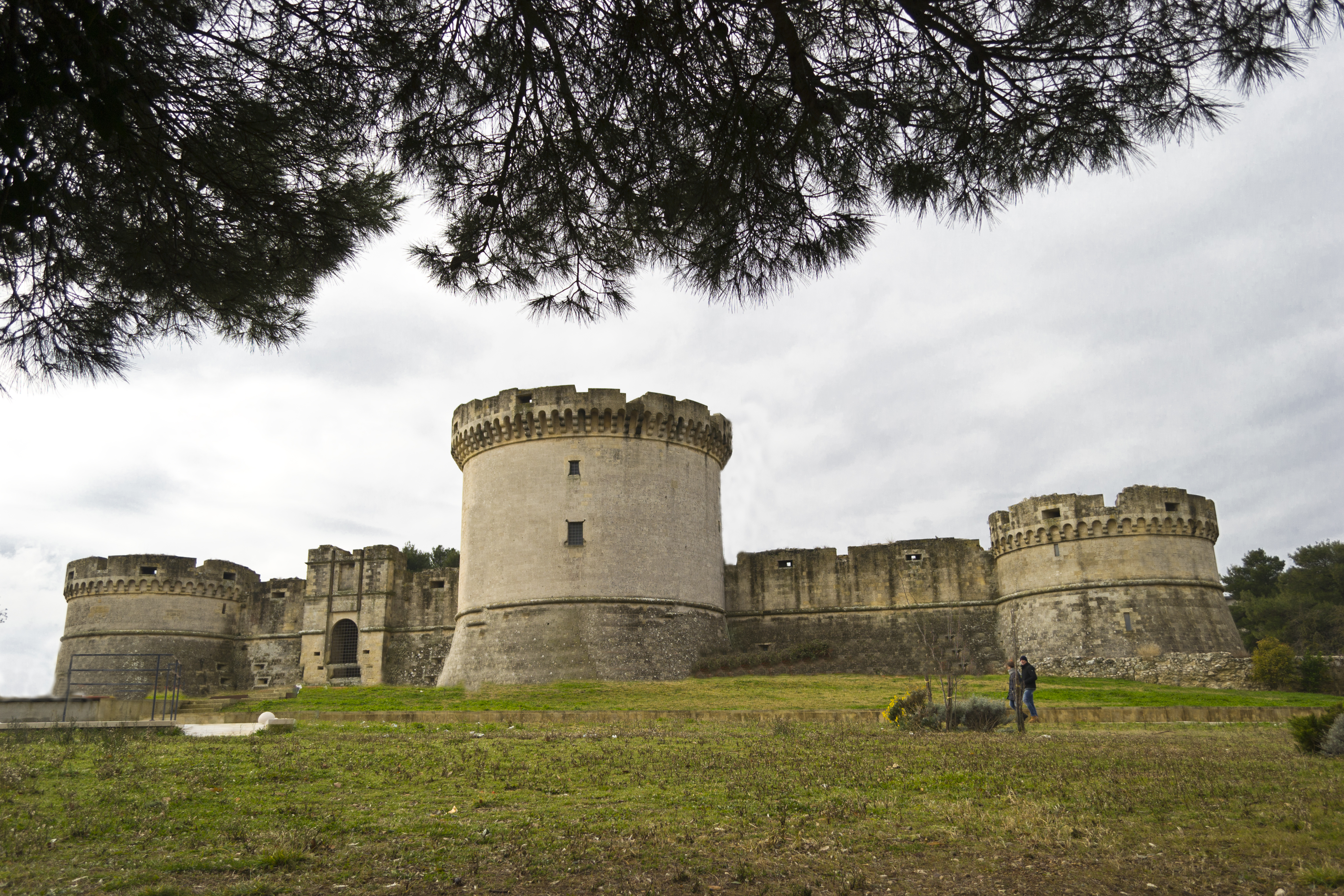
The Tramontano Castle

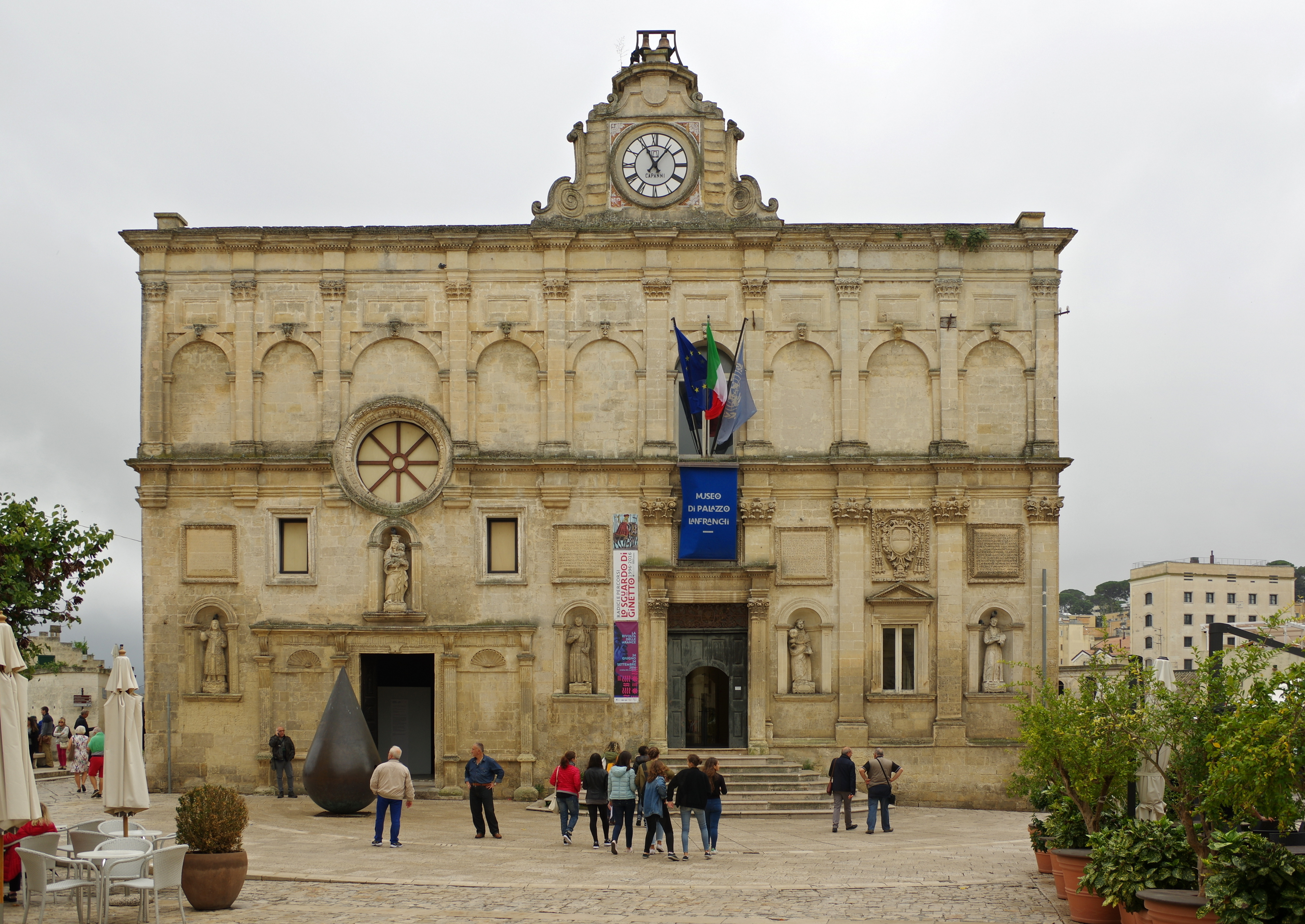
Palazzo Lanfranchi

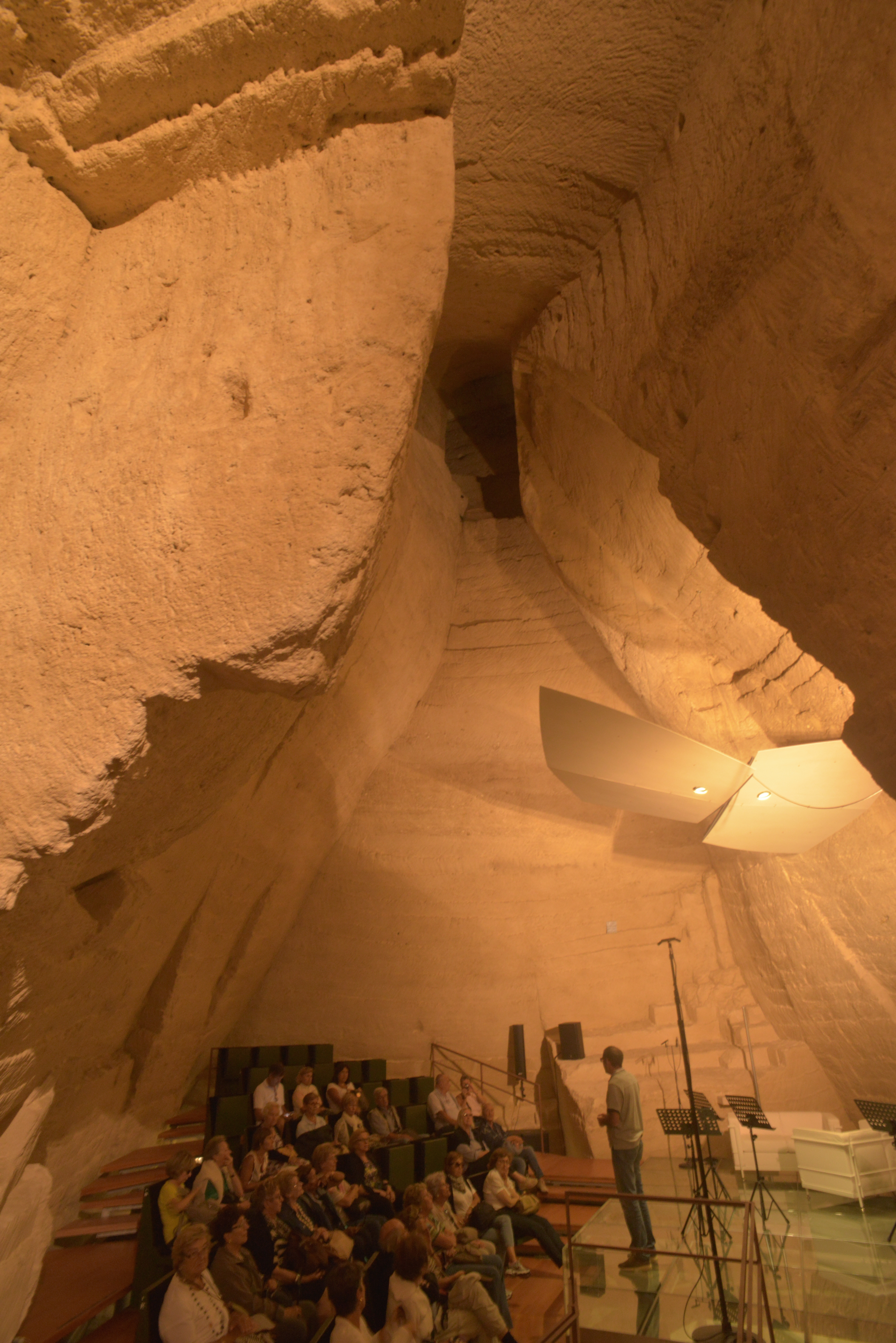
Auditorium of the culture centre Casa Cava

The Tramontano Castle, begun in the early sixteenth century by Gian Carlo Tramontano, Count of Matera, is probably the only other structure that is above ground of any great significance outside the sassi. However, the construction remained unfinished after his assassination in the popular riot of 29 December 1514. It has three large towers, while twelve were probably included in the original design. During some restoration work in the main square of the town, workers came across what were believed to be the main footings of another castle tower. However, on further excavation large Roman cisterns were unearthed. Whole house structures were discovered where one may see how the people of that era lived.

The Palazzo dell'Annunziata is a historical building on the main square, seat of Provincial Library.

== Culture ==
On 17 October 2014, Matera was declared European Capital of Culture for 2019, together with Bulgaria's second-largest city, Plovdiv.

=== Cuisine ===
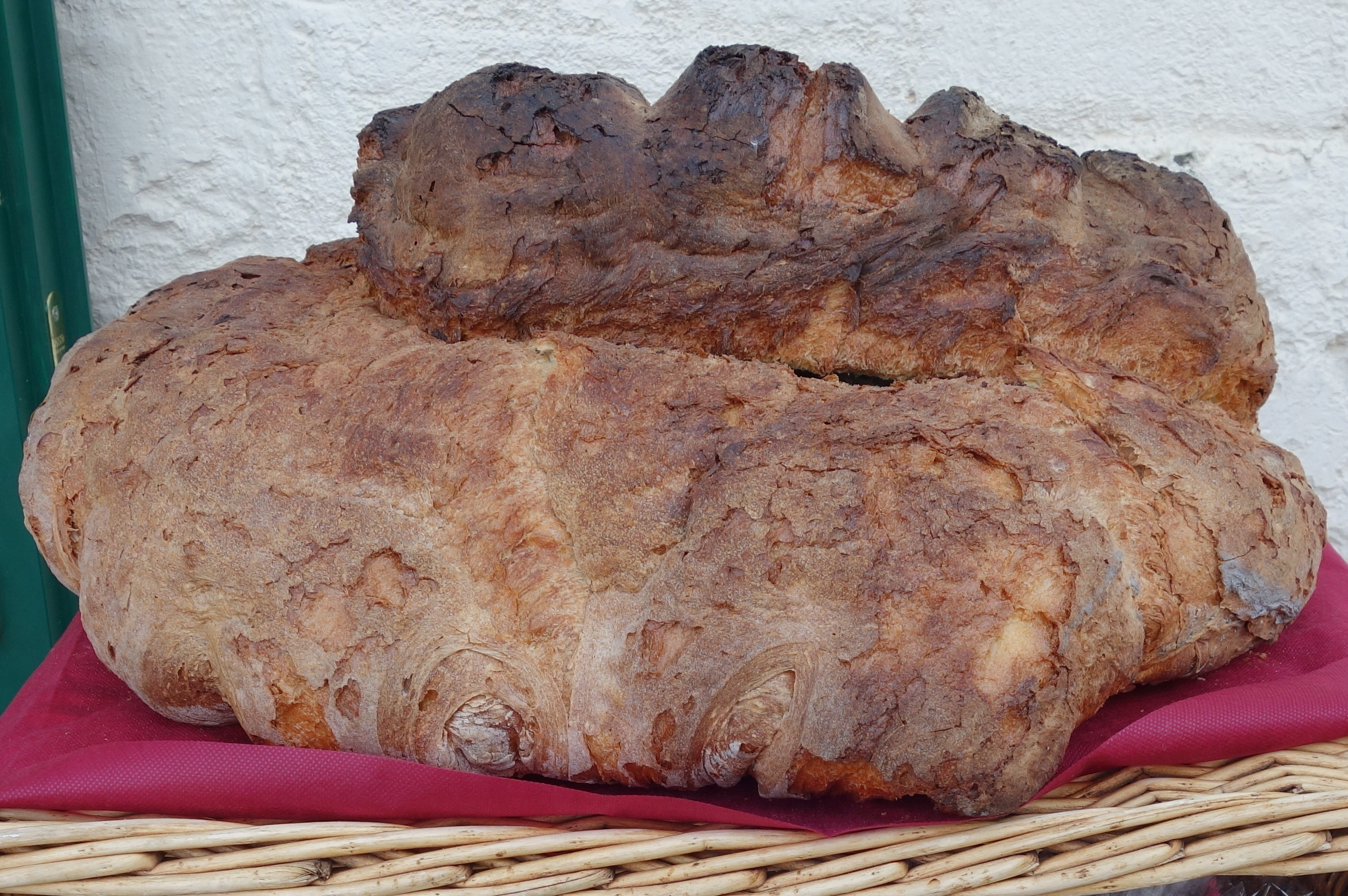
Pane di Matera

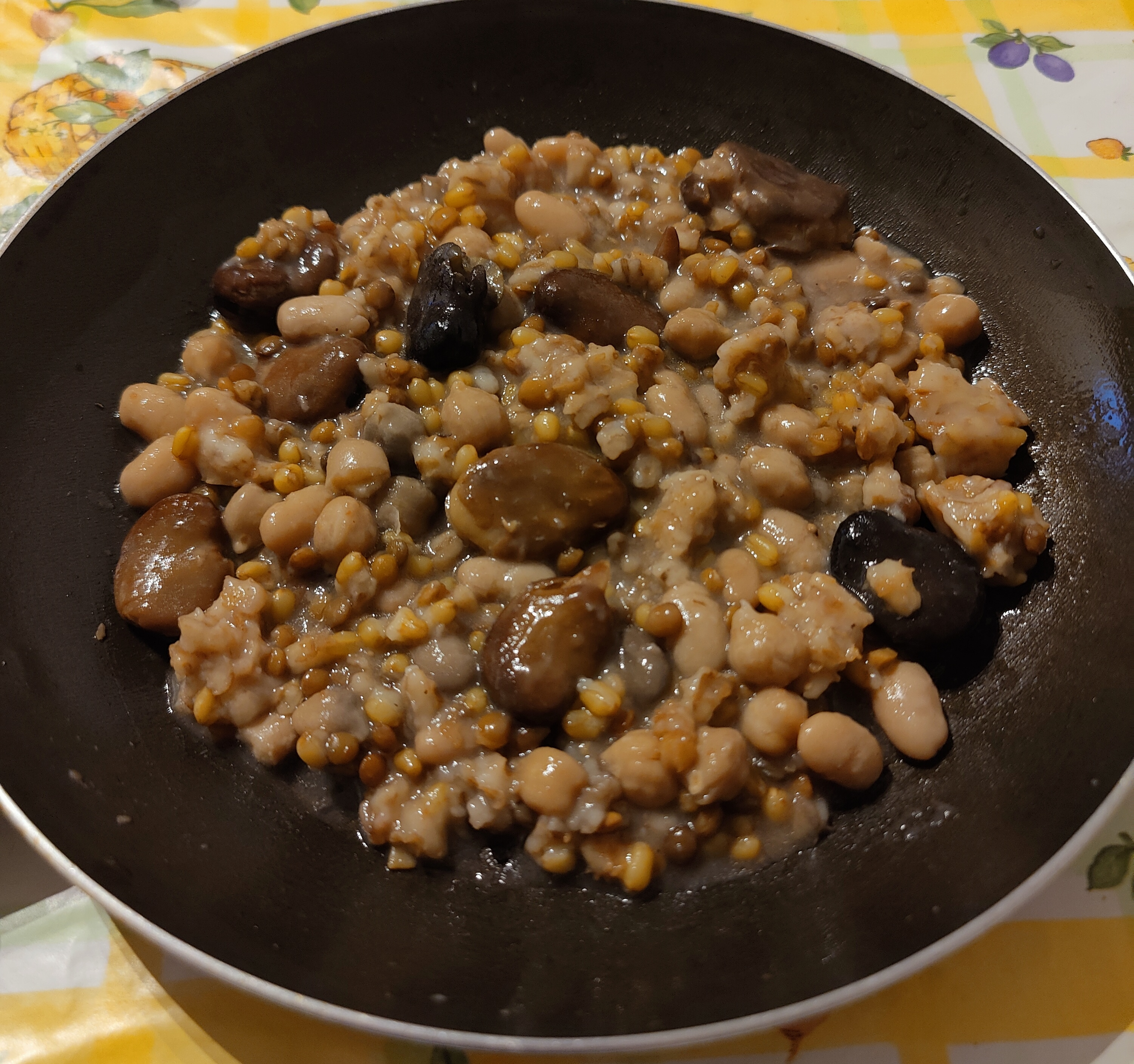
Crapiata

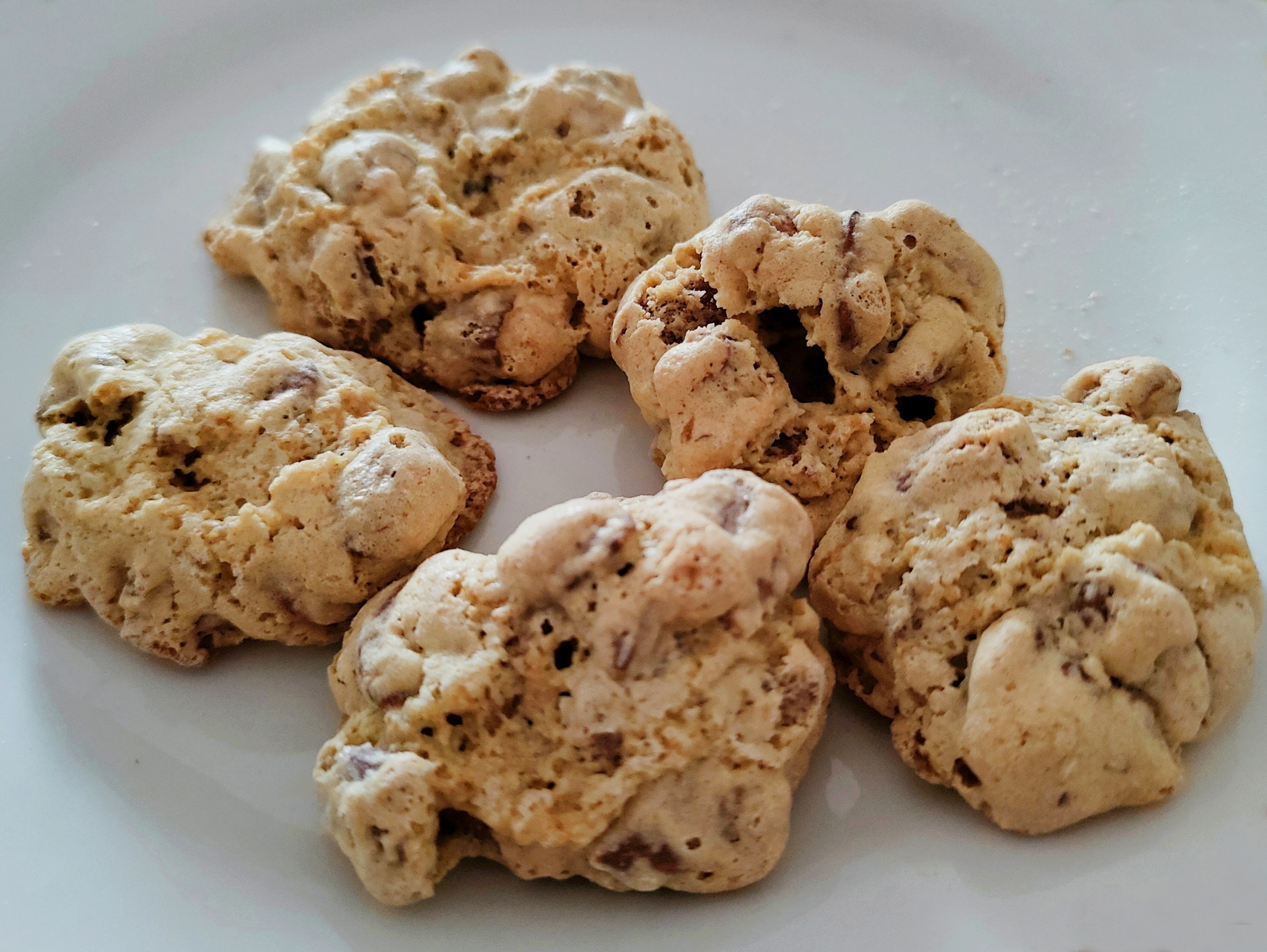
Strazzate

The cuisine of Matera is a typical cucina povera (Italian for 'cuisine of the poor') from Southern Italy. It features a sort of blend of Basilicata and Apulia's cuisines being in a border area between the two regions. Some specialties are "peperoni cruschi", a sweet and dry pepper variety very popular in Basilicata, and "Pane di Matera", a type of bread recognizable for its intense flavour and conical shape, granted Protected Geographical Indication (PGI) status. Matera produces an eponymous wine which bears the Denominazione di origine controllata (DOC) designation.

Some dishes from the local cuisine include:

- Crapiata, a peasant soup with chickpeas, beans, broad beans, wheat, lentils, cicerchie. An old recipe dating to the Roman period, later enriched with other ingredients such as potatoes, it is a common ritual grown into "Sassi di Matera" and celebrated on 1 August
- Orecchiette alla materana, baked orecchiette-pasta seasoned with tomatoes, lamb, mozzarella cheese, and Pecorino cheese
- Pasta con i peperoni cruschi, a pasta dish with peperoni cruschi and fried breadcrumb. Grated cheese or turnip greens may be added.
- Cialedda, a frugal recipe with stale bread as a main ingredient. It may be "calda" (hot) with egg, bay leaves, garlic, and olives or "fredda" (cold) with tomatoes and garlic.
- Pignata, sheep meat with potatoes, onion, tomatoes, and celery cooked in the "pignata", a terracotta pot shaped like an amphora.
- Strazzate, crumbly biscuits prepared with egg, almonds, and coffee

=== Cinema ===
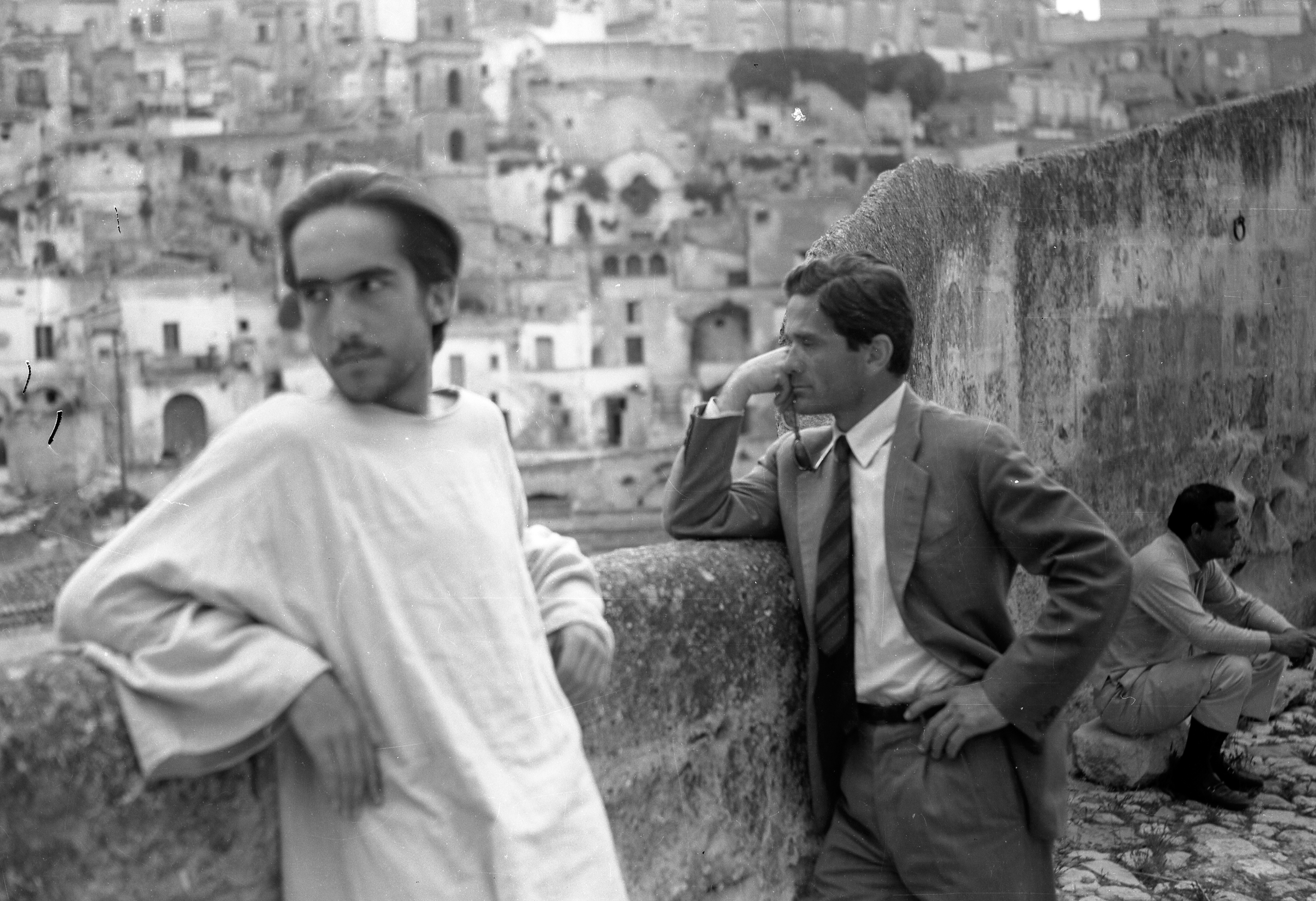
Enrique Irazoqui and Pier Paolo Pasolini in Matera, on the set of The Gospel According to St. Matthew, 1964

Matera is a popular filming location. It is often labeled as the "Little Jerusalem" by filmmakers, being the setting for religious-themed films including The Gospel According to St. Matthew (1964), King David (1985), The Passion of the Christ (2004), Mary (2005), The Nativity Story (2006), The Omen (2006). Its surrounding landscape which evokes an archaic and isolated world has been immortalized in films such as La lupa (1953), The Demon (1963), Christ Stopped at Eboli (1979). Matera is also the setting for action/adventure movies such as Wonder Woman (2017) and No Time to Die (2021). Since the late 2010s the city has also attracted Bollywood productions like War (2019) and Salaar (2023).

=== Music ===
Matera also appears in several music videos, Robin Schulz's Sun Goes Down (2014) and Metallica's Spit Out the Bone (2016) among the others.

=== Religious traditions ===
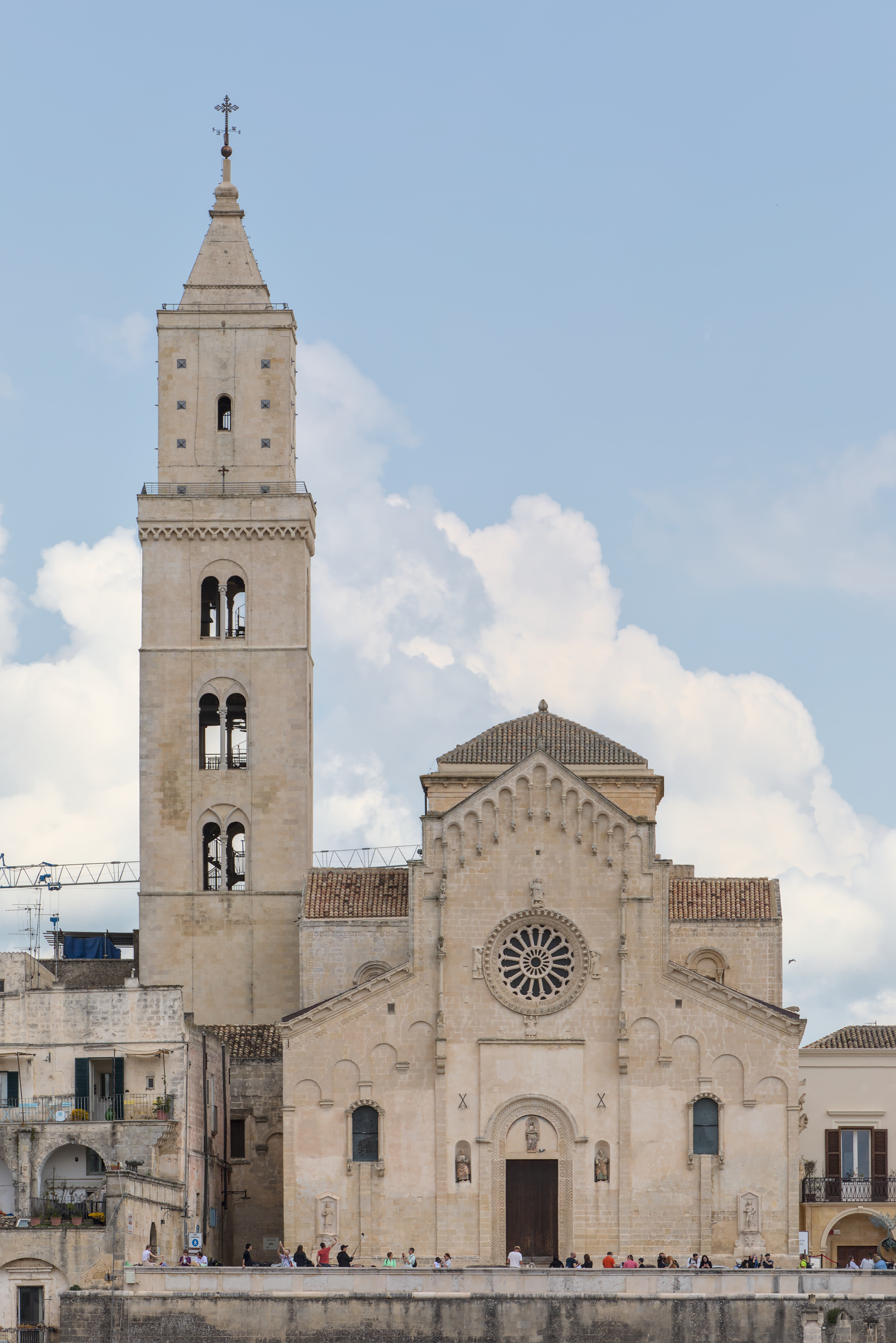
Matera Cathedral

The Feast of the Madonna della Bruna, held in Matera on 2 July each year, is notable for its religious procession featuring an ornamented chariot that will be pulled apart by spectators. The origins of the festival are not well known, because its story has changed while being handed down from generation to generation. One of these legends says that a woman asked a farmer to go up on his wagon to accompany her to Matera. When she arrived to the periphery of the city, she got off the wagon and asked farmer to take her message to the bishop. In this message she said she was Christ's mother. The bishop, the clergy, and the folk rushed to receive the Virgin, but they found a statue. So the statue of Madonna entered in the city on a triumphal wagon. Another legend talks about a destruction of the wagon: Saracens besiege Matera and the citizens, to protect the painting of Madonna, hid it on a little wagon. They then destroyed the wagon to keep the Saracens from taking the painting.

Different hypotheses are attributed to the name of Madonna della Bruna: the first says that the noun derives from the Lombard high-medieval term brùnja (armor/protection of knights). So the name might mean Madonna of defense. Another hypothesis is that the name comes from herbon, a city of Giudea, where the Virgin went to visit her cousin Elisabetta. A third hypothesis says that the name comes from the colour of the Virgin's face. The profane insertions such as the navalis wagon and its violent destruction, along with the intimacy and the religious solemnity, suggest this festival shares roots with ancient traditions of other Mediterranean countries. For example, in Greek culture, wedding parties also celebrate with a triumphal wagon (ships on wheels richly designed). The Madonna's sculpture is located in a case in the transept of the cathedral dedicated to her, where there is also a fresco that portrays her. It dates back to the thirteenth century and it belongs to the Byzantine school.

== Notable people ==
- Franco Selvaggi (1953), Football Serie A player, Italy National Team player and World Cup 1982 winner
- Luigi De Canio (1957), football manager
- Cristiana De Filippis (1992), mathematician
- Egidio Romualdo Duni (1708–1775), composer
- Emanuele Gaudiano (1986), show jumping rider
- Cosimo Fusco (1962), actor
- John of Matera (1070–1139), Benedictine monk and saint
- Enzo Masiello (1969), Paralympic athlete
- Antonio Persio (1542–1612), philosopher
- Tommaso Stigliani (1573–1651), poet and writer
- Giovanni Carlo Tramontano (1451–1514), nobleman

== Transportation ==
Matera is the terminal station of the Bari–Matera, a narrow gauge railroad managed by Ferrovie Appulo Lucane. The nearest airport is Bari Airport. Matera is connected to the A14 Bologna-Taranto motorway through the SS99 national road. It is also served by the SS407, SS665 and SS106 national road.

Bus connection to Italy's main cities is provided by private firms.

== Sport ==
- FC Matera
- Olimpia Matera, a basketball team

== Twin towns – sister cities ==
Matera is twinned with:

- Oulu, Finland
- Petra, Jordan
- Toms River, United States

== See also ==
- Church of San Leonardo (Matera)
- Matera Centrale railway station
- Sassi di Matera
