= List of lakes of Italy =

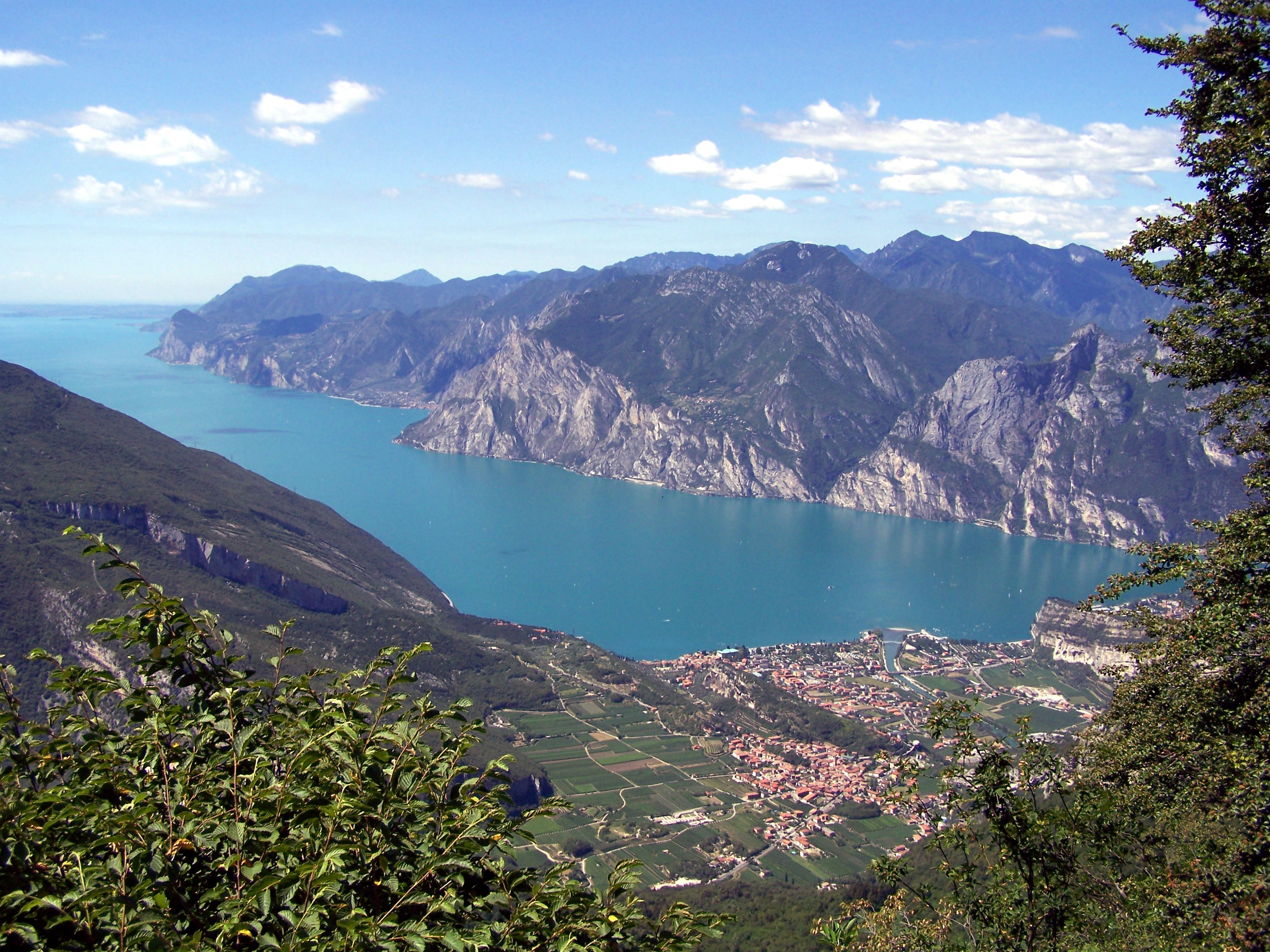
Lake Garda, the largest lake of Italy

The following is a list of lakes of Italy. The lakes of Italy can be distinguished, depending on their location within the national territory, between pre-alpine, north-western, Apennine, Sicilian and Sardinian, in addition to lagoons and coastal lakes. They are generally named after the surrounding towns and often their capacity has been increased with the construction of dams, in order to create large water reserves to be used for the production of electricity. There are more than 1000 lakes in Italy, the largest of which is Garda (370 km^{2} or 143 sq mi).

The pre-alpine lakes are the largest and most important because they constitute capacious basins, in which the alpine rivers restrain their impetus and purify their waters, depositing the transported materials. They also affect the local climate, mitigating it. Their waters fill the bottom of long valleys that flow into the Po Valley. They are deep valleys, carved by glaciers, which once descended to the foot of the Alpine chain. Generally, their emissary rivers then flow into the Po River.

There are also lakes along the Italian coasts. They were formed by the wave motion of the sea, which, first of all in the inlets, accumulated sandy shores and dune strings, which closed the waters behind. In this way, the old marine inlets have been transformed into lakes.

== Lakes with an area >10 km^{2} (3.9 sq mi) ==
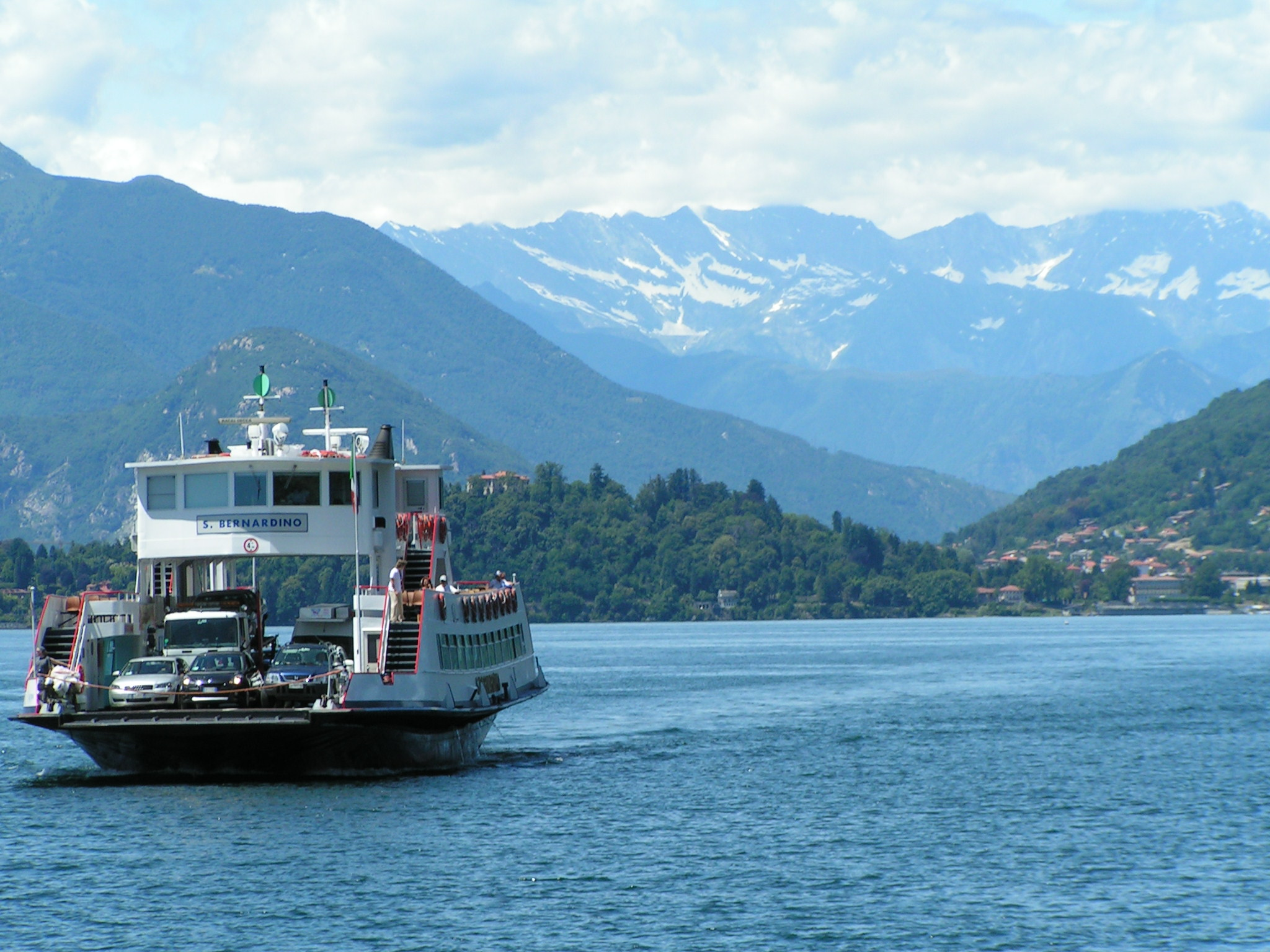
Lake Maggiore

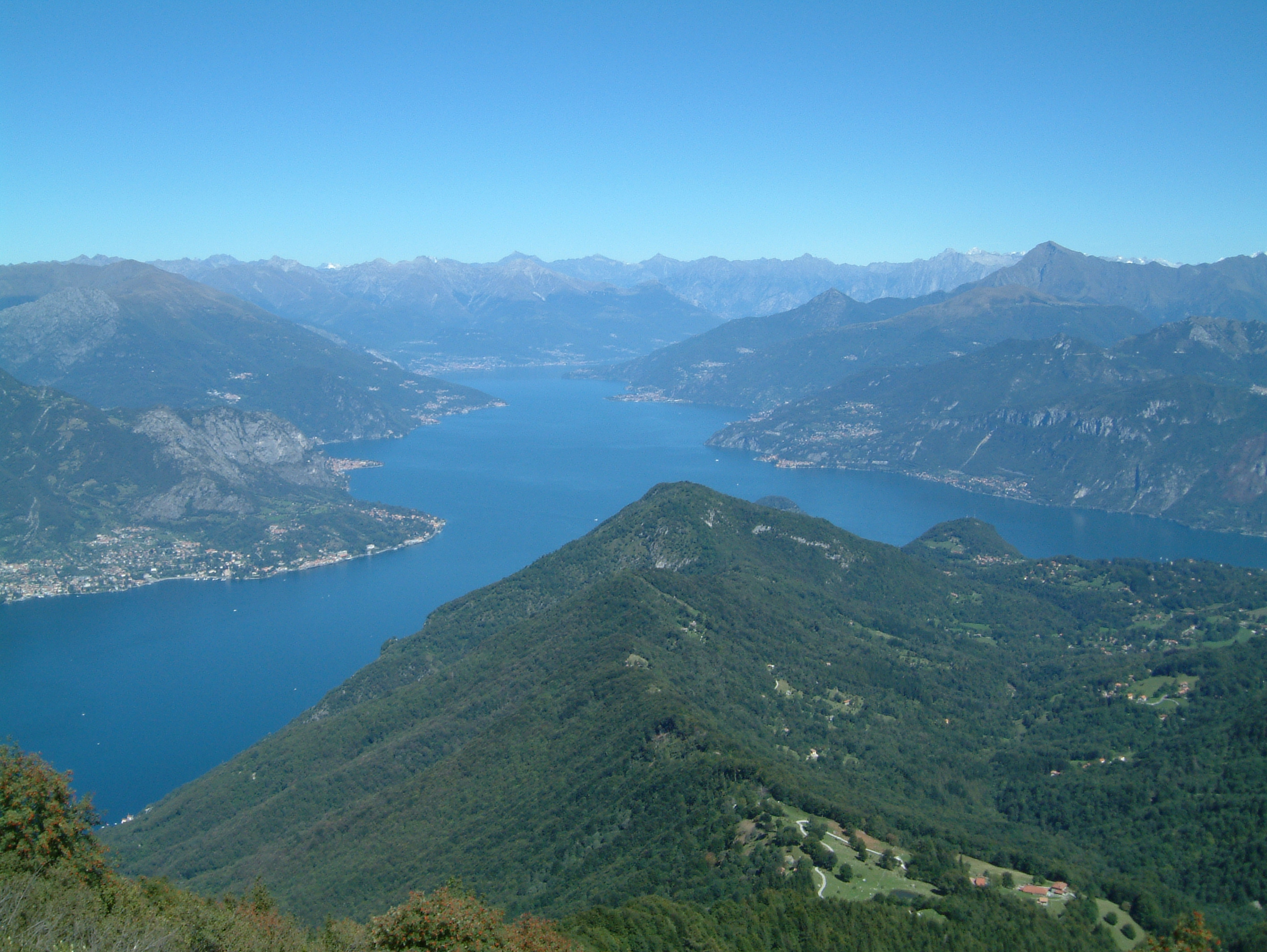
Lake Como

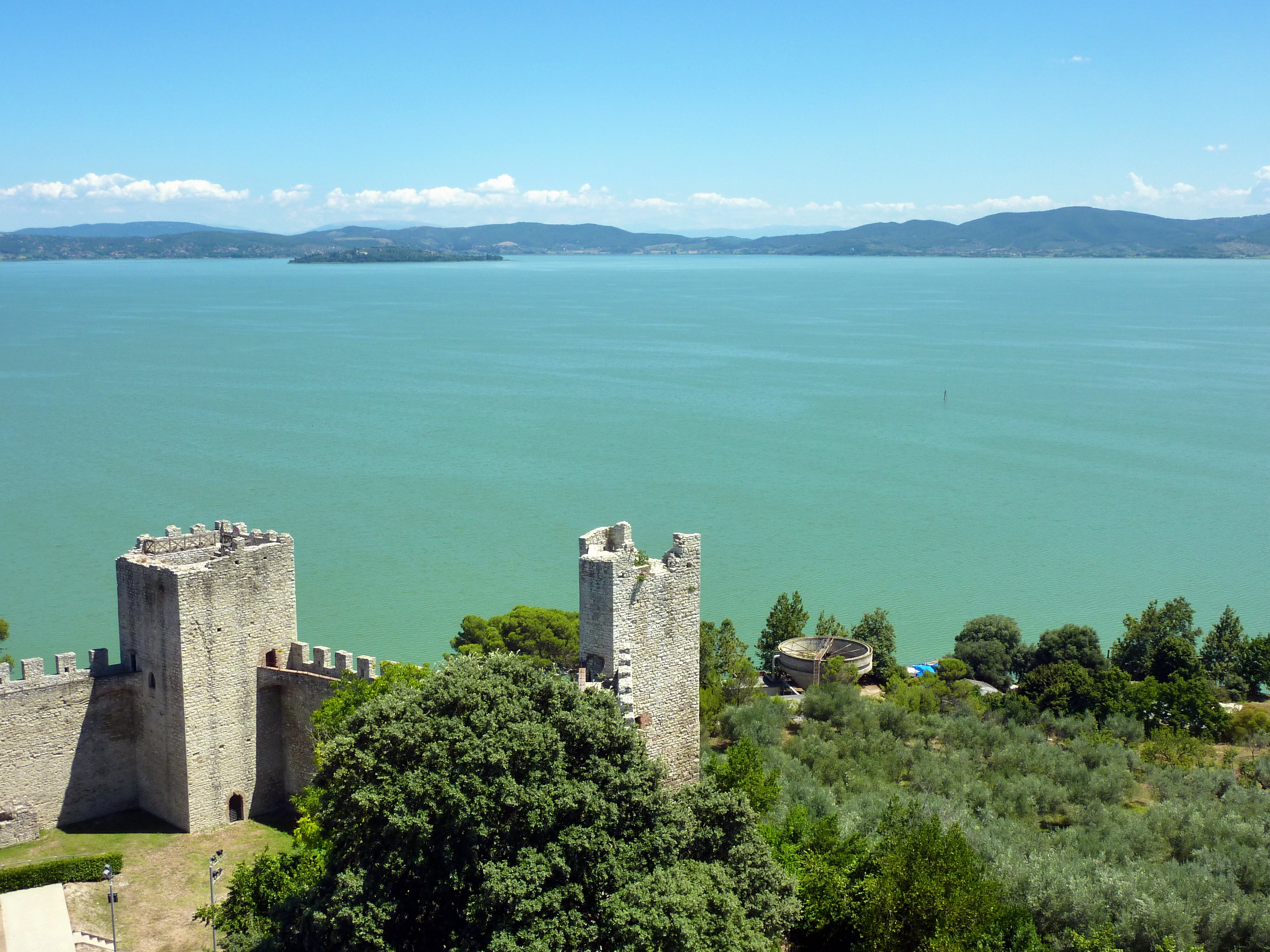
Lake Trasimeno

Lake	Region	Area	Elevation	Maximum depth
Lake Garda (Lago di Garda)	Lombardy, Trentino/South Tyrol, Veneto	370 km^{2} (143 sq mi)	65 m (213 ft)	346 m (1,135 ft)
Lake Maggiore (Lago Maggiore)	Lombardy, Piedmont, Ticino (Switzerland)	210 km^{2} (81 sq mi)	194 m (636 ft)	372 m (1,220 ft)
Lake Como (Lago di Como)	Lombardy	146 km^{2} (56 sq mi)	198 m (650 ft)	410 m (1,350 ft)
Lake Trasimeno (Lago Trasimeno)	Umbria	124 km^{2} (48 sq mi)	257 m (843 ft)	7 m (23 ft)
Lake Bolsena (Lago di Bolsena)	Lazio	114 km^{2} (44 sq mi)	305 m (1,001 ft)	151 m (495 ft)
Lake Iseo (Lago d'Iseo)	Lombardy	65.3 km^{2} (25.2 sq mi)	186 m (610 ft)	251 m (823 ft)
Lake Bracciano (Lago di Bracciano)	Lazio	56.7 km^{2} (21.9 sq mi)	160 m (520 ft)	165 m (541 ft)
Lake Lugano (Lago di Lugano)	Lombardy, Ticino (Switzerland)	48.7 km^{2} (18.8 sq mi)	271 m (889 ft)	288 m (945 ft)
Lake Omodeo (Lago Omodeo)	Sardinia	29 km^{2} (11 sq mi)	118 m (387 ft)	59.55 m (195.4 ft)
Lake Orta (Lago d'Orta)	Piedmont	18.2 km^{2} (7.0 sq mi)	290 m (950 ft)	144 m (472 ft)
Lake Coghinas (Lago Coghinas)	Sardinia	17.8 km^{2} (6.9 sq mi)	164 m (538 ft)	50 m (160 ft)
Lake Varese (Lago di Varese)	Lombardy	14.9 km^{2} (5.8 sq mi)	238 m (781 ft)	26 m (85 ft)
Lake Vico (Lago di Vico)	Lazio	12.1 km^{2} (4.7 sq mi)	510 m (1,670 ft)	48.5 m (159 ft)
Lake Idro (Lago d'Idro)	Lombardy	10.9 km^{2} (4.2 sq mi)	368 m (1,207 ft)	122 m (400 ft)

== Alphabetical ==
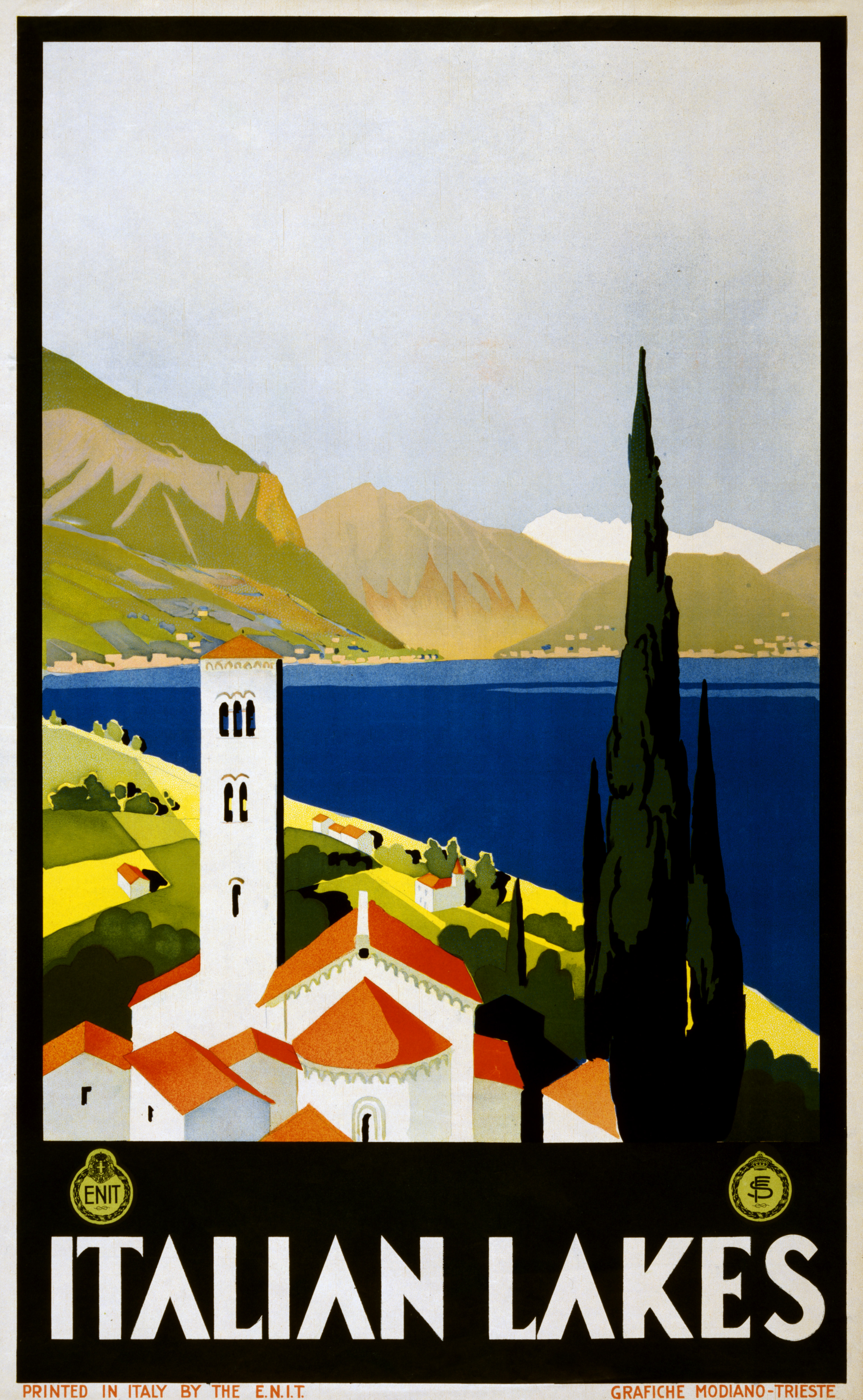
1930s travel poster advertising lakes of Italy

=== A ===
- Lake Accesa (Lago dell'Accesa)
- Lake Acerenza (Lago di Acerenza)
- Acquato Lake (Lago Acquato)
- Agnel Lake (Lago Agnel)
- Lake Albano (Lago Albano)
- Alserio Lake (Lago di Alserio)
- Lake Alto del Flumendosa (Lago Alto del Flumendosa)
- Lake of Ampola (Lago d'Ampola)
- Lake Ampollino (Lago Ampollino)
- Lago dell'Ancipa
- Angitola Lake (Lago dell'Angitola)
- Lago di Annone
- Lago di Anterselva
- Lago Arancio
- Lago di Ariamacina
- Lake of Arno (Lago d'Arno)
- Lago Arvo
- Lake Avernus (Lago d'Averno)
- Aviasco lake (Lago di Aviasco)
- Avigliana Lakes (Laghi di Avigliana)

=== B ===
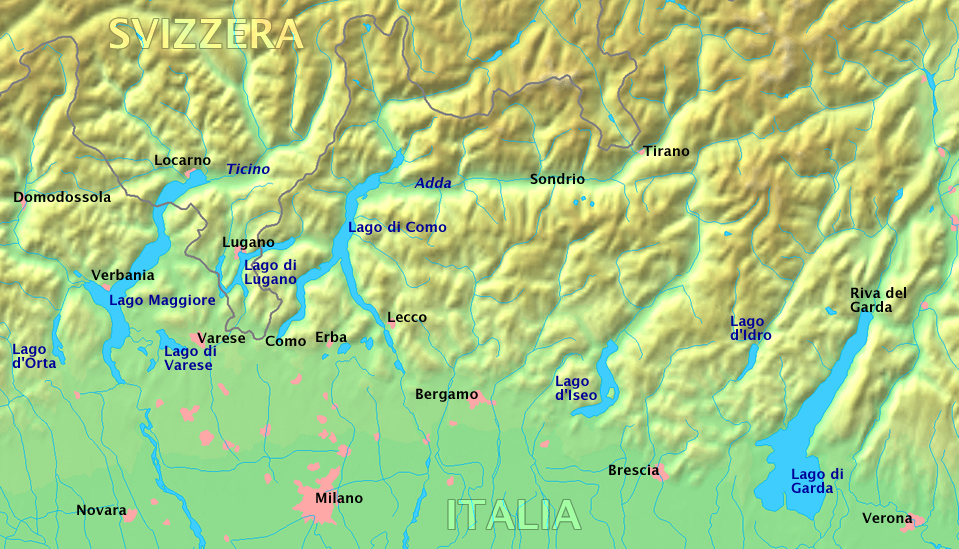
Italian pre-alpine lakes

- Baccio Lake (Lago Baccio)
- Bagno lakes (Laghi di Bagno)
- Lake Baratz (Lago di Baratz)
- Lago del Barbellino
- Lake of Barbellino Naturale (Lago del Barbellino Naturale)
- Lake Barrea (Lago di Barrea)
- Lake Beauregard (Lago di Beauregard)
- Becco Lake (Lago del Becco)
- Lake of Bianco (Valsesia) (Lago Bianco (Valsesia))
- Lake Bilancino (Lago di Bilancino)
- Biviere Lake (Lago Biviere)
- Lake Bolsena (Lago di Bolsena)
- Lago di Bomba
- Bordaglia Lake (Lago di Bordaglia)
- Lake Bracciano (Lago di Bracciano)
- Lake Braies (Lago di Braies)
- Lake of Brugneto (Lago del Brugneto)
- Lago di Burano
- Lago della Busalletta

=== C ===
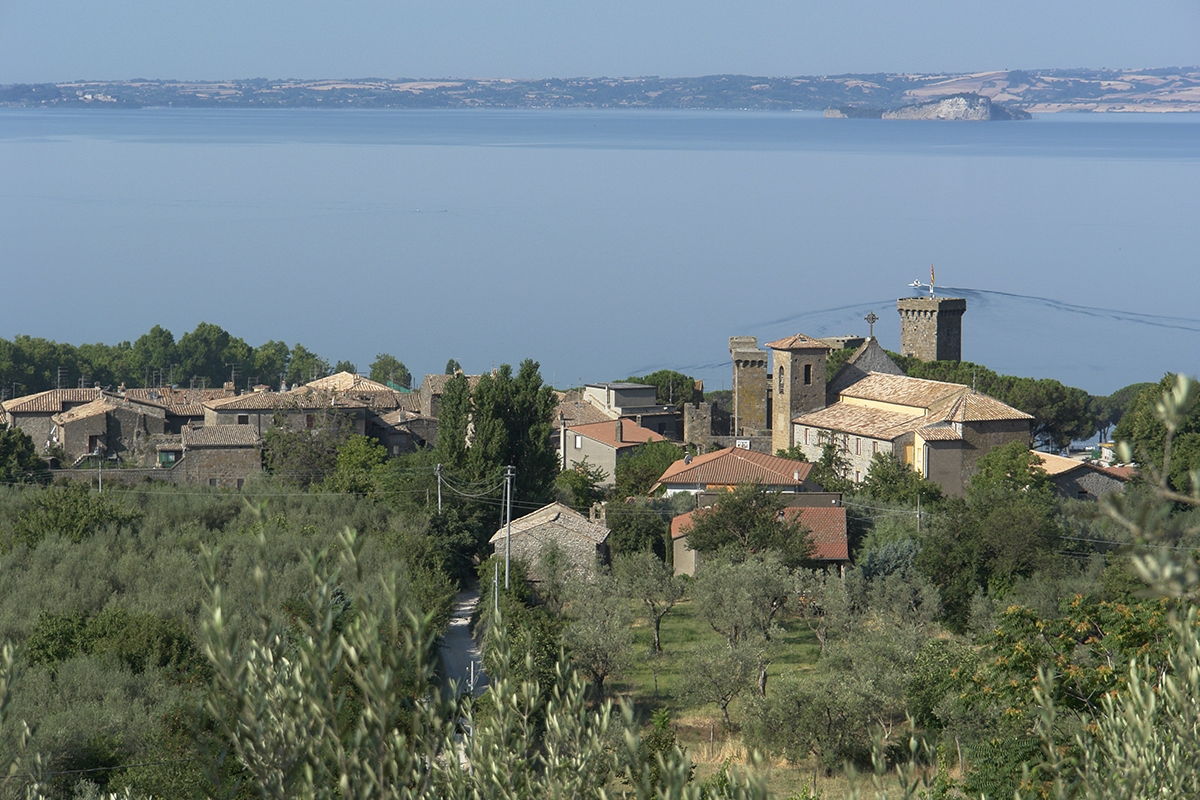
Lake Bolsena

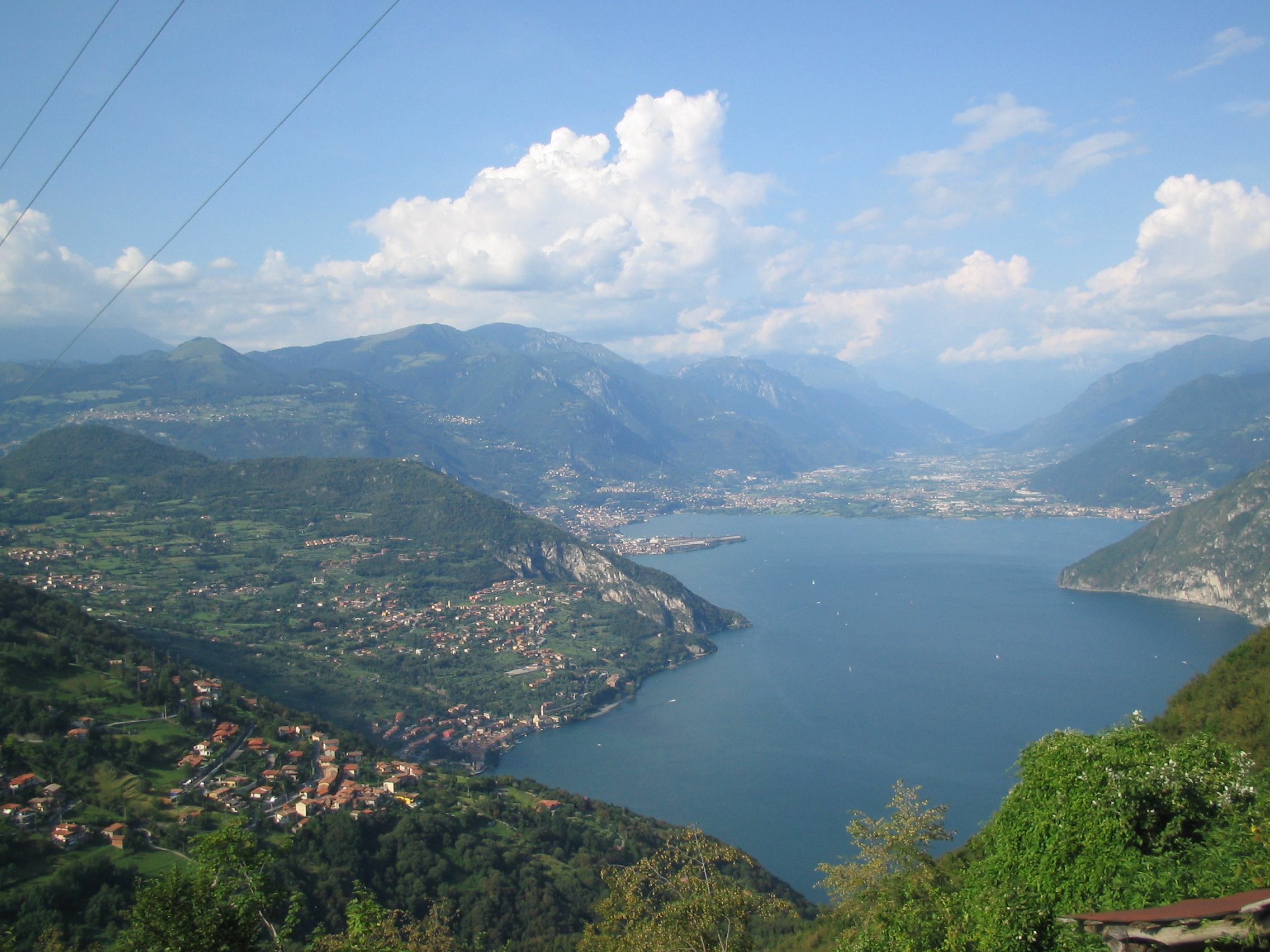
Lake Iseo

- Lake Caccamo (Lago di Caccamo)
- Stagno di Cagliari
- Lake Caldaro (Lago di Caldaro)
- Lake Caldonazzo (Lago di Caldonazzo)
- Campelli Lake (Lago Campelli)
- Lake Campotosto (Lago di Campotosto)
- Lago di Canterno
- Lago di Caprolace
- Lake Careser (Lago del Careser)
- Lake Carezza (Lago di Carezza)
- Stagno di Casaraccio
- Lake Casoli (Lago di Casoli)
- Lake Cavazzo (Lago di Cavazzo)
- Lake Cecita (Lago di Cecita)
- Lago di Cei
- Lago di Ceresole
- Lake Chiauci (Lago di Chiauci)
- Lake Chiusi (Lago di Chiusi)
- Lake Cingoli (Lago di Cingoli)
- Lago di Coca
- Lake Coghinas (Lago del Coghinas)
- Colombo Lake (Lago Colombo)
- Lago di Comabbio
- Valli di Comacchio
- Lake Como (Lago di Como or Lario)
- Lake Comunelli (Lago Comunelli)
- Lago di Conza
- Laghetto delle Conche
- Lake Corbara (Lago di Corbara)
- Lake Costalovara (Lago di Costalovara)
- Lake of Cutilia (Lago di Cotilia)

=== D ===
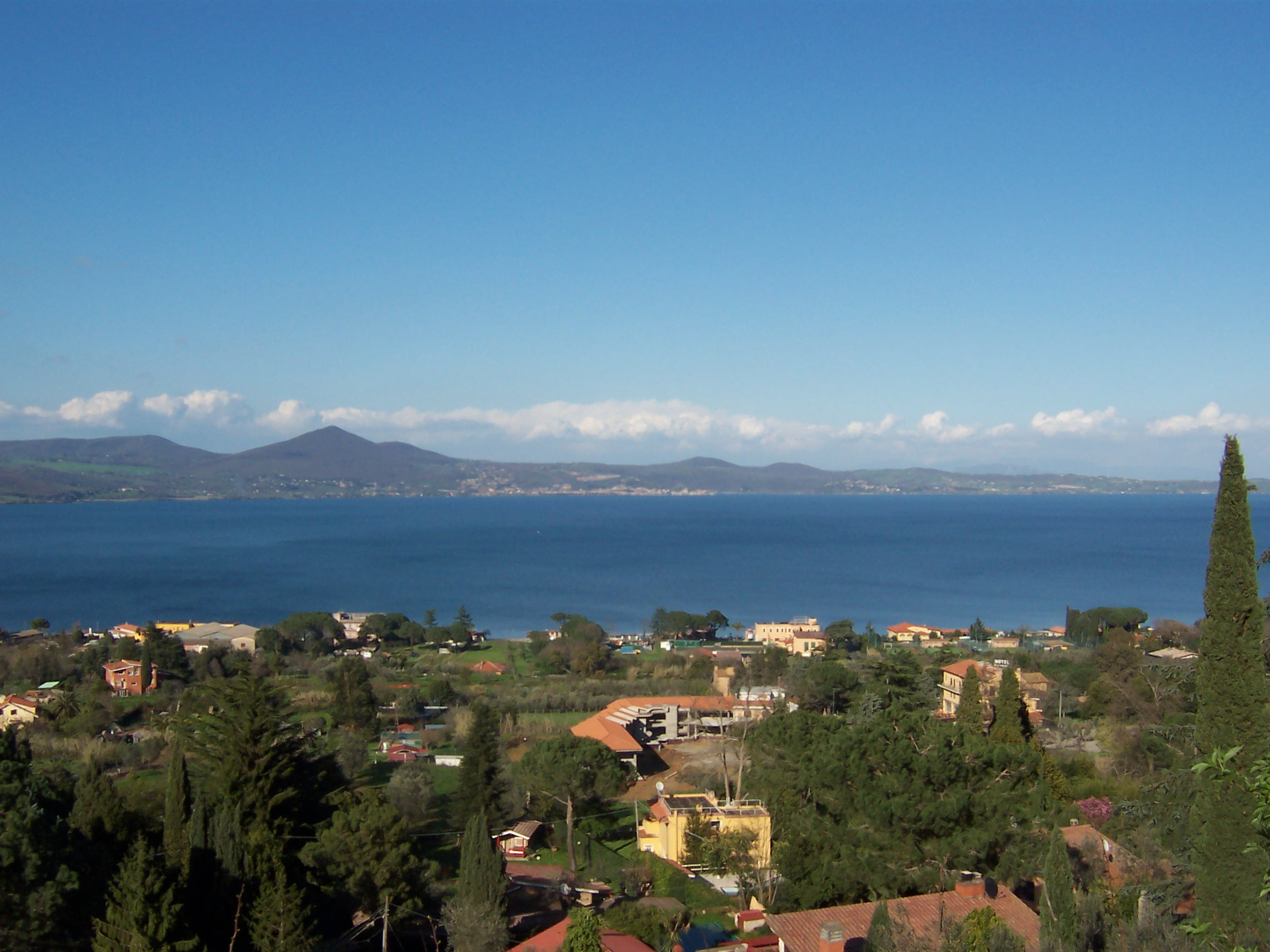
Lake Bracciano

- Lake Devero
- Lake Dietro la Torre (Lago Dietro la Torre)
- Dirillo Lake (Lago Dirillo)
- Disueri Lake (Lago Disueri)
- Lake Dobbiaco (Lago di Dobbiaco)
- Lake Duchessa (Lago della Duchessa)

=== E ===
- Lake Endine (Lago di Endine)

=== F ===
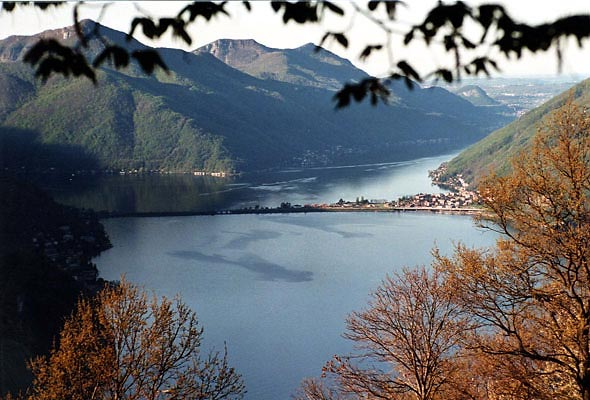
Lake Lugano

- Fanaco Lake (Lago Fanaco)
- Lake Favogna (Lago di Favogna)
- Lago di Fiastra
- Lake Fiè (Lago di Fiè)
- Lake Fogliano (Lago di Fogliano)
- Lago di Fondi
- Lake Fontana Bianca (Lago di Fontana Bianca)
- Lake Fontanej
- Lake Fortezza (Lago di Fortezza)
- Padule di Fucecchio
- Fusaro Lake (Lago Fusaro)
- Fusine lakes (Laghi di Fusine)

=== G ===
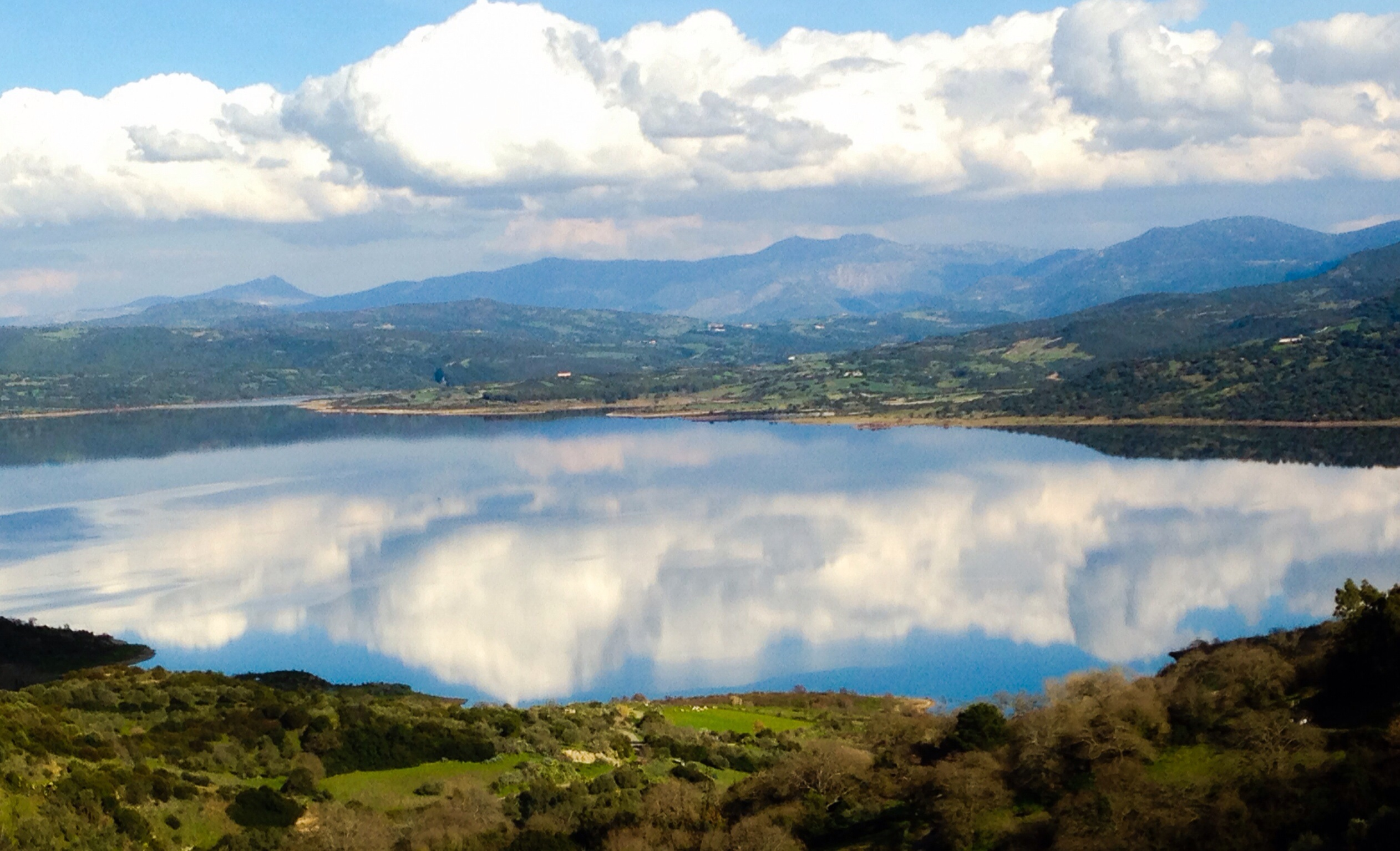
Lake Omodeo

- Lago di Ganna
- Garcia Lake (Lago Garcia)
- Lake Garda (Lago di Garda or Benaco)
- Lake Garlate (Lago di Garlate)
- Gattero Lake (Lago del Gattero)
- Gelt Lake (Lago Gelt)
- Gerundo Lake (Lago Gerundo)
- Lago di Ghirla
- Lake Giacopiane (Lago di Giacopiane)
- Lake Gioveretto (Lago di Gioveretto)
- Laghi del Gorzente
- Lago di Guardialfiera
- Gurrida Lake (Lago Gurrida)
- Gusana (Lago di Gusana)

=== I ===
- Lake Idro (Lago d'Idro or Eridio)
- Lake Iseo (Lago d'Iseo or Sebino)

=== L ===
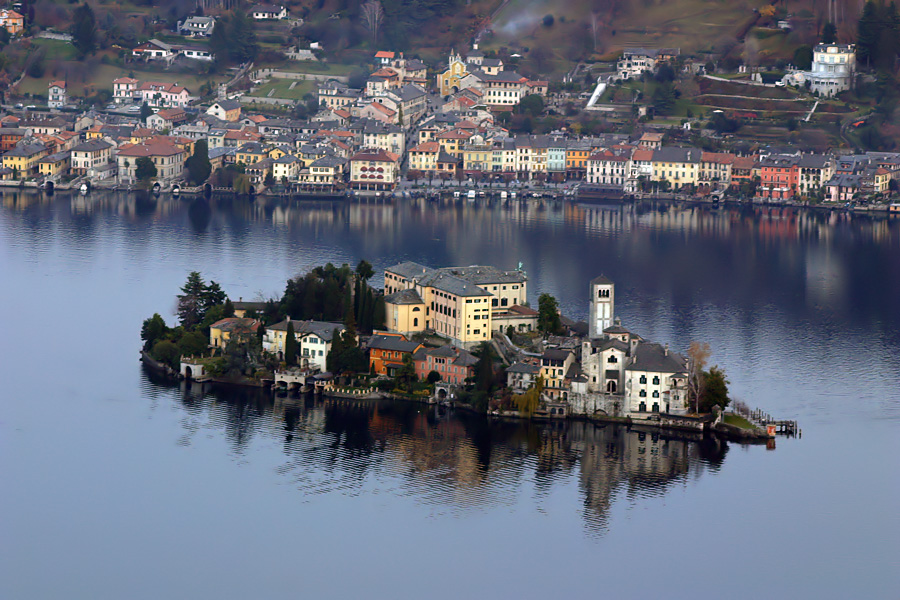
Lake Orta

- Lake Lamar (Lago di Lamar)
- Lame Lake (Lago delle Lame)
- Lake of Lases (Lago di Lases)
- Laghi di Lavagnina
- La Vota Lake (Lago La Vota)
- Lake Ledro (Lago di Ledro)
- Lago di Lentini
- Lake Lesina (Lago di Lesina)
- Lago di Levico
- Lake Liscia (Lago Liscia)
- Lago di Lucrino
- Lake Lugano (Lago di Lugano)
- Lake Lungo (Lago Lungo)

=== M ===
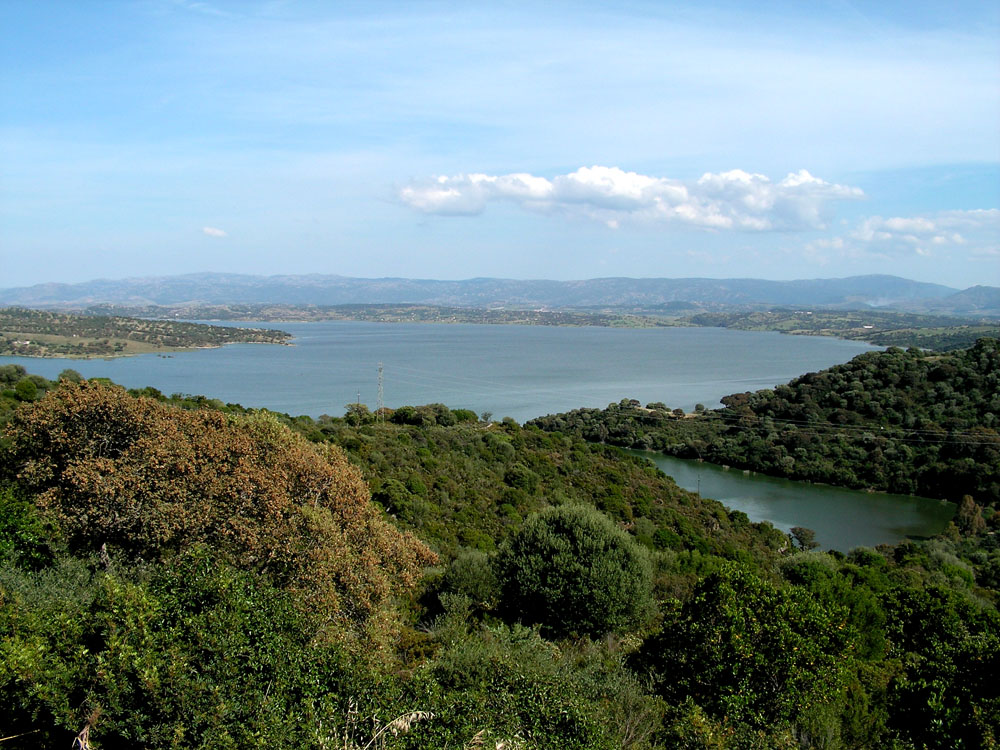
Lake Coghinas

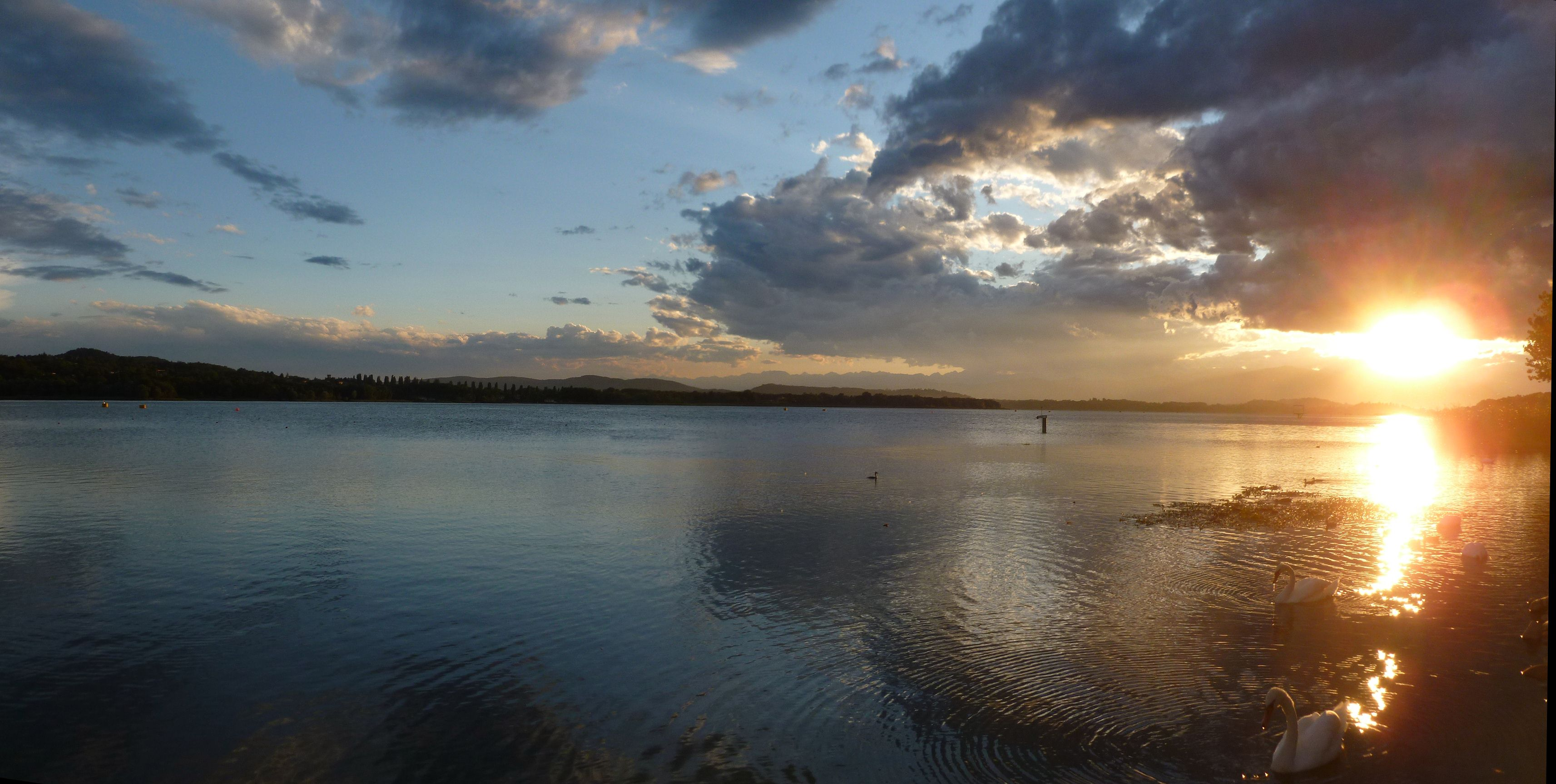
Lake Varese

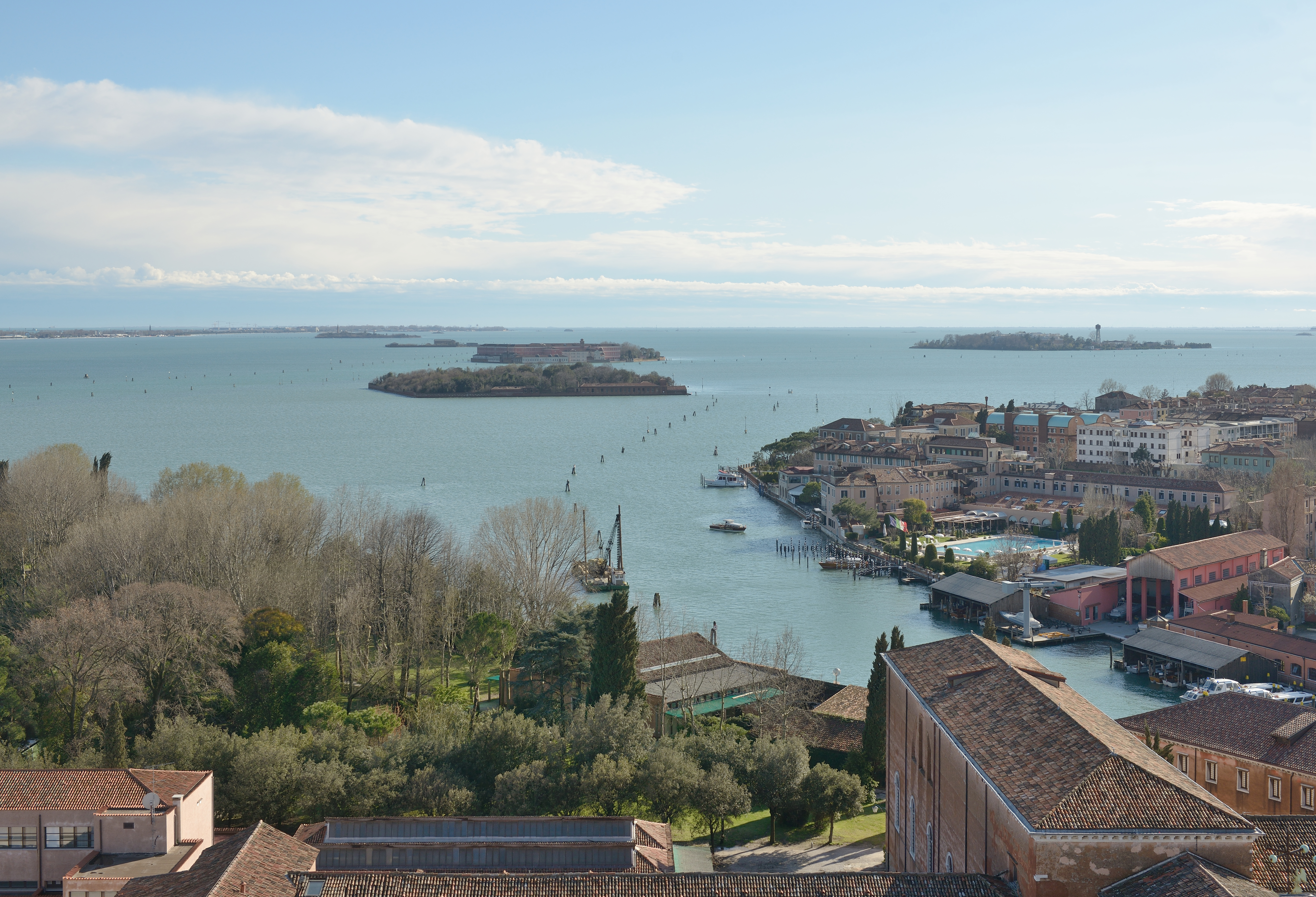
Venetian Lagoon

- Lake Maggiore (Lago Maggiore or Verbano)
- Lago di Malciaussia
- Lake Malgina (Lago della Malgina)
- Mantova Lakes (Laghi di Mantova)
- Marano Lagoon (Laguna di Marano)
- Marcio Lake (Lago Marcio)
- Lake Martignano (Lago di Martignano)
- Lake Massaciuccoli (Lago di Massaciuccoli)
- Lake Matese (Lago del Matese)
- Maulazzo Lake (Lago Maulazzo)
- Lake Meja (Lago della Meja)
- Lake Mergozzo (Lago di Mergozzo)
- Lake Mezzano (Lago di Mezzano)
- Lago di Mezzola
- Lake Miseno (Lago Miseno)
- Lake Misérin
- Lake Misurina (Lago di Misurina)
- Lake Molveno (Lago di Molveno)
- Lake Monaci (Lago dei Monaci)
- Lake Monastero (Lago di Monastero)
- Monate lake (Lago di Monate)
- Lake of Montedoglio (Lago di Montedoglio)
- Lake Montespluga (Lago di Montespluga)
- Lago di Montepulciano
- Lake Monterosi (Lago di Monterosi)
- Lake Monticolo (Lago di Monticolo)
- Lago di Montorfano
- Lake Morello (Lago Morello)
- Lake Moro (Valle Brembana) (Lago Moro)
- Lake Moro (Valle Camonica) (Lago Moro)
- Lake of Morto (Lago Morto)
- Mucrone Lake (Lago del Mucrone)
- Lake Mulargia (Lago Mulargia)

=== N ===
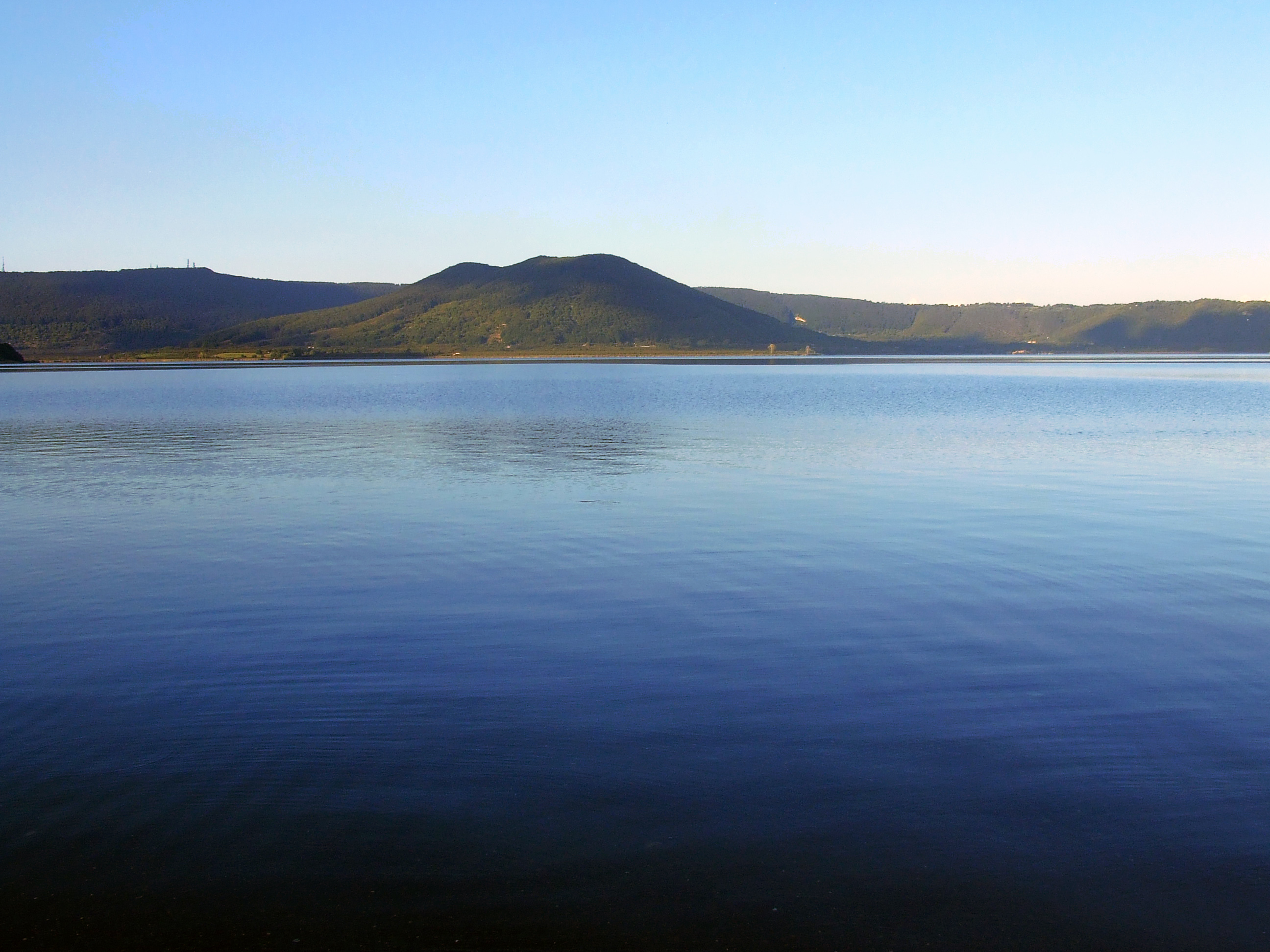
Lake Vico

- Nazioni lake (Lago delle Nazioni)
- Lake Nemi (Lago di Nemi)
- Lake Negrisiola (Lago di Negrisiola)
- Lago Nero (Bergamo)
- Lago Nero (Piacenza)
- Lago di Neves
- Lake Nicito (Lago di Nicito)
- Lake Val di Noci (Lago di Val di Noci)
- Nicoletti Lake (Lago Nicoletti)

=== O ===
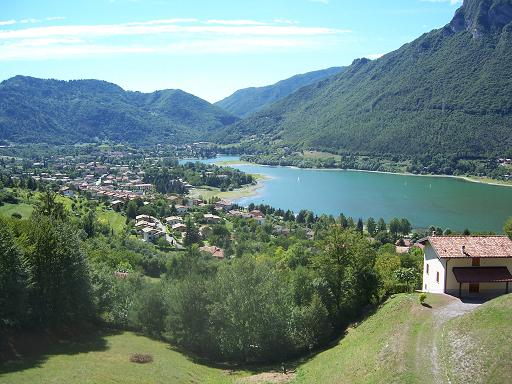
Lake Idro

- Lake of Occhito (Lago di Occhito)
- Lago di Ogliastro
- Lake Olginate (Lago di Olginate)
- Lake Olivo (Lago Olivo)
- Lake Omodeo (Lago Omodeo)
- Laguna di Orbetello
- Lake Orta (Lago d'Orta or Cusio)
- Lago di Ortiglieto
- Lake Osiglia (Lago di Osiglia)

=== P ===
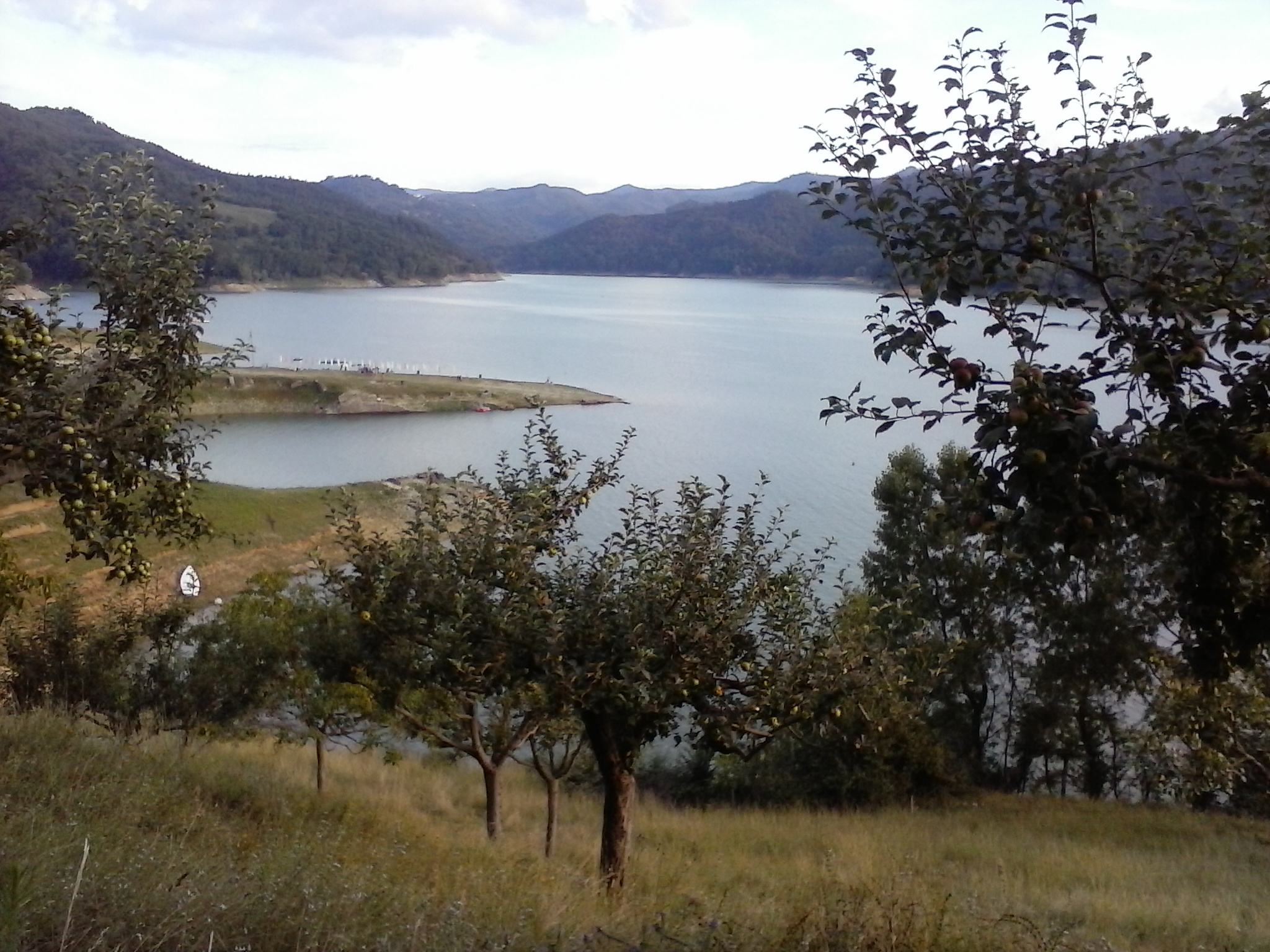
Lago del Salto

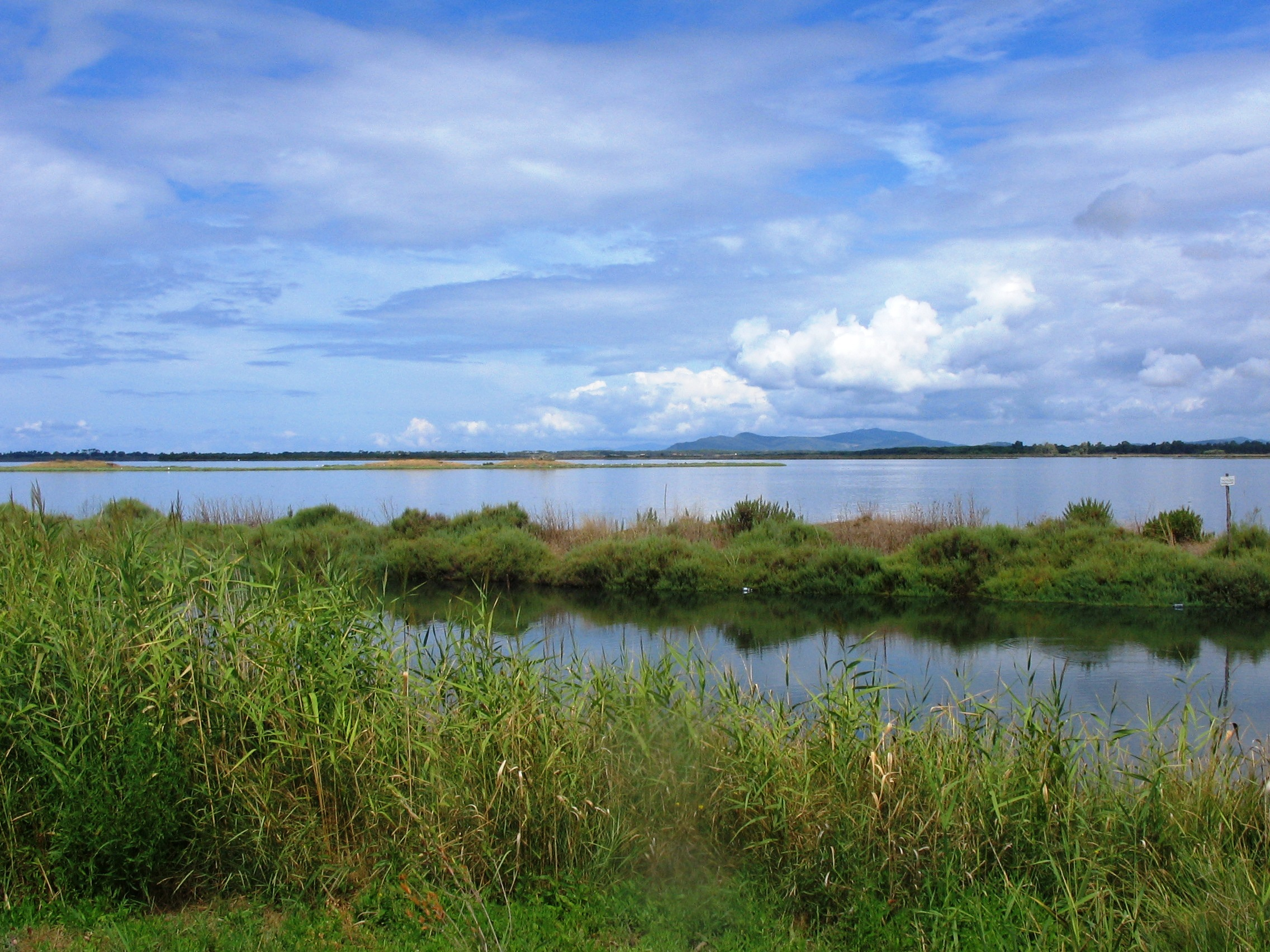
Laguna di Orbetello

- Lago di Patria
- Lake Pellaud
- Lake Penne (Lago di Penne)
- Lago di Piana degli Albanesi
- Lago delle Piane
- Piano lake (Lago di Piano)
- Lake Pian Palù (Lago di Pian Palù)
- Lake Piatto (Lago Piatto)
- Stagno di Pilo
- Lake Place-Moulin (Lago di Place-Moulin)
- Lago di Piediluco
- Lake of Pietra del Pertusillo (Lago di Pietra del Pertusillo)
- Lake Pietrafitta (Lago di Pietrafitta)
- Lago di Pilato
- Pio Lake (Lago Pio)
- Pergusa Lake (Lago Pergusa)
- Poggio Perotto lake (Lago di Poggio Perotto)
- Stagno di Platamona
- Lake Pontechianale (Lago di Pontechianale)
- Lake Pontesei (Lago di Pontesei)
- Lake Ponte Vittorio
- Lake Porta (Lago di Porta)
- Lago di Posta Fibreno
- Pozzillo Lake (Lago Pozzillo)
- Lake Prile (Lago Prile)
- Prizzi Lake (Lago di Prizzi)
- Lake Provvidenza (Lago di Provvidenza)
- Lake Puccini (Lago Puccini)
- Lake of Pusiano (Lago di Pusiano)

=== Q ===
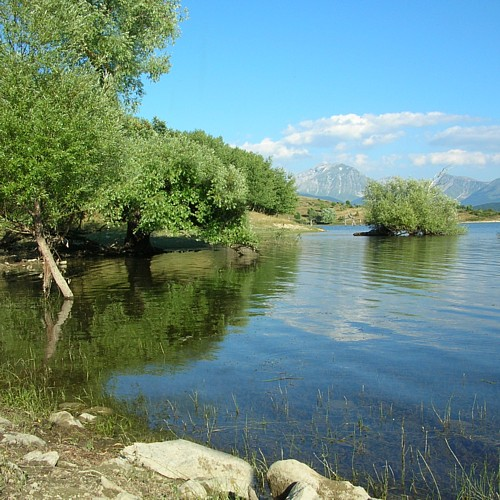
Lake Capotosto

- Lake Quaira (Lago di Quaira)

=== R ===
- Lake of Rascino (Lago di Rascino)
- Ravasanella lake (Lago Ravasanella)
- Lake Resia (Lago di Resia)
- Revine Lago lakes (Laghi di Revine Lago)
- Lake Ragogna
- Lake Ravedis
- Lake Ripasottile (Lago di Ripasottile)
- Lake Rochemolles (Lago di Rochemolles)
- Lake Rossa (Lago della Rossa)

=== S ===
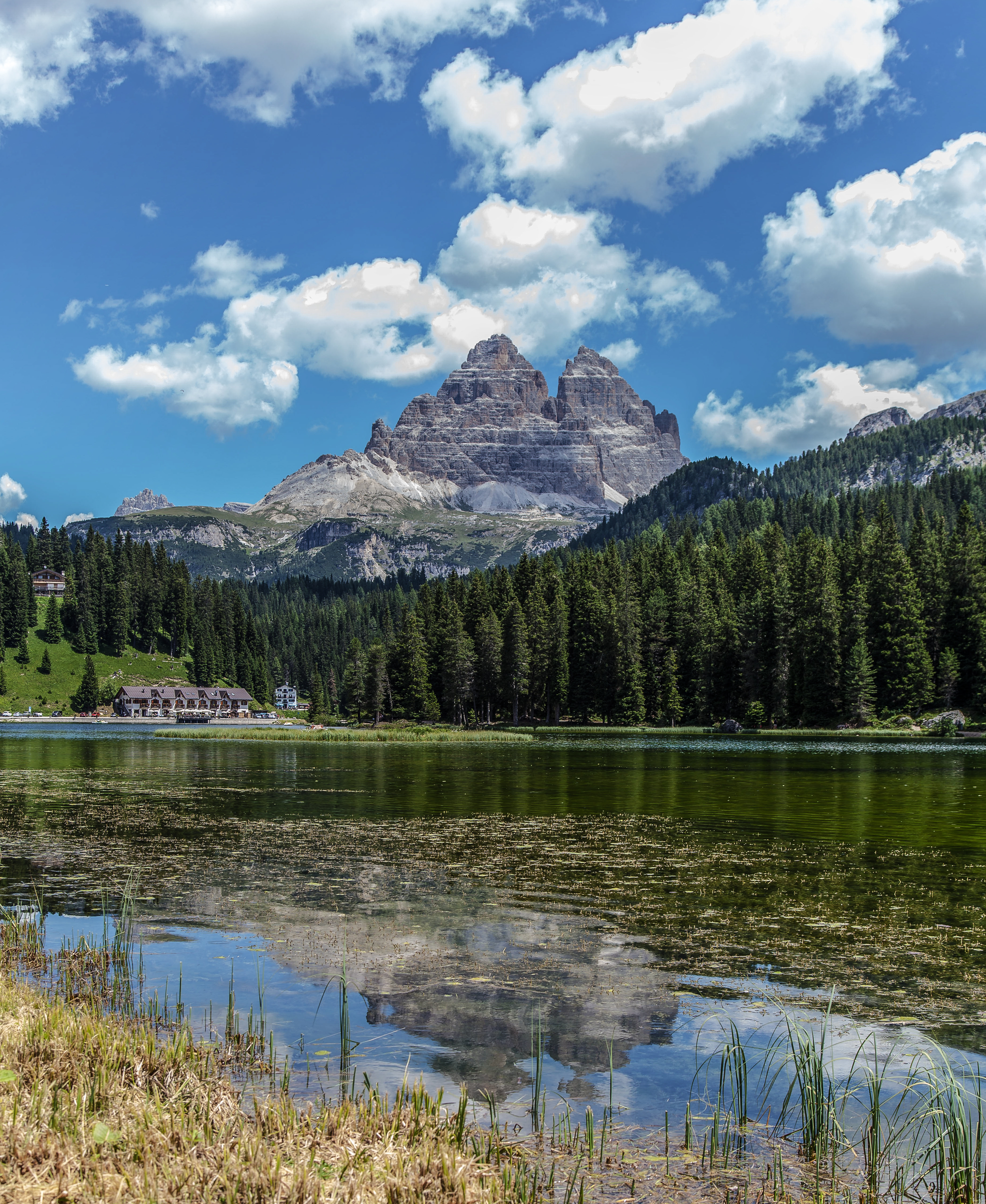
Lake Misurina

- Lake Sabetta (Lago Sabetta)
- Lake of Salarno (Lago di Salarno)
- Salso Lake (Lago Salso)
- Lago del Salto
- Lago di San Casciano
- San Floriano lake (Lago di San Floriano)
- Lago di San Giuliano
- Lago di San Valentino alla Muta
- Lake Santa Croce (Lago di Santa Croce)
- Santa Croce Lake (Lago di Santa Croce)
- Stagno di Santa Giusta
- Lago di Santa Giustina
- Lago di Santa Rosalia
- Santo Lake (Lago Santo)
- Lake Sassano
- Sassi Neri lake (Laghetto di Sassi Neri)
- Scaffaiolo Lake (Lago Scaffaiolo)
- Lago di Scandarello
- Lago di Scanno
- Lake Scanzano (Lago Scanzano)
- Lago del Segrino
- Lago di Serra del Corvo
- Lago della Serraia
- Serrù Lake (Lago Serrù)
- Lake of Sibolla (Lago di Sibolla)
- Lake Sinizzo (Lago Sinizzo)
- Lake Sirino (Lago Sirino)
- Lake Sirio (Lago Sirio)
- Laghi di Sopranes

=== T ===
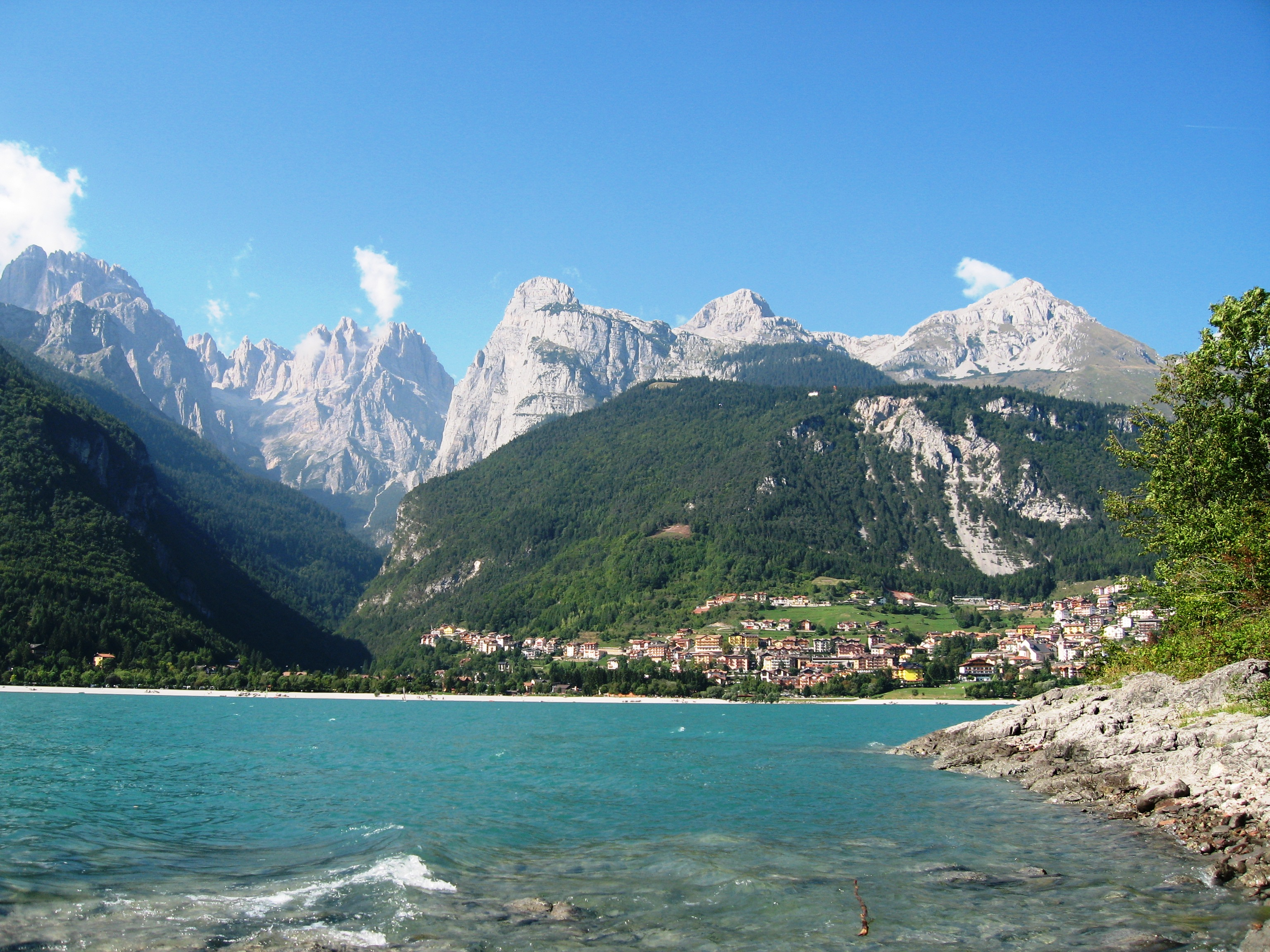
Lake Molveno

- Lake of Tafone (Lago del Tafone)
- Lake Talvacchia (Lago di Talvacchia)
- Telese Lake (Lago di Telese)
- Lago di Tenno
- Lake Terlago (Lago di Terlago)
- Terra Nera lake (Laghetto di Terra Nera)
- Lago di Toblino
- Torbido Lake (Lago Torbido)
- Lago di Tovel
- Lake Trasimeno (Lago Trasimeno)
- Trearie Lake (Lago Trearie)
- Lago di Trebecco
- Lake Trinità (Lago della Trinità)
- Lake of Trote (Lago delle Trote)
- Lago del Turano
- Turchino Lake (Lago Turchino)

=== V ===
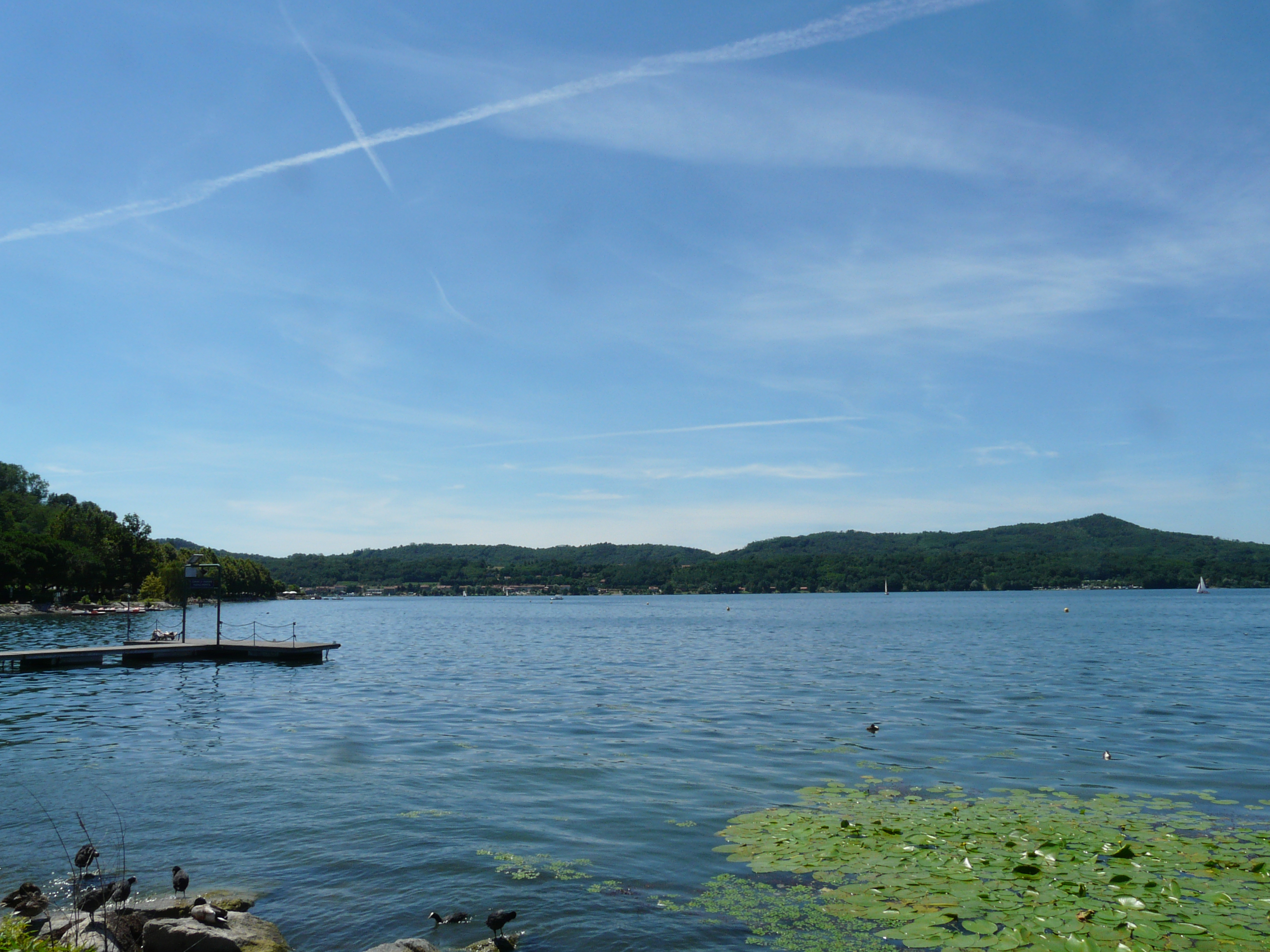
Lago di Viverone

- Lago della Vacca
- Lake Valdaora (Lago di Valdaora)
- Lago di Val di Noci
- Lago di Valdurna
- Lake Valvestino (Lago di Valvestino)
- Lake Varano (Lago di Varano)
- Lake Varese (Lago di Varese)
- Lake Varna (Lago di Varna)
- Lago della Vecchia
- Venetian Lagoon (Laguna di Venezia)
- Lake Ventina (Lago di Ventina)
- Lago di Vernago
- Verney Lake (Lago Verney)
- Lake Vico (Lago di Vico)
- Lago di Viverone

=== Z ===
- Lake Zoccolo (Lago di Zoccolo)

== See also ==
- Italian Lakes
- Fucine Lake (Lago Fucino)
