= Pio Lake =

Lake in Italy

Lago Pio
- Location within Abruzzo
- Location: Province of L'Aquila, Abruzzo
- Coordinates: 41.933049°N 13.842096°E
- Primary outflows: none
- Basin countries: Italy
- Surface elevation: 930 m (3,050 ft)

Lago Pio is a lake, south of the village Villalago in the Province of L'Aquila, Abruzzo, Italy.
