= Gurrida Lake =

Lake in Sicily, Italy

- Location within Sicily
- Location: Province of Catania, Sicily
- Coordinates: 37°51′N 14°54′E
- Basin countries: Italy
- Surface elevation: 835 m (2,740 ft)

Gurrida Lake is a lake in the Province of Catania, Sicily, Italy.

The lake stands near Randazzo in the north-west side of the Etna in the Province of Catania.

It was created when an eruption of Etna in 1536 blocked part of the course of the Flascio river.

During summer time it is often dry. This is not only due to the lower flow from the river but also due to the lake bed permeability.
