= Lago di Salarno =

Lake in Lombardy, Italy

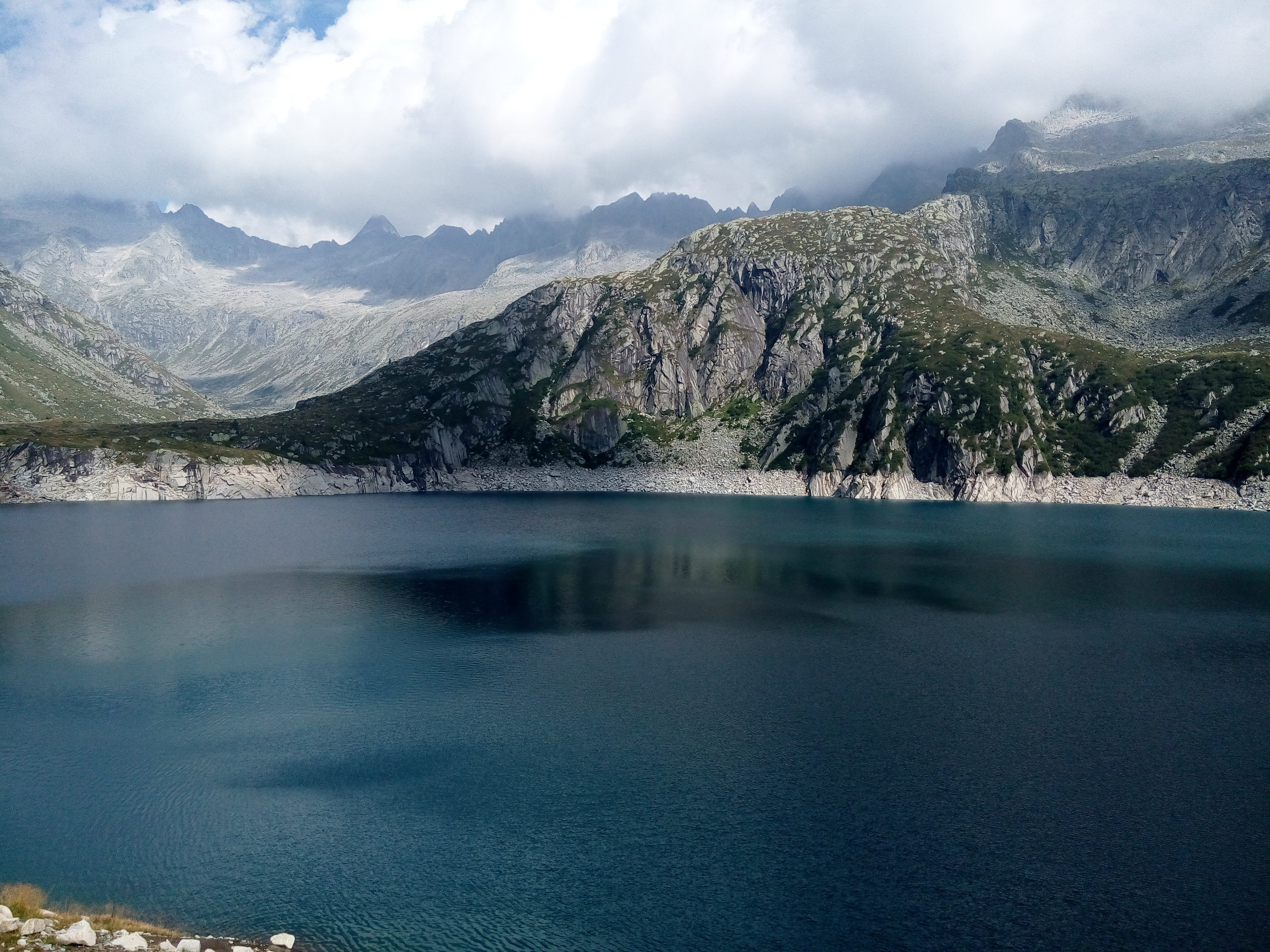

- Location within Lombardy
- Location: Province of Brescia, Lombardy
- Coordinates: 46°6′35″N 10°28′34″E
- Primary inflows: Torrente Salarno
- Primary outflows: Torrente Salarno
- Basin countries: Italy
- Surface elevation: 2,070 m (6,790 ft)

Lago di Salarno is a lake in the Province of Brescia, Lombardy, Italy.
