= Torbido Lake =

Lake in Italy

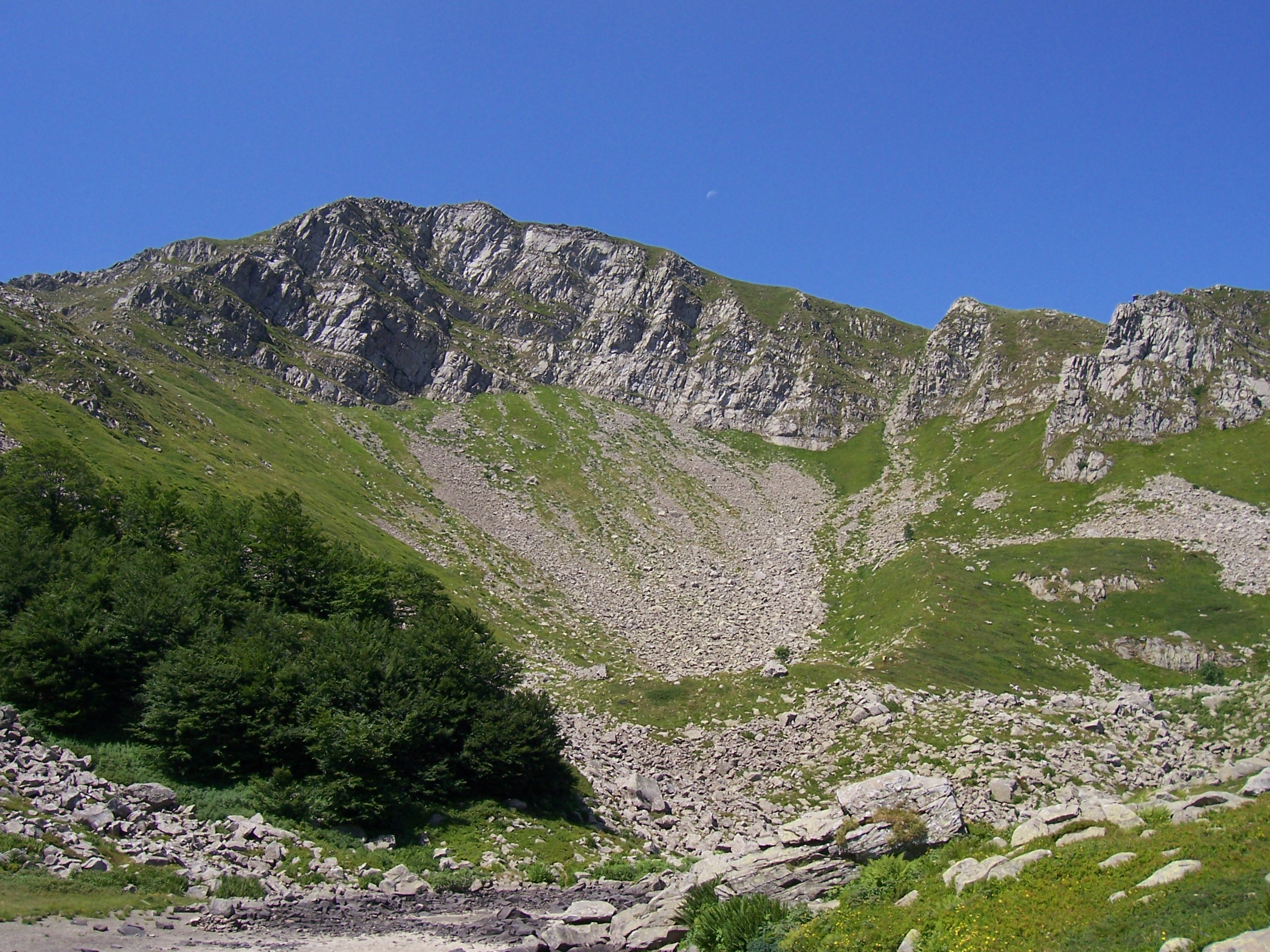
- Rondinaio Mountain stands over Torbido Lake

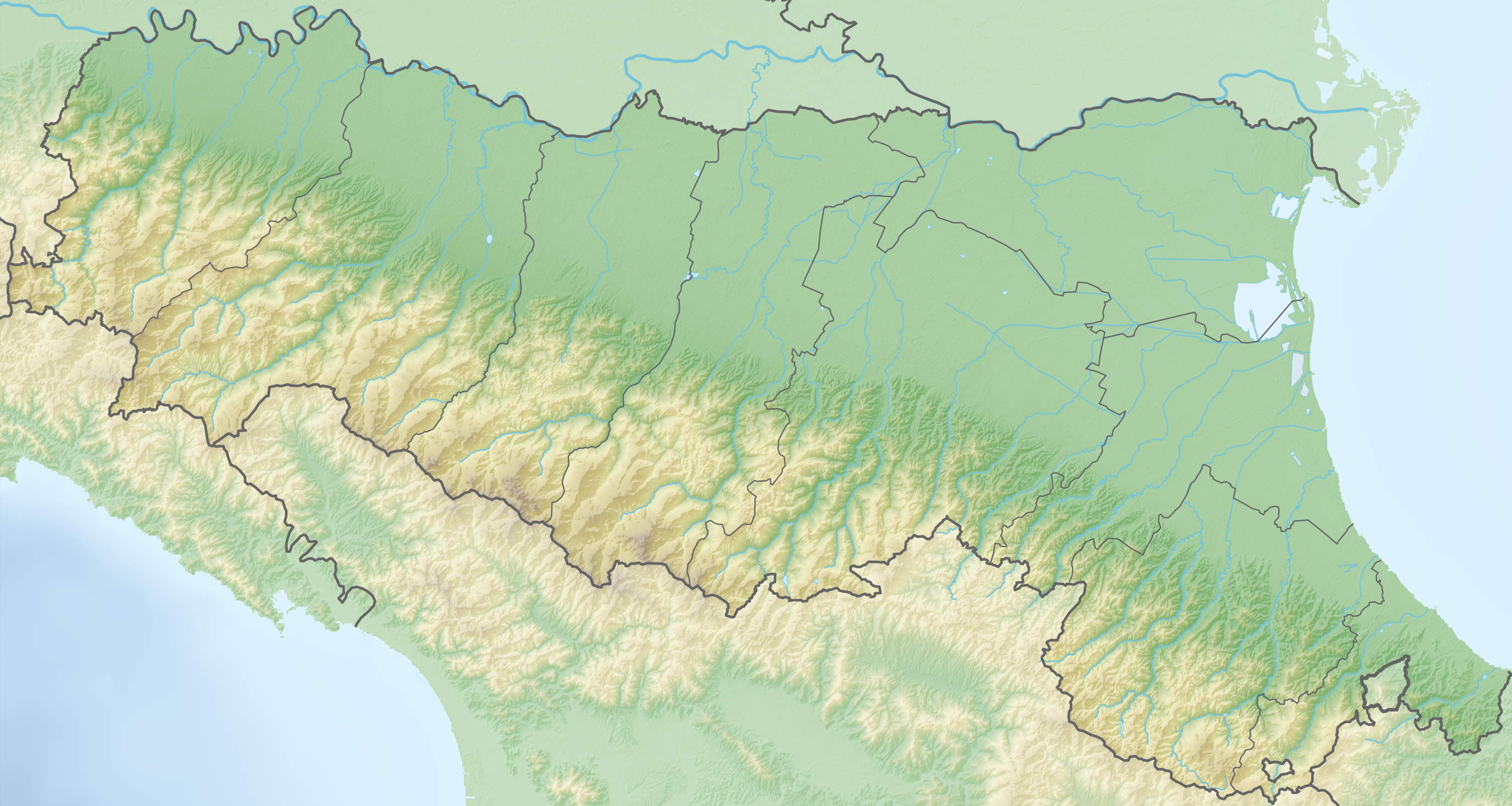
- Location within Emilia-Romagna
- Location: Province of Modena, Emilia-Romagna
- Coordinates: 44.1162°N 10.5989°E
- Surface area: 0.001 km^{2} (0.00039 sq mi)
- Surface elevation: 1,650 m (5,410 ft)

Torbido Lake is a lake in the Province of Modena, Emilia-Romagna, Italy. At an elevation of 1,650 m (5,410 ft), its surface area is 0.001 km^{2} (0.00039 sq mi).
