= Lake Pellaud =

Two lakes in upper Rhêmes Valley, Aosta Valley, Italy

Lakes of Pellaud
- Lacs du Pellaud
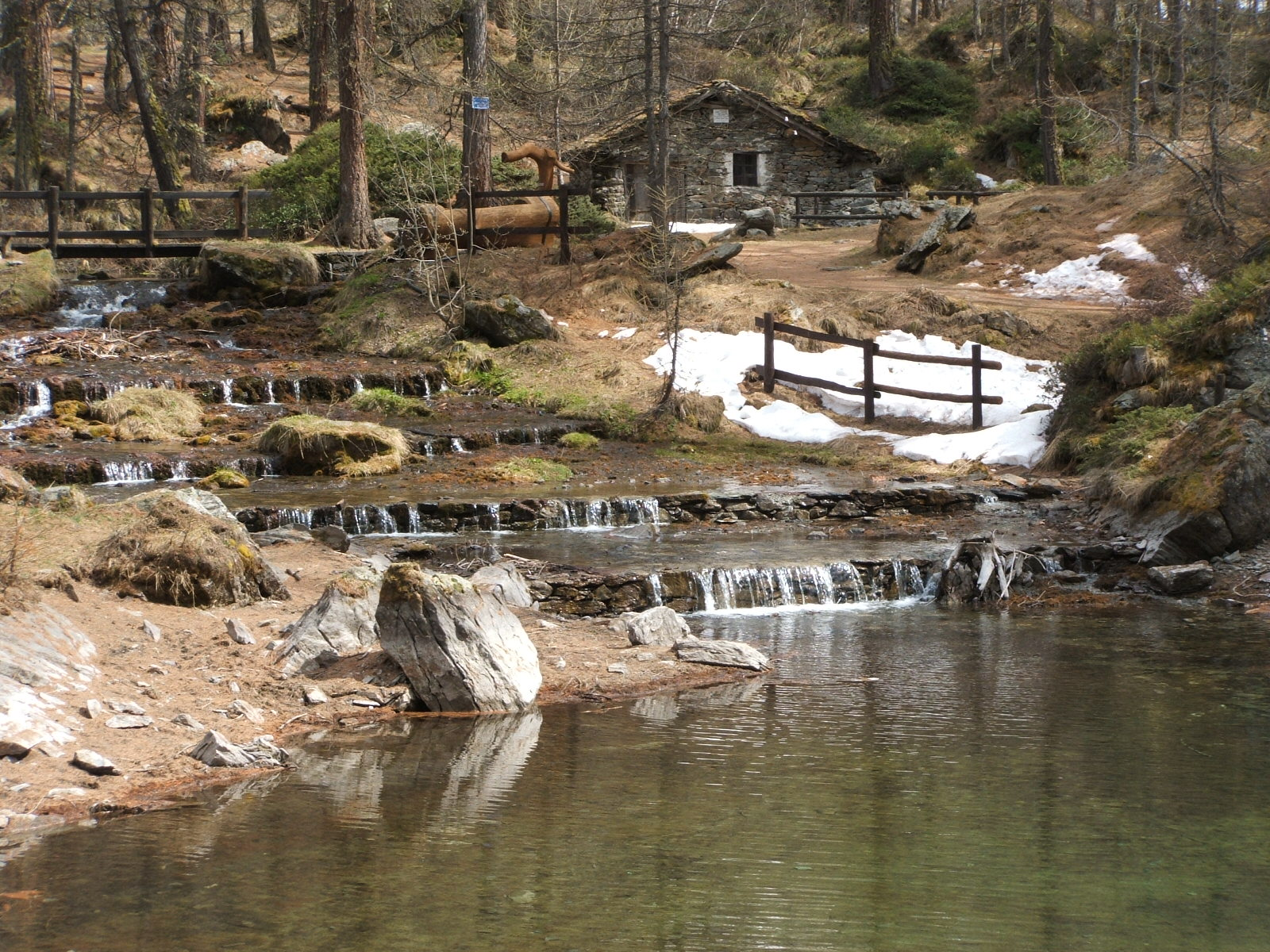
- The lake and the hydroelectric plant

- Location of Lakes Pellaud
- Location: Rhêmes-Notre-Dame, Aosta Valley, Italy
- Coordinates: 45.5667°N 7.11667°E
- Primary inflows: Upper Lake Pellaud
- Basin countries: Italy
- Surface area: 0.0019 km^{2} (0.00073 sq mi)
- Surface elevation: 1,870 m (6,140 ft)
- Frozen: During the winter season

The Lakes Pellaud (French: Lacs du Pellaud) are two lakes located in the municipality of Rhêmes-Notre-Dame, in Aosta Valley, and more precisely in the area known as Jardin des Anglais (French for "English Garden").

== Description ==
The lake is situated within a forest, and the area is equipped with benches and tables for picnics.

=== Hydroelectric plant ===
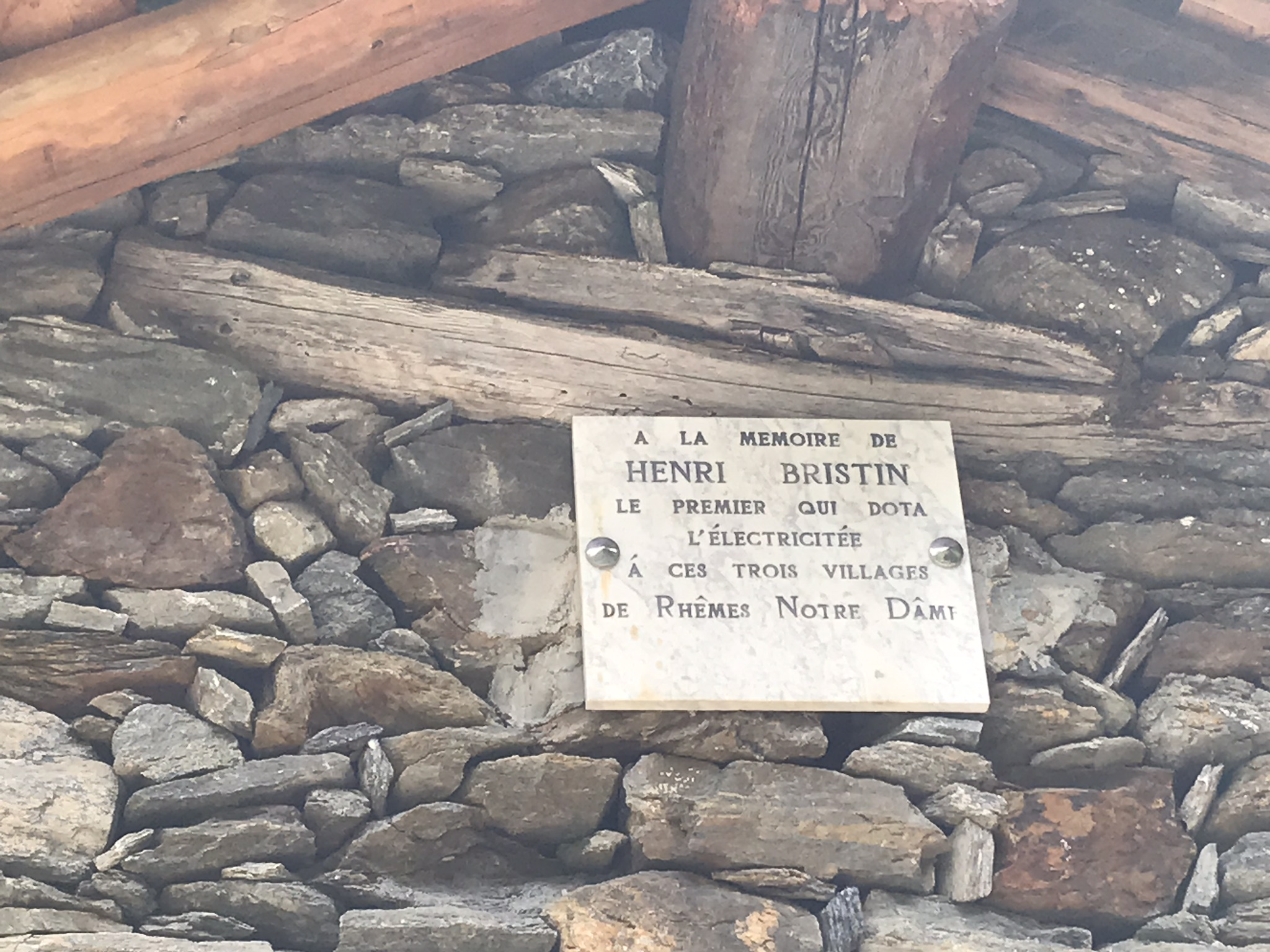
Plaque dedicated to Henri Bristin, builder of the plant.

The Pellaud mill, originally built for grinding cereals, was transformed into a small hydroelectric plant in 1921 by Henri Bristin with the creation of the Société coopérative électrique du Lé. This operation enabled the provision of lighting to the hamlets of Pont, Pellaud, and La Chaudanaz (or La Chaudanne).

== Access ==
The lakes can be reached starting from the hamlet of Chanavey, the hamlet of Pellaud, or the main village of Bruil.
