= Lago di Lases =

Lake in Trentino, Italy

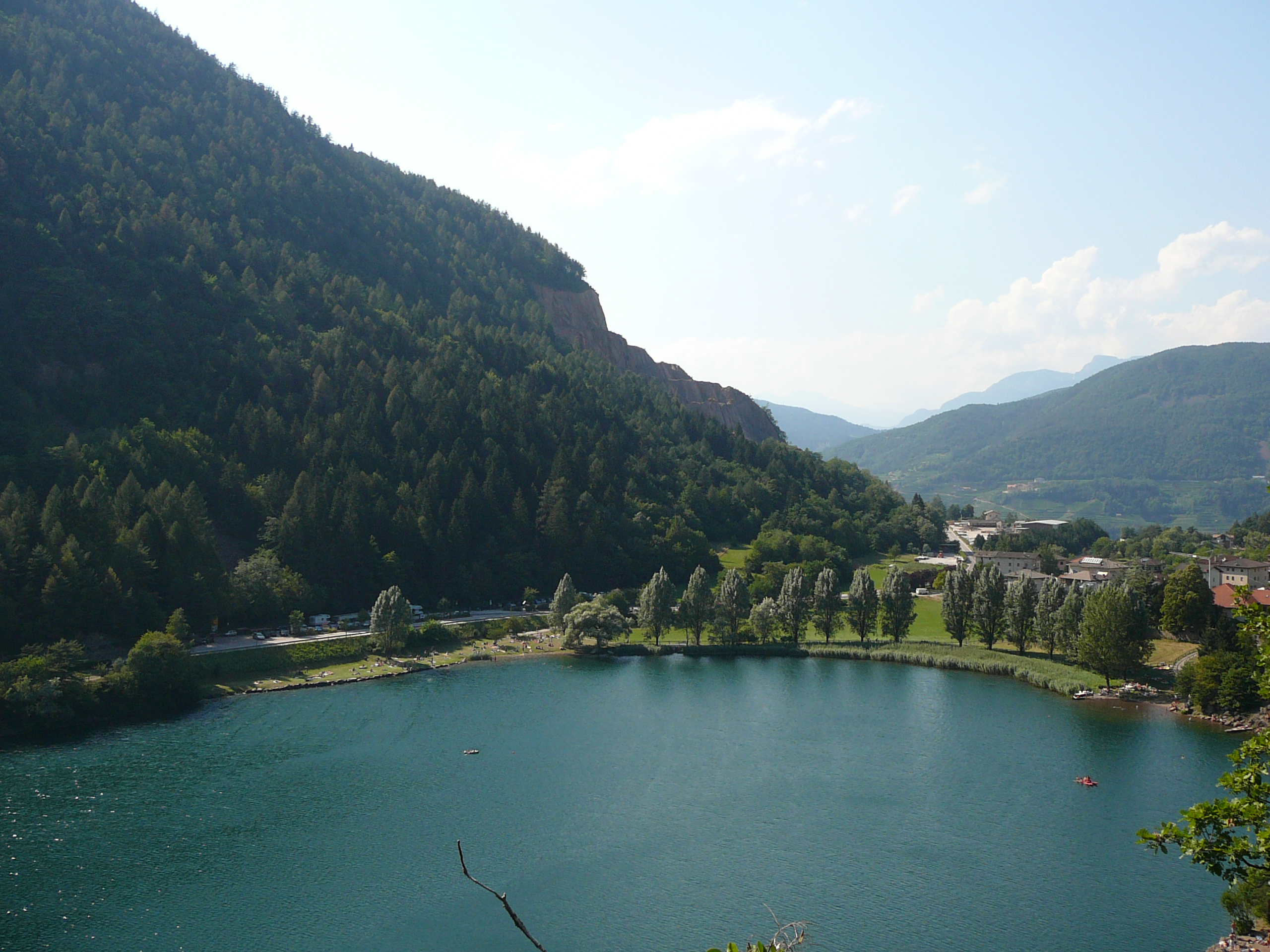

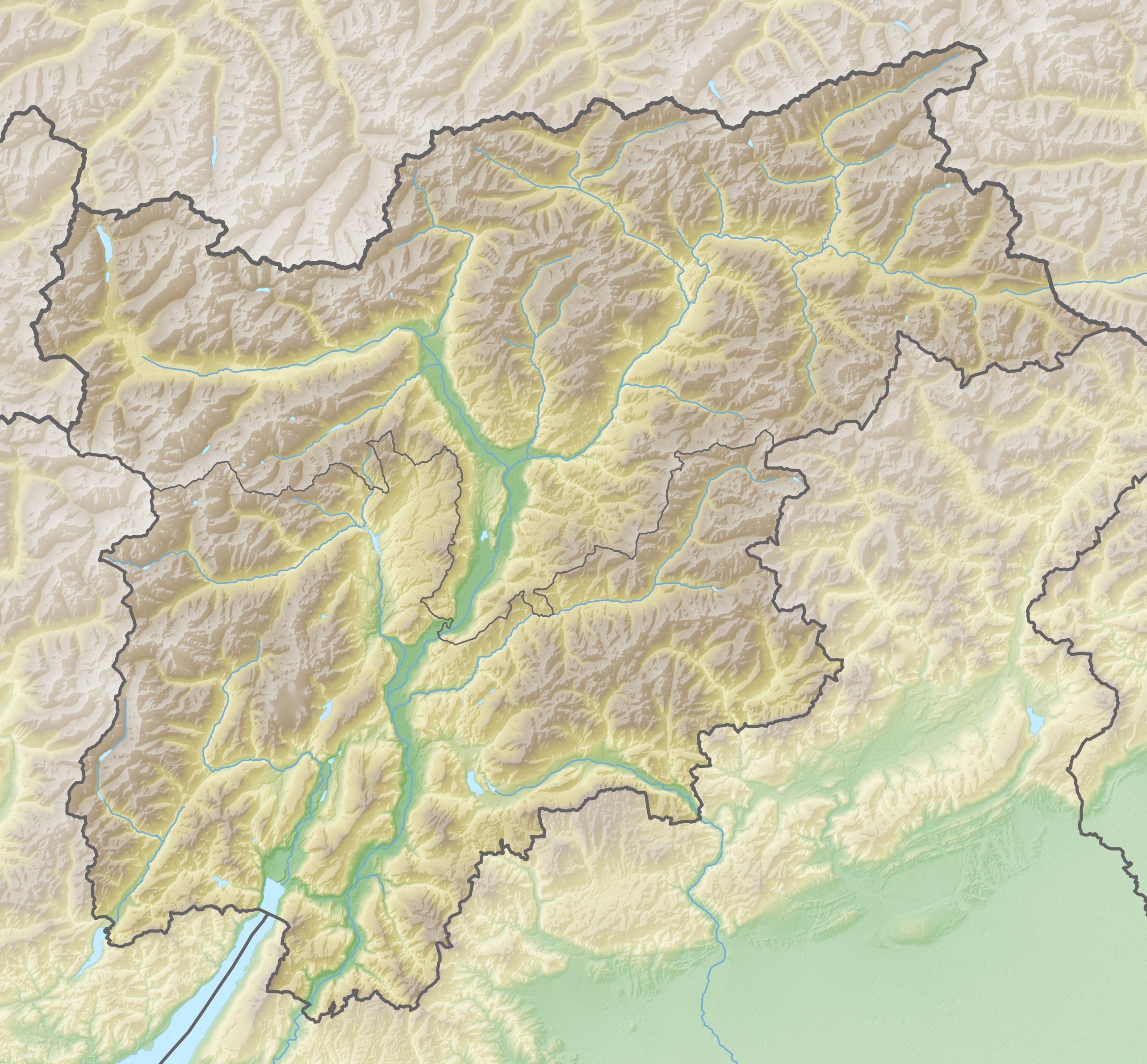
- Location within Trentino-Alto Adige/Südtirol
- Location: Trentino
- Coordinates: 46°08′26″N 11°13′17″E
- Basin countries: Italy
- Surface area: 0.16 km^{2} (0.062 sq mi)
- Surface elevation: 629 m (2,064 ft)

Lago di Lases is a lake in Trentino, Italy. At an elevation of 629 m, its surface area is 0.16 km².

== Geography ==
Lago di Lases, also known as Lake Lases, is an alpine lake situated in the Val di Cembra valley within the Trentino region of northern Italy. Located at an elevation of 629 metres (2,064 feet) above sea level, the lake spans a surface area of approximately 0.16 square kilometres.

The lake is a remnant of glacial activity from the last Ice Age.
