= Lago Bianco (Valsesia) =

Lake in the Province of Vercelli, Piedmont, Italy

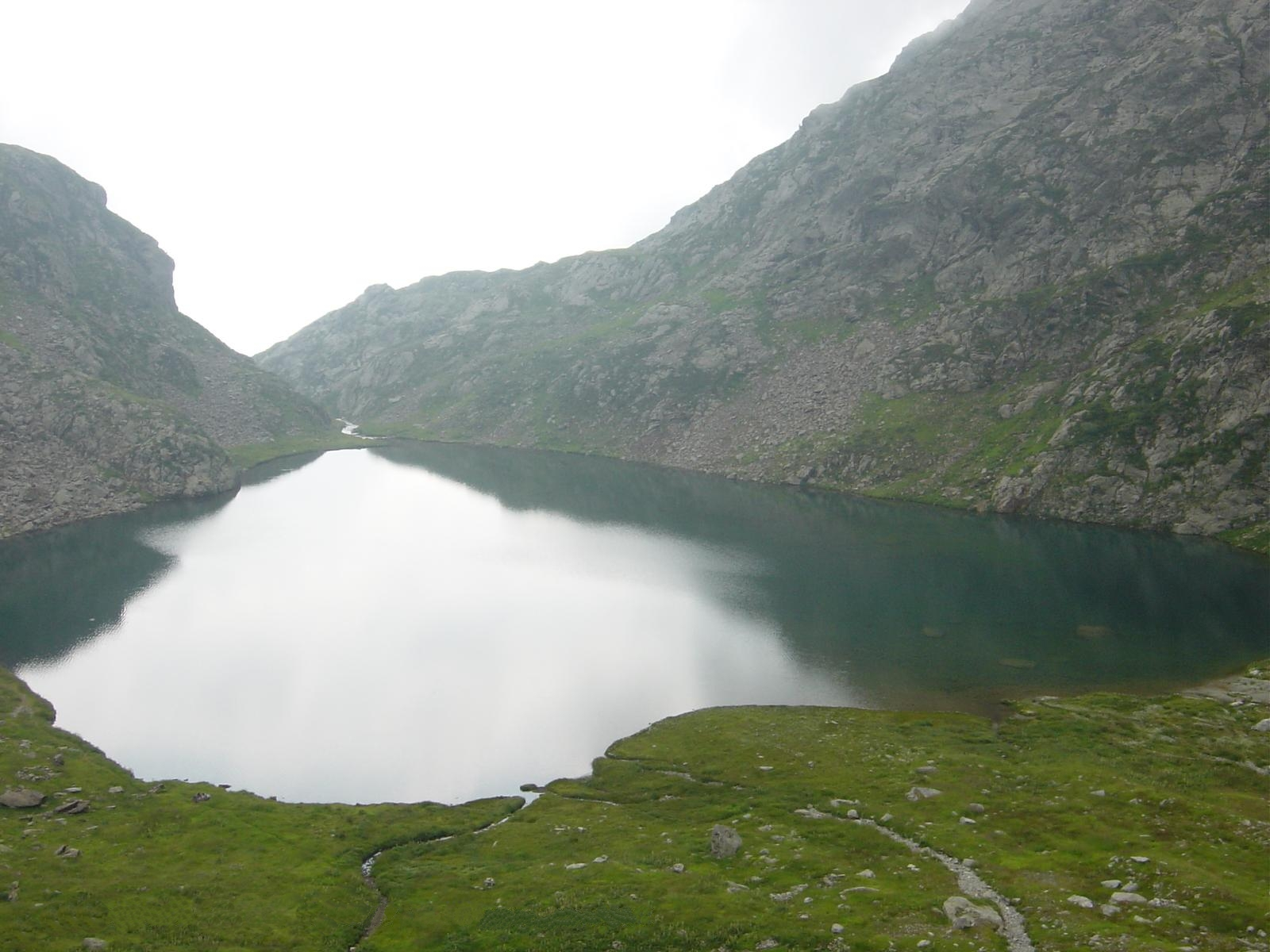

- Location within Piedmont
- Location: Province of Vercelli, Piedmont
- Coordinates: 45°48′30″N 7°52′44″E
- Primary outflows: torrente Rissuolo
- Basin countries: Italy
- Surface area: 0.03 km^{2} (0.012 sq mi)
- Surface elevation: 2,332 m (7,651 ft)

Lago Bianco (Italian for "white lake") is a lake in the Province of Vercelli, Piedmont, Italy. At an elevation of 2332 m, its surface area is 0.03 km^{2}.
