= Lago di Poggio Perotto =

Lake in Tuscany, Italy

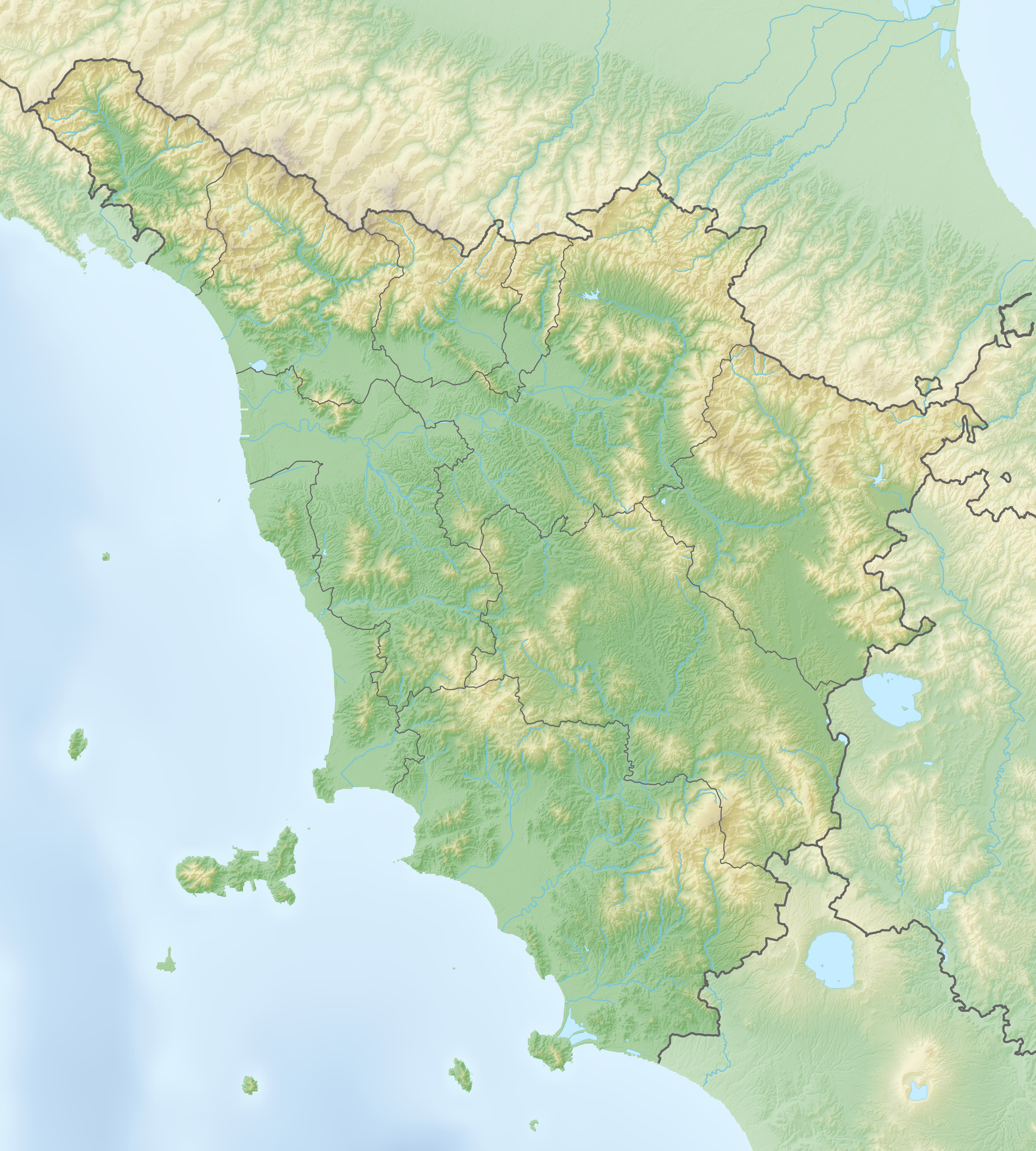
- Location within Tuscany
- Location: Province of Grosseto, Tuscany
- Coordinates: 42°36′55.00″N 11°14′55.00″E
- Primary inflows: Osa (torrente Serra)
- Primary outflows: Osa
- Basin countries: Italy
- Surface elevation: 81 m (266 ft)

Lago di Poggio Perotto is a lake in the Province of Grosseto, Tuscany, Italy.
