= Lago Olivo =

Lake in Sicily, Italy

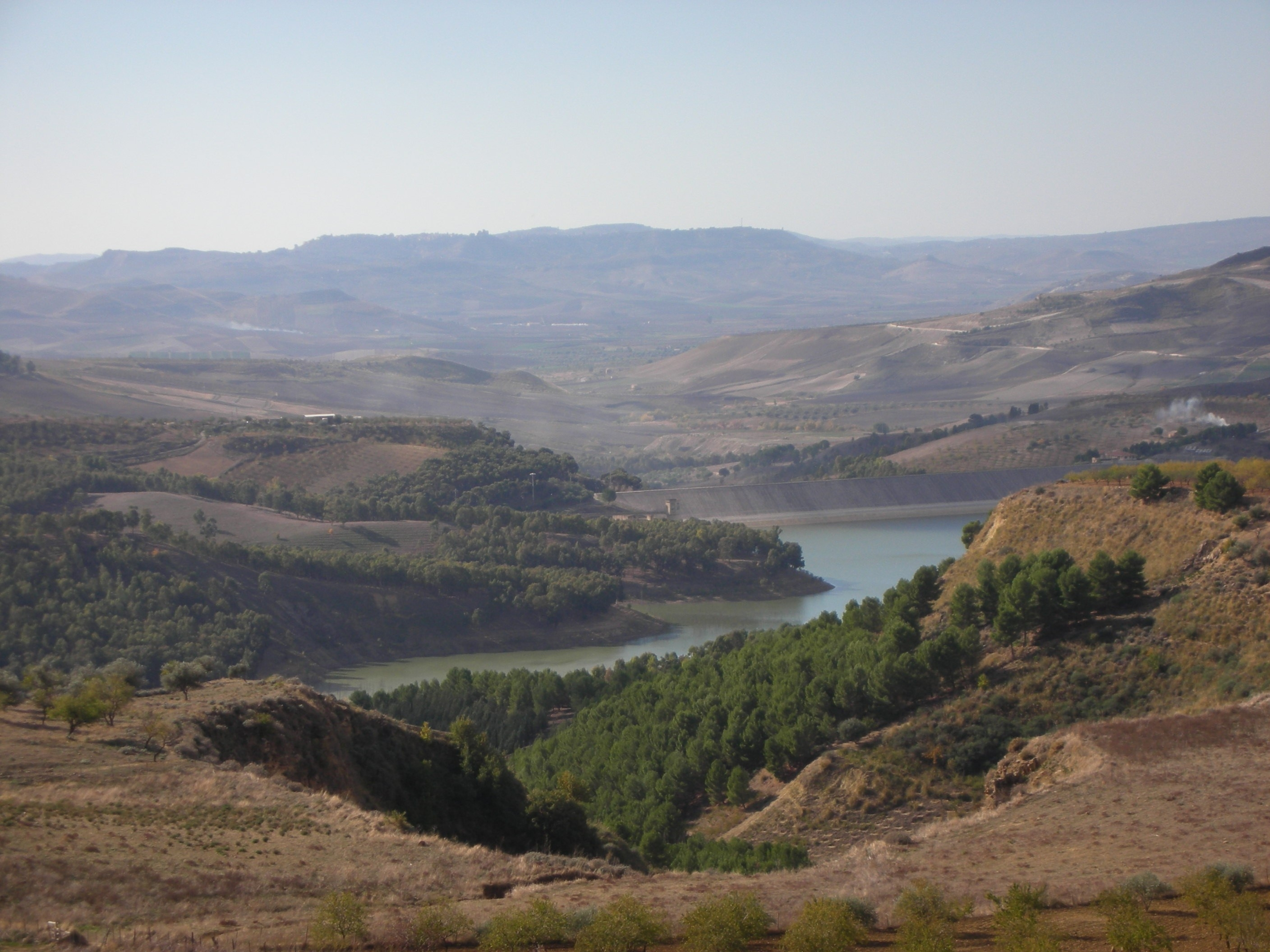

- Location within Sicily
- Location: Province of Enna, Sicily
- Coordinates: 37.409744°N 14.286947°E
- Primary inflows: Braemi
- Catchment area: 60 km^{2} (23 sq mi)
- Basin countries: Italy
- Surface area: 1.1 km^{2} (0.42 sq mi)
- Average depth: 9.1 m (30 ft)
- Max. depth: 45.4 m (149 ft)
- Water volume: 10,000,000 m^{3} (350,000,000 cu ft)
- Residence time: 1 year
- Surface elevation: 447 m (1,467 ft)

Lago Olivo (Italian for "olive tree lake" ) is an artificial lake in the Province of Enna, Sicily, Italy. It was formed in the early 1980s following the damming of the river Braemi. At an elevation of 447 m, its surface area is 1.1 km² and it has an average depth of 9.1 m.
