= Lago del Gattero =

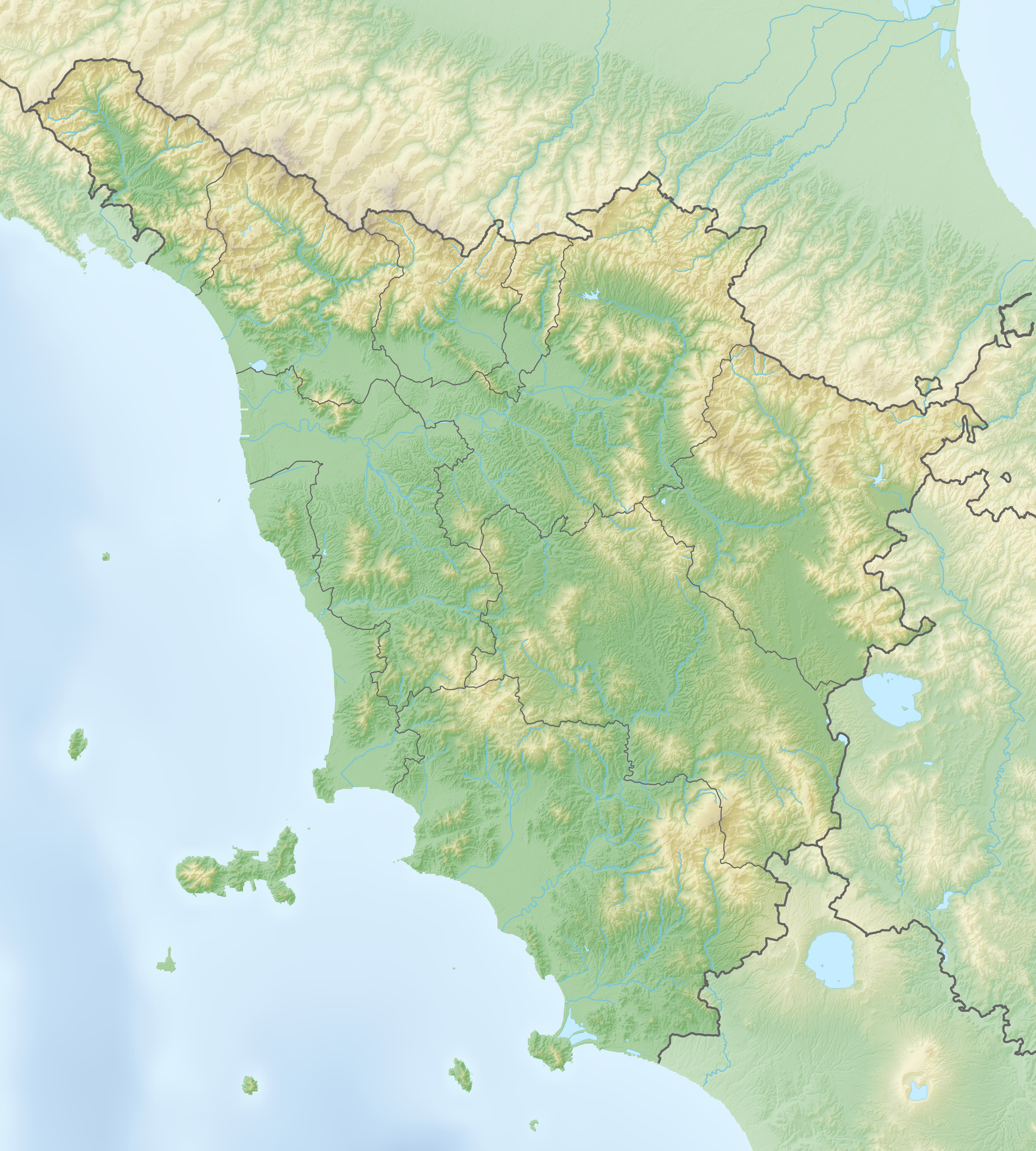
- Location within Tuscany
- Location: Province of Pisa, Tuscany
- Coordinates: 43.4895°N 10.7700°E
- Type: Reservoir
- Basin countries: Italy
- Max. length: 700 m (2,300 ft)
- Max. width: 235 m (771 ft)

Lago del Gattero is a lake in the Province of Pisa, Tuscany, Italy.
