= Campelli Lake =

Lake in Lombardy, Italy

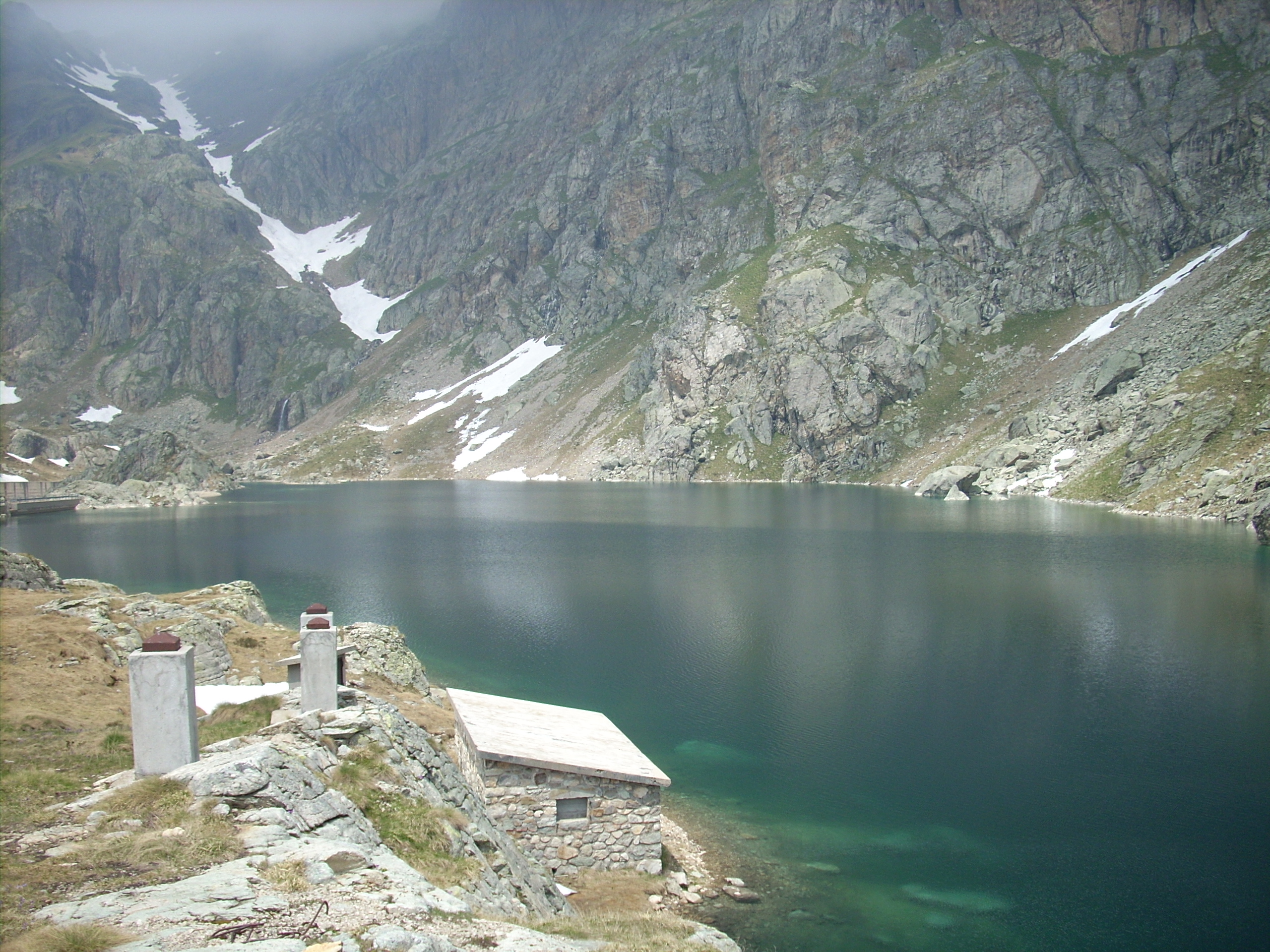

- Location within Lombardy
- Location: Province of Bergamo, Lombardy
- Coordinates: 46.004°N 9.870°E
- Basin countries: Italy
- Surface elevation: 2,036 m (6,680 ft)

Campelli Lake (Italian: Lago Campelli) is a lake in the Province of Bergamo, Lombardy, Italy. It is a popular destination for mountain hiking. It is one of a chain of artificial lakes that is linked by hiking trails. The trails also link to other sites such as Pizzo Camino.
