= Marcio Lake =

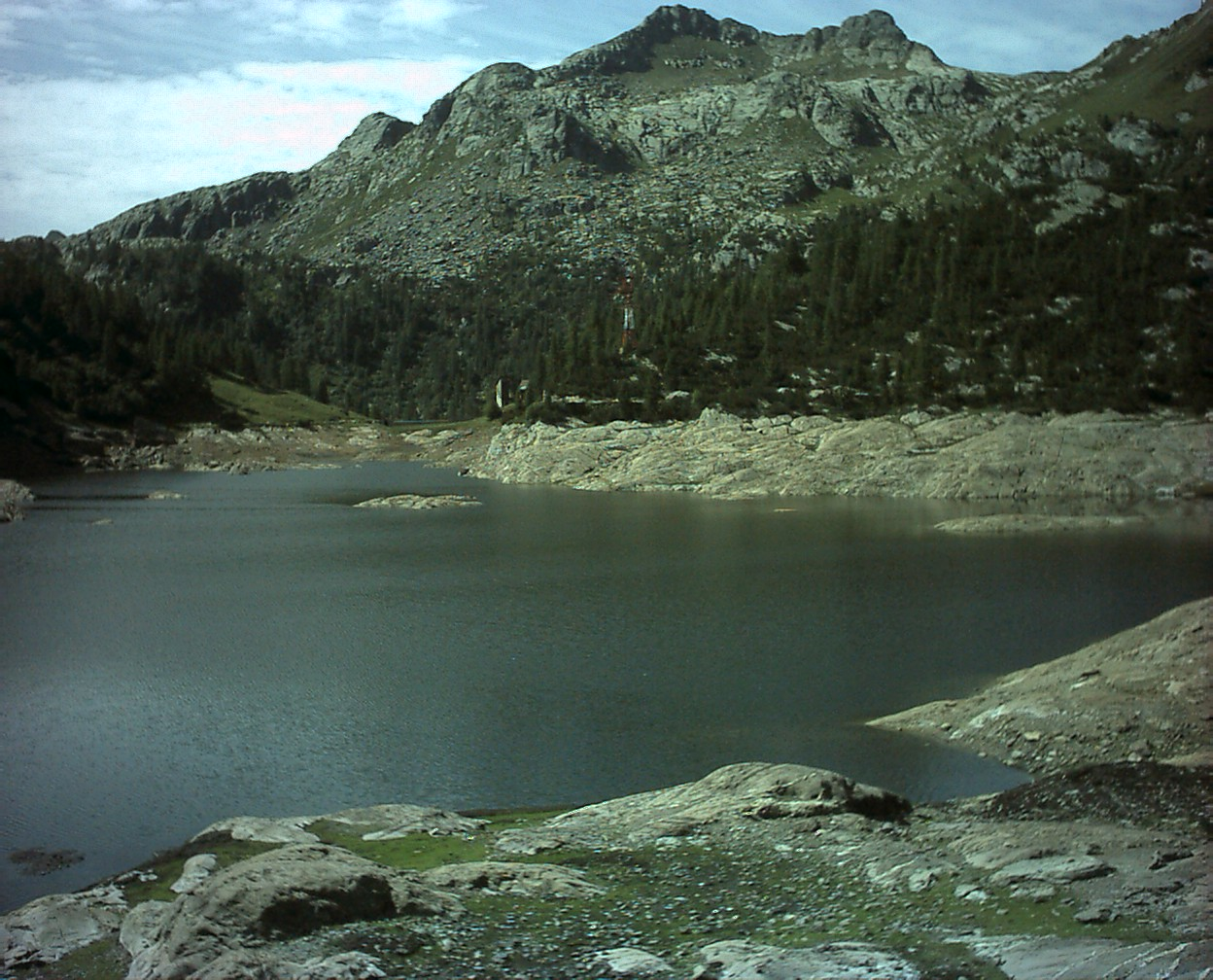

- Location within Lombardy
- Location: Province of Bergamo, Lombardy
- Coordinates: 46.002179°N 9.791672°E
- Type: Natural freshwater lake
- Basin countries: Italy
- Max. length: 560 m (1,840 ft)
- Max. width: 255 m (837 ft)
- Surface elevation: 1,841 m (6,040 ft)
- Islands: several islets

Marcio Lake is a lake in the Province of Bergamo, Lombardy, Italy.
