= Lago delle Trote =

Lake in Italy

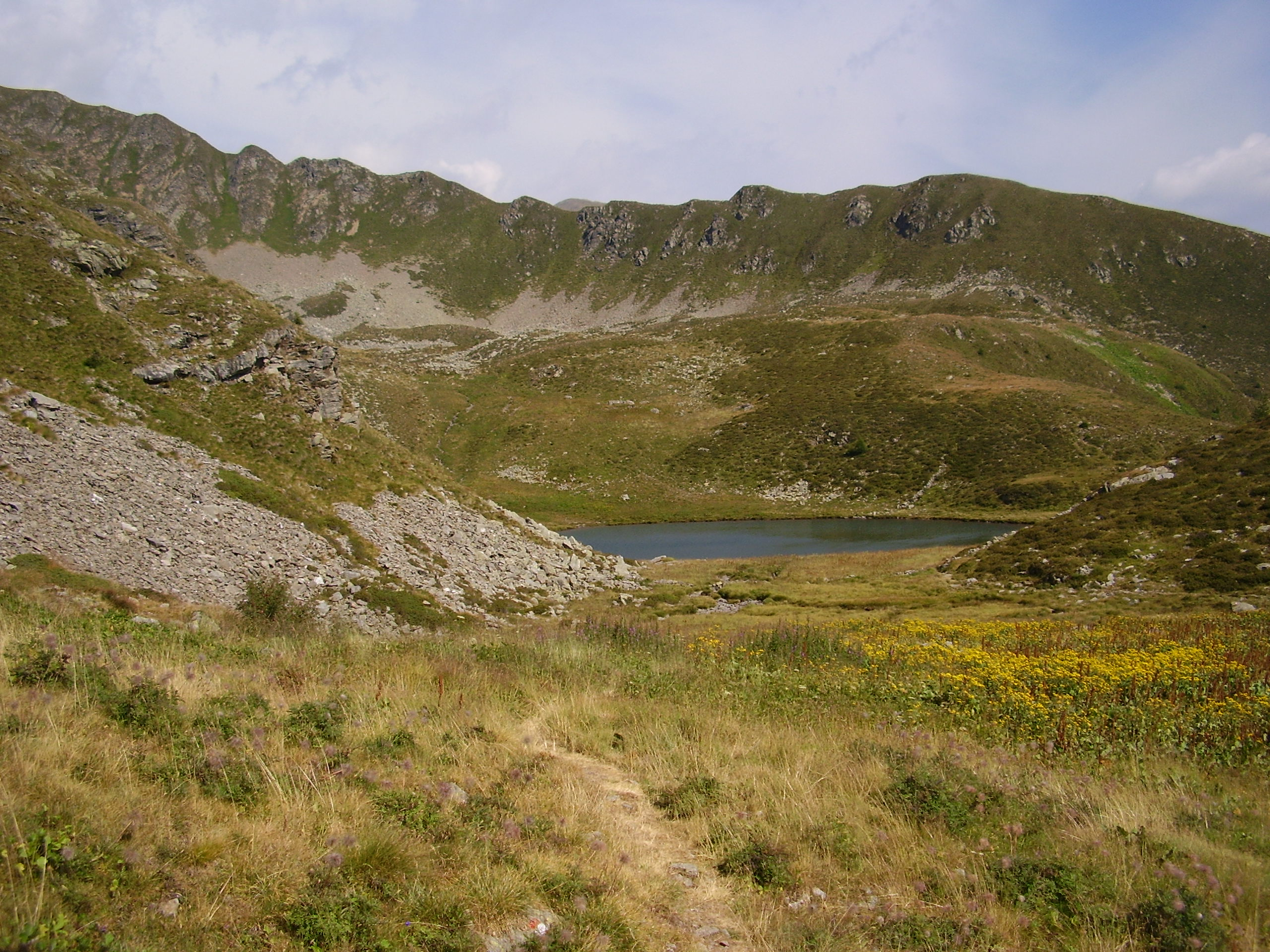

- Location within Lombardy
- Location: Province of Bergamo, Lombardy
- Coordinates: 46.051359°N 9.780385°E
- Basin countries: Italy
- Surface elevation: 2,109 m (6,919 ft)

Lago delle Trote is a lake in the Province of Bergamo, Lombardy, Italy.
