= Laghetto di Terra Nera =

Lake in Tuscany, Italy

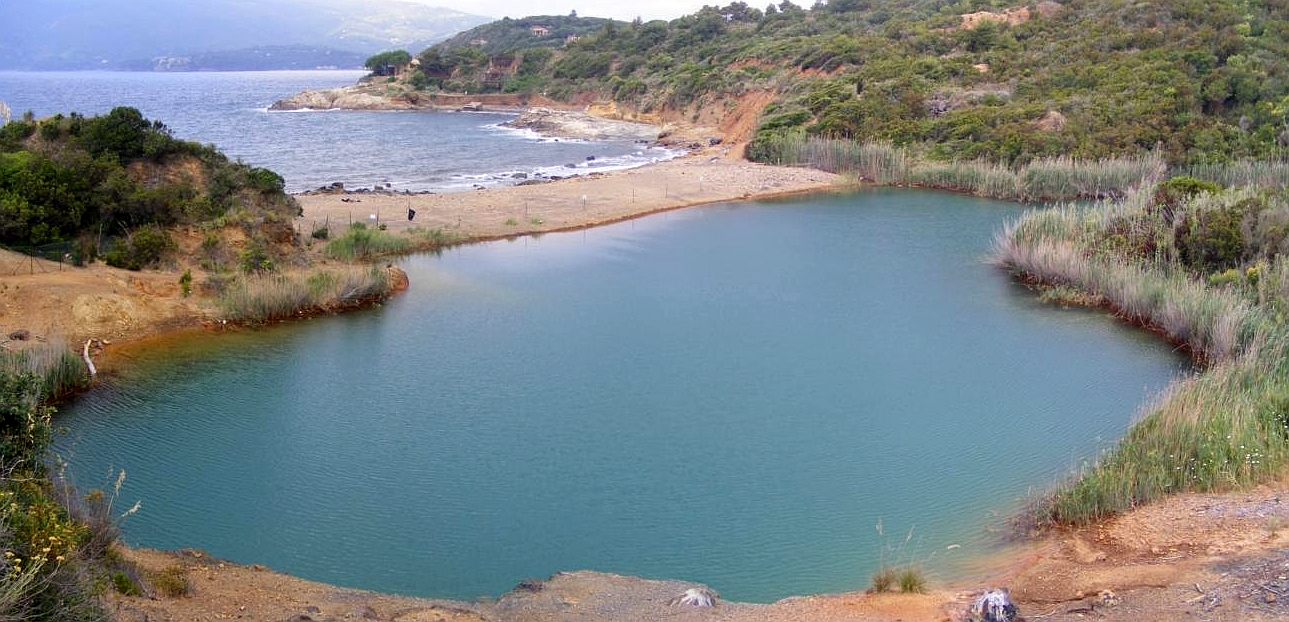

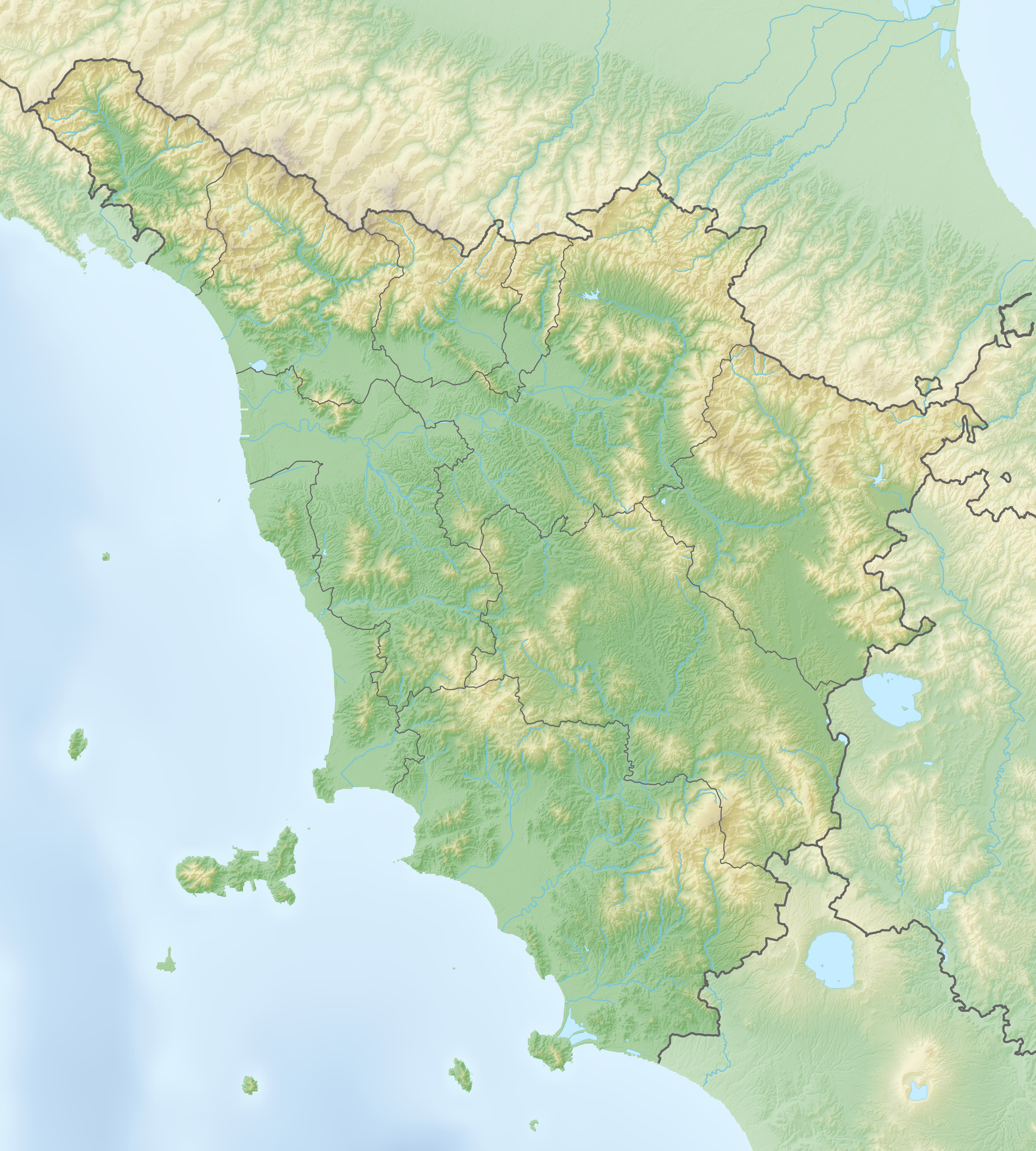
- Location within Tuscany
- Location: Province of Livorno, Tuscany
- Coordinates: 42°46′27.00″N 10°25′12.00″E
- Basin countries: Italy

Laghetto di Terra Nera is a lake on Elba in the Province of Livorno, Tuscany, Italy.
