= Lake Endine =

Reservoir in Lombardy, Italy

Coordinates: 45°47′N 9°56′E

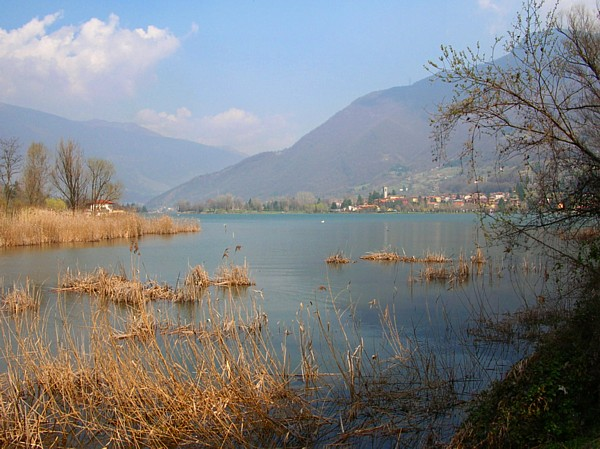

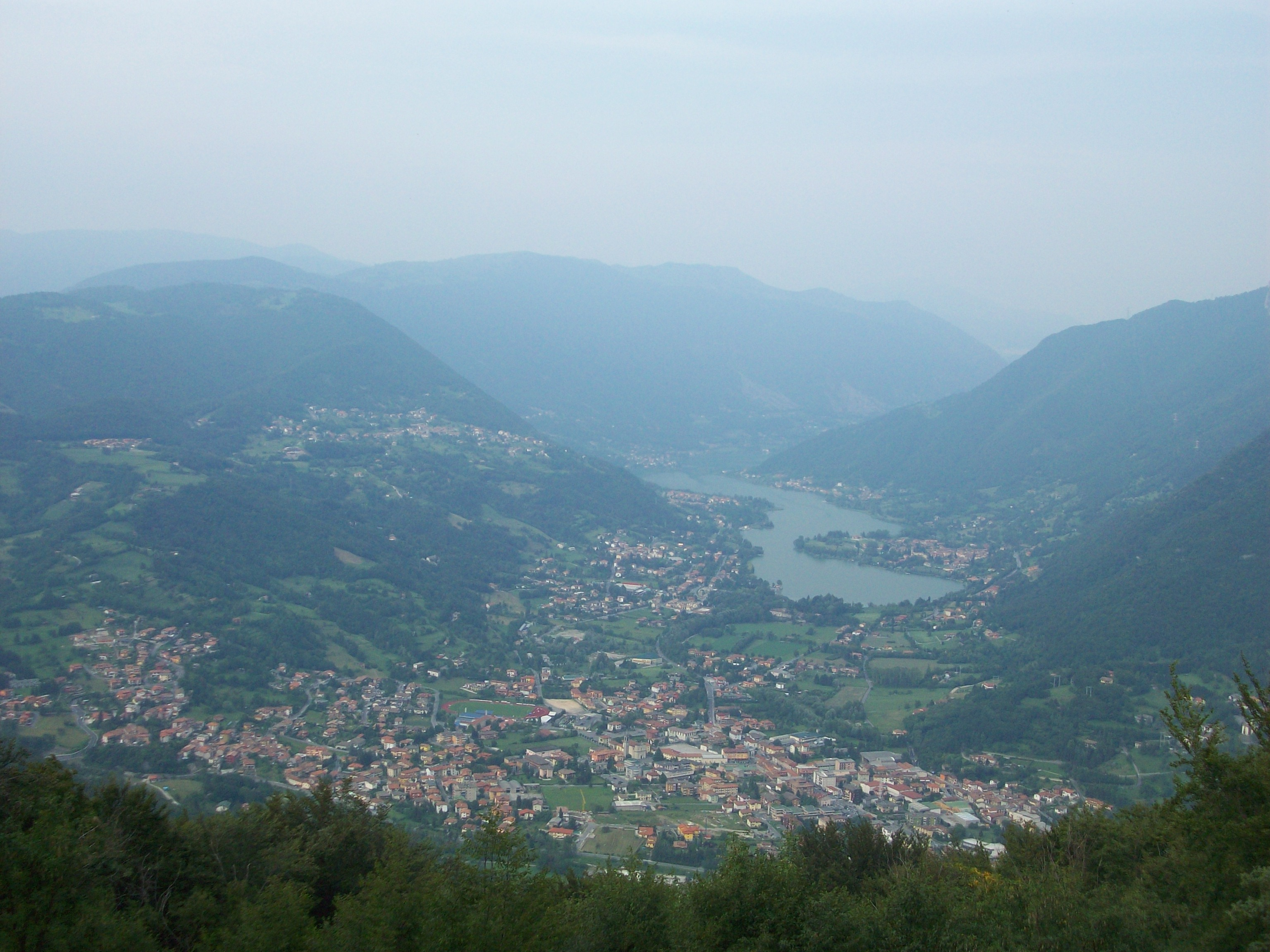

Lake Endine (Italian: Lago d'Endine) is a lake of the Province of Bergamo, Lombardy, Italy. Covering an area of 2.1 square kilometres, it is formed by the Cherio River at an altitude of 337 metres in the Val Cavallina. The lake lies in the territories of the municipalities of Endine Gaiano, Monasterolo del Castello, Ranzanico and Spinone al Lago.

The lake, set in the narrow valley between tall peaks, has preserved virtually intact the natural environment previously classified "area of remarkable environmental interest" by the authorities of the Lombardy region, subsequently promoted to park and as such subject to protection[1]. The lake banks alternate thick reeds - an ideal breeding area for the wide variety of fish and a bird haven - to small beaches densely populated during week-ends by tourists, who can picnic there in areas suitably equipped with wooden tables, waste bins, etc.

The lake water, sufficiently clear, tends to a characteristic dark green colour. On the West bank, beyond state road no. 42, the territory is highly anthropised, especially in the lower sector; the less sunny East bank, on the other hand, has few villages.

== Activities ==
The lake perimeter can be walked entirely on foot, since it is flanked on the East side by the road connecting Monasterolo del Castello to Endine Gaiano. A few kilometers north-east of this last village there is another tiny lake, lake Gaiano, no more than 200 metres long and 100 metres wide, highly renowned for fishing pike.

The nearby villages and territory do not have remarkable monuments of times past, except for the medieval castle of the Suardi, located at Bianzano, from which traffic on the lake could be controlled. Water sports are practised on the lake (sailing, windsurfing, canoeing and kayaking), as well as fishing.

Free camping is not allowed, nor is using motor boats.

Ancient donkey paths rise up from Endine Gaiano and from the right bank to Ranzanico and from there to Bianzano. The small lakeside villages have small churches rich in works of art.

In the coldest winter days the lake is covered by a thick layer of ice and it is possible to walk and in some spots to ice skate or ride a bicycle on it (although forbidden by municipal regulations due to safety reasons). Winter crossing of the frozen lake was exploited up to 19th century to cross the lake from Monasterolo at its narrowest point and reach the West bank.

== Flora ==
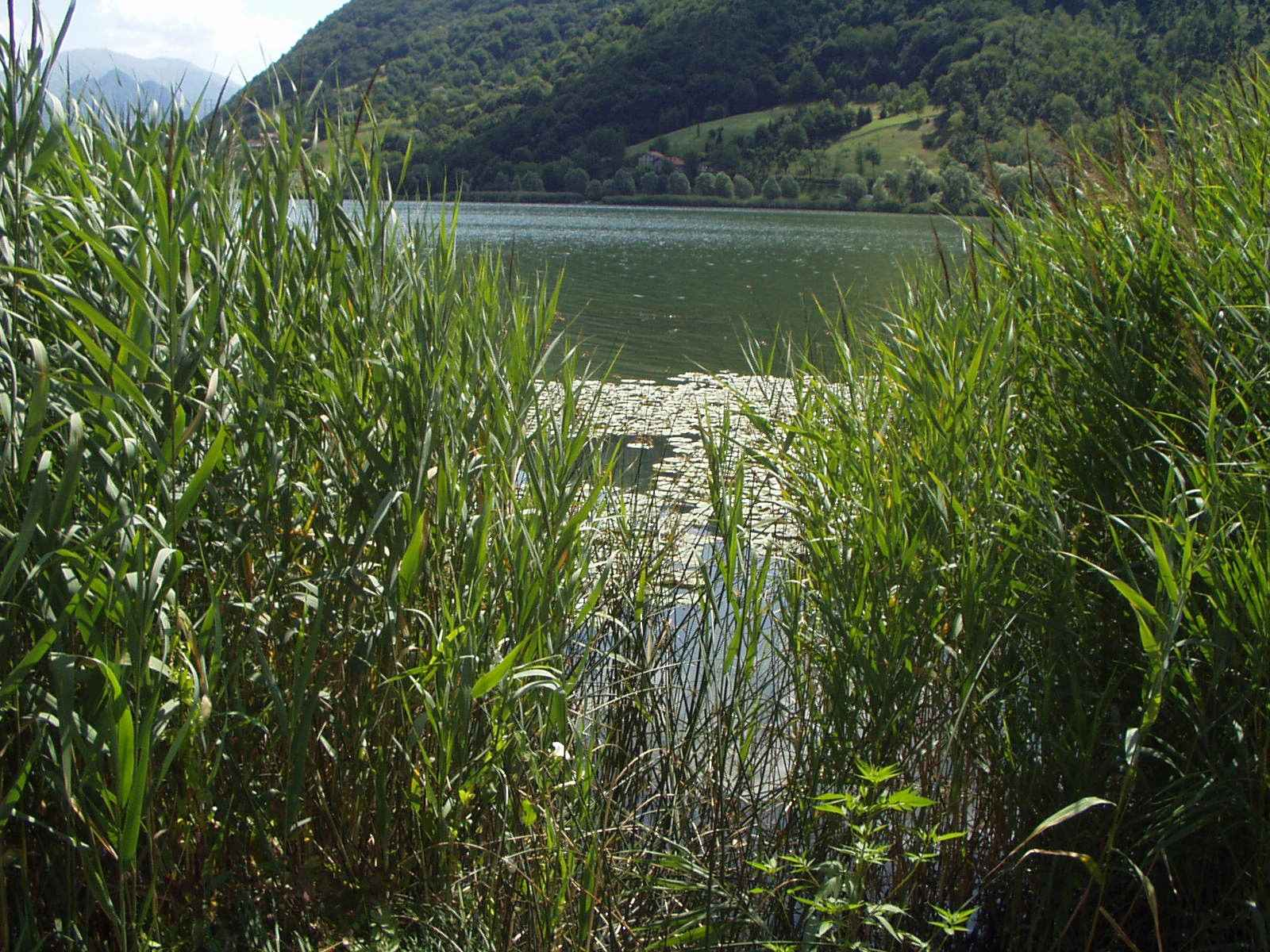
Common reed

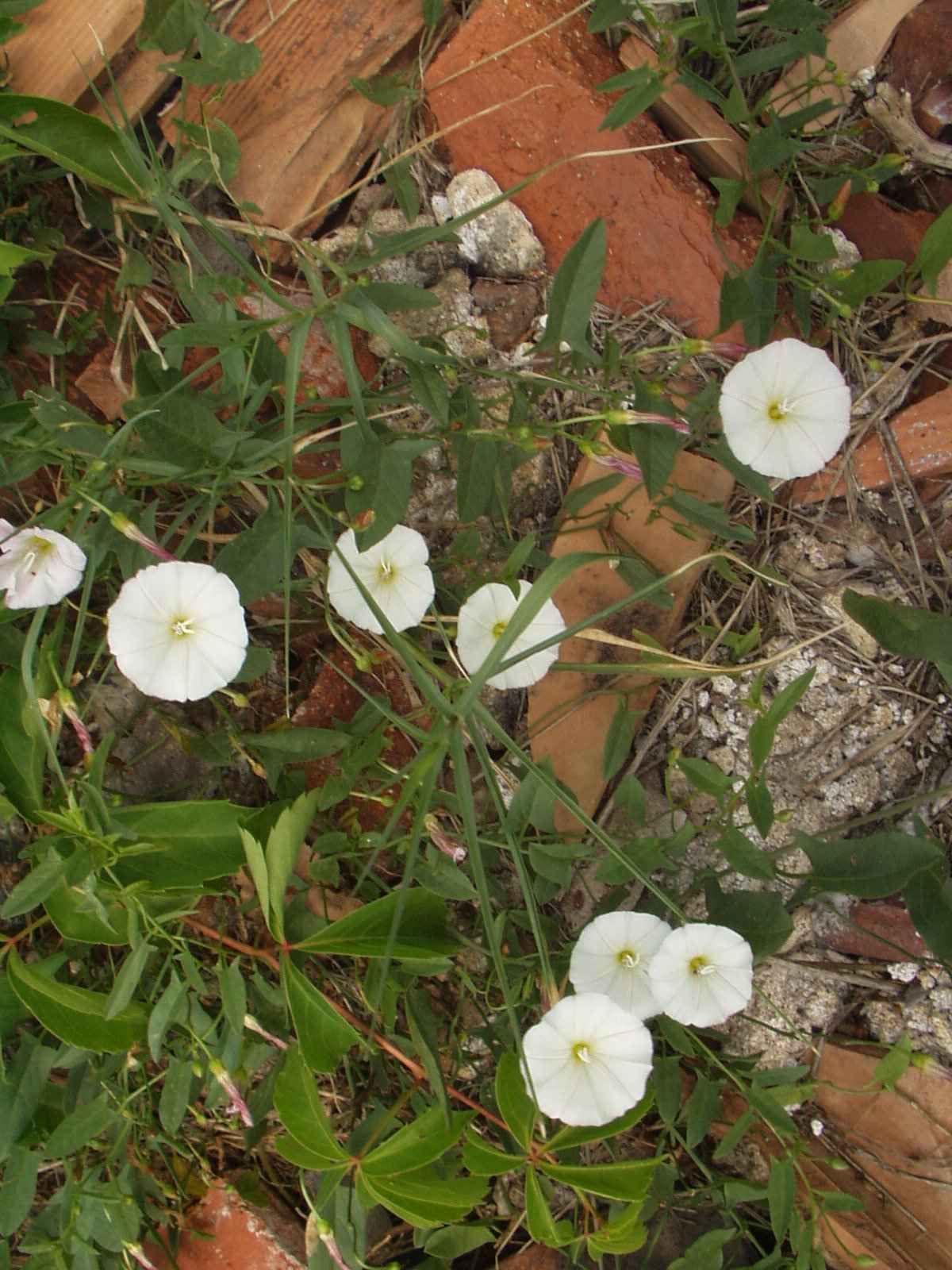
Convolvulaceae

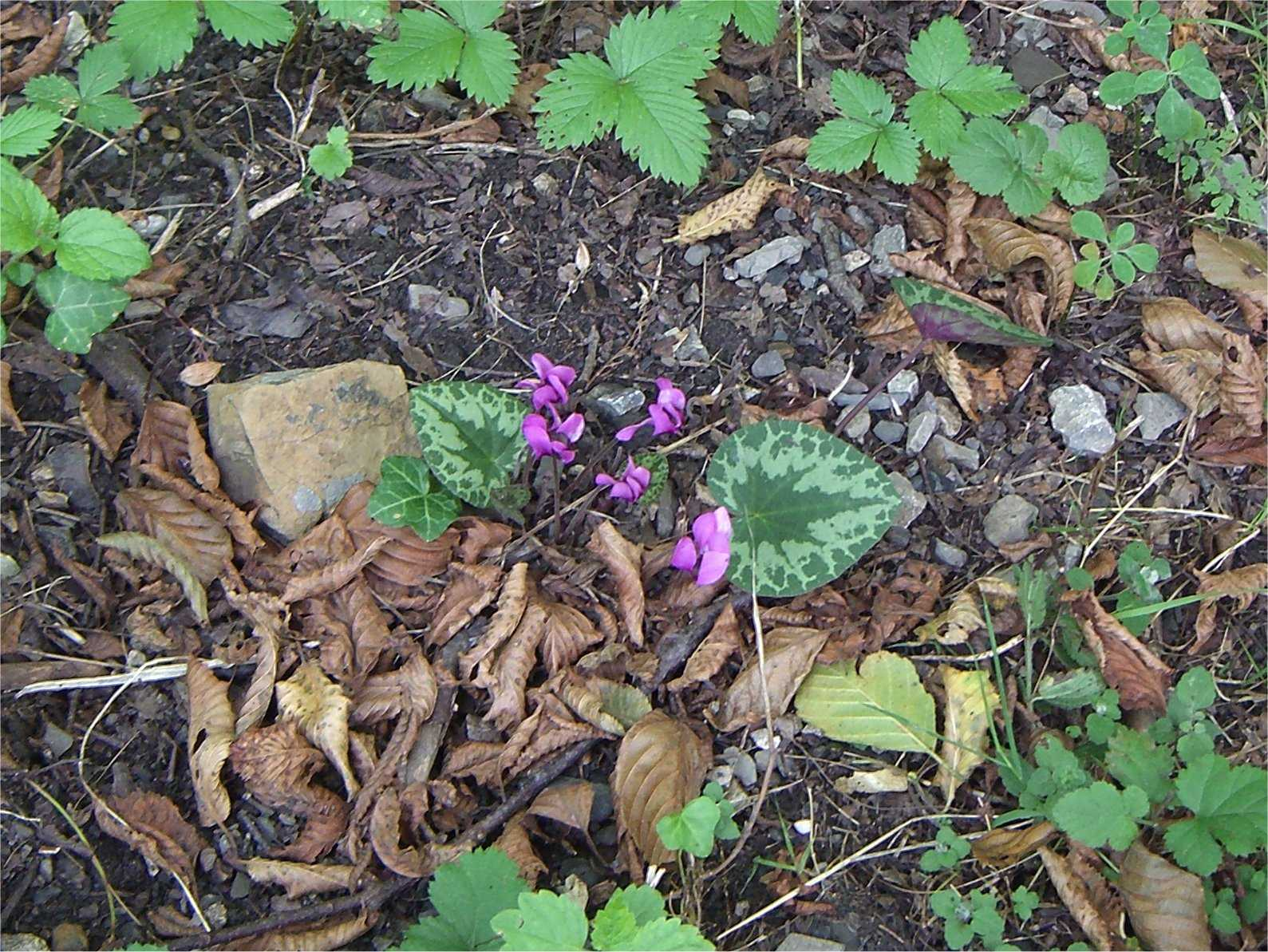
Purple cyclamen (Cyclamen purpurascens)

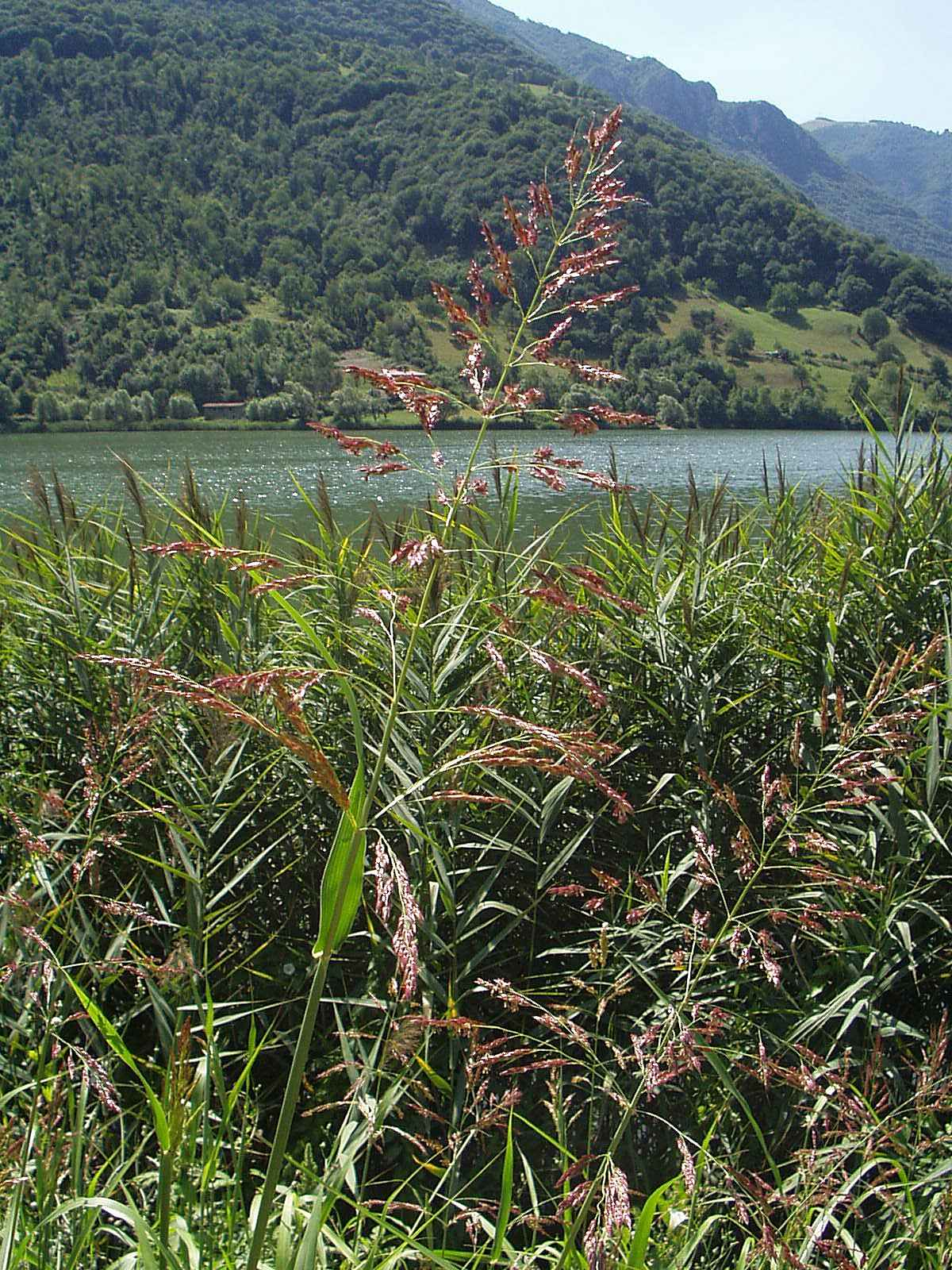
Phragmites australis

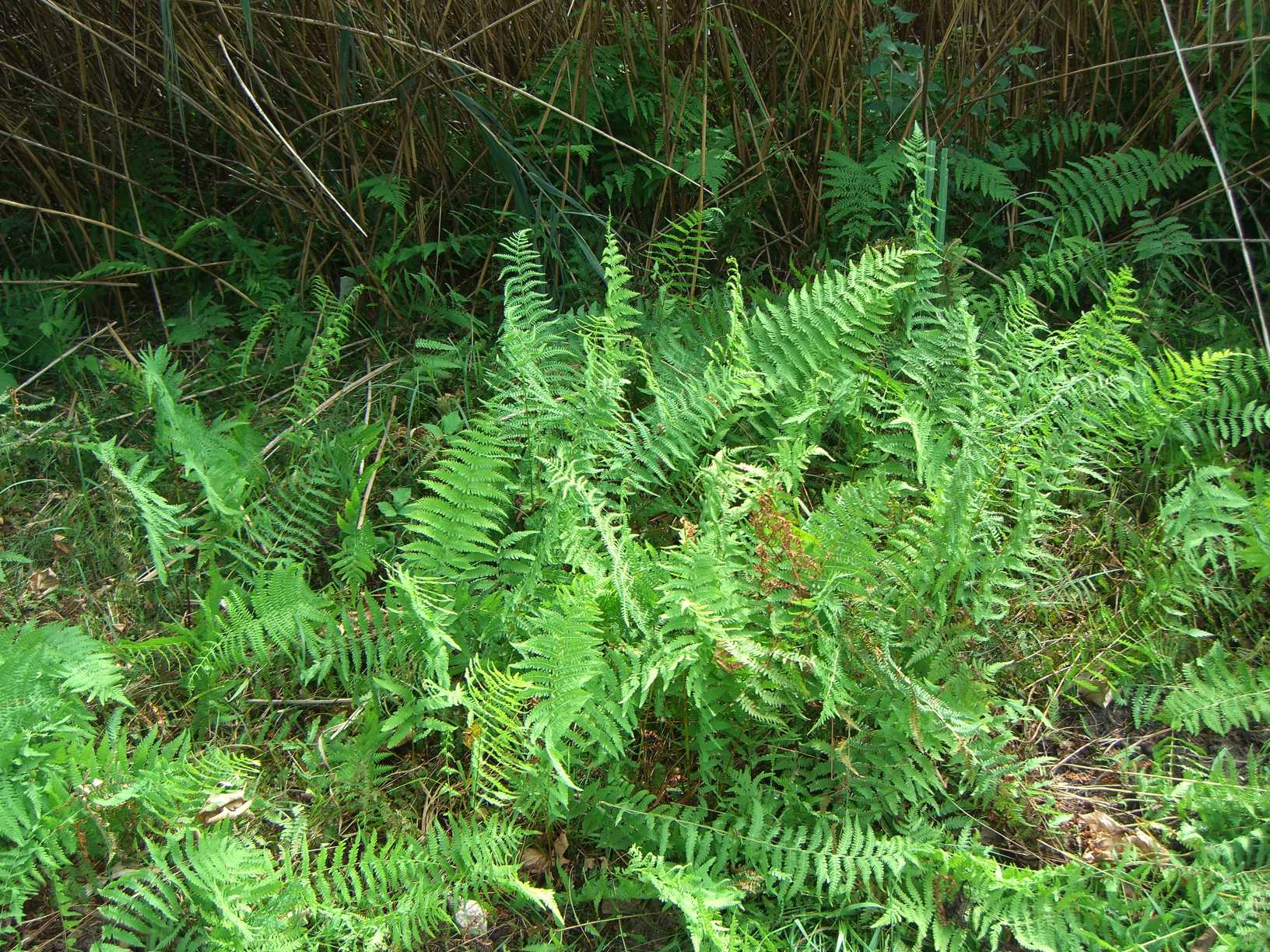
Pteridophyte

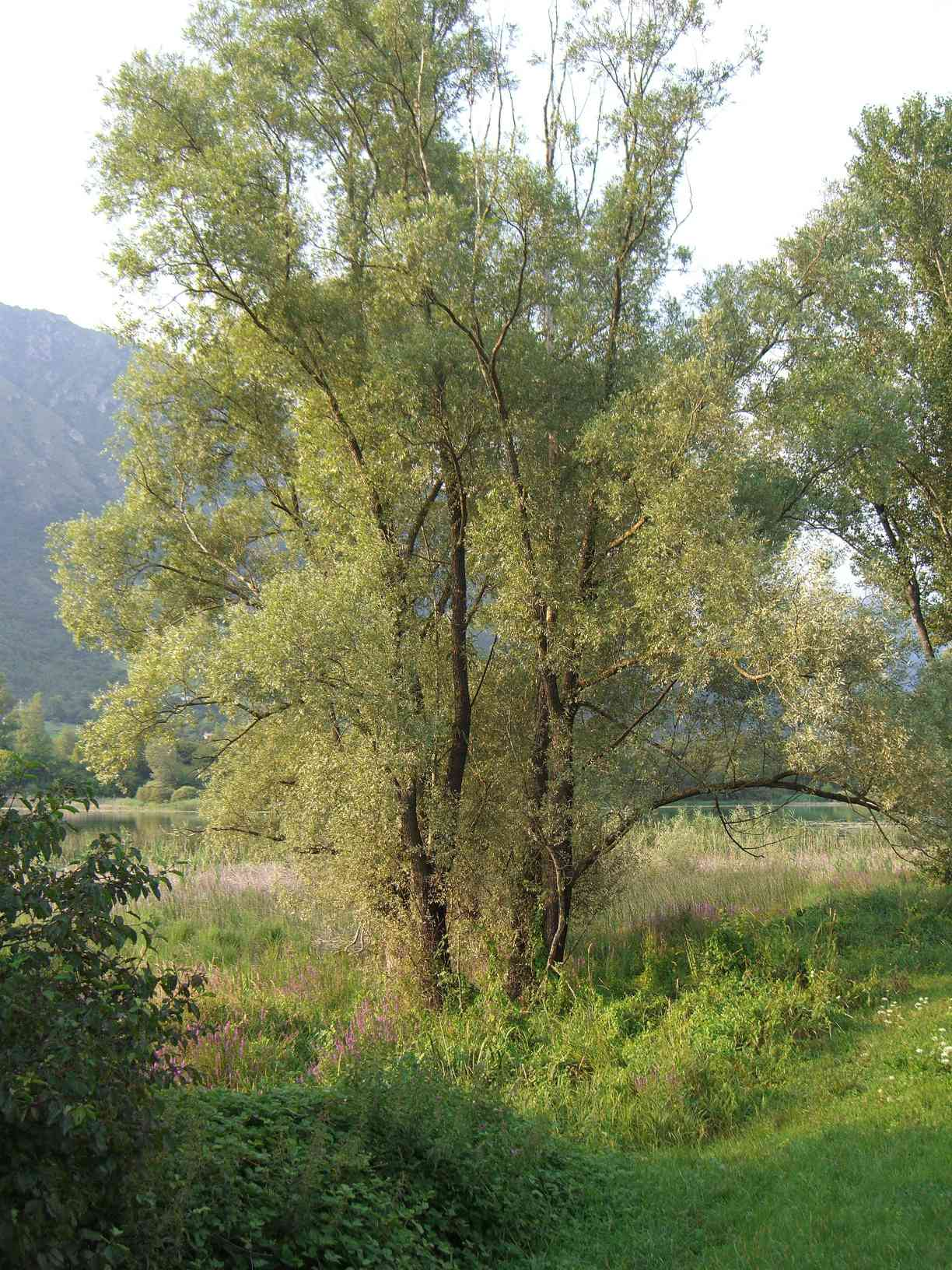
Willow

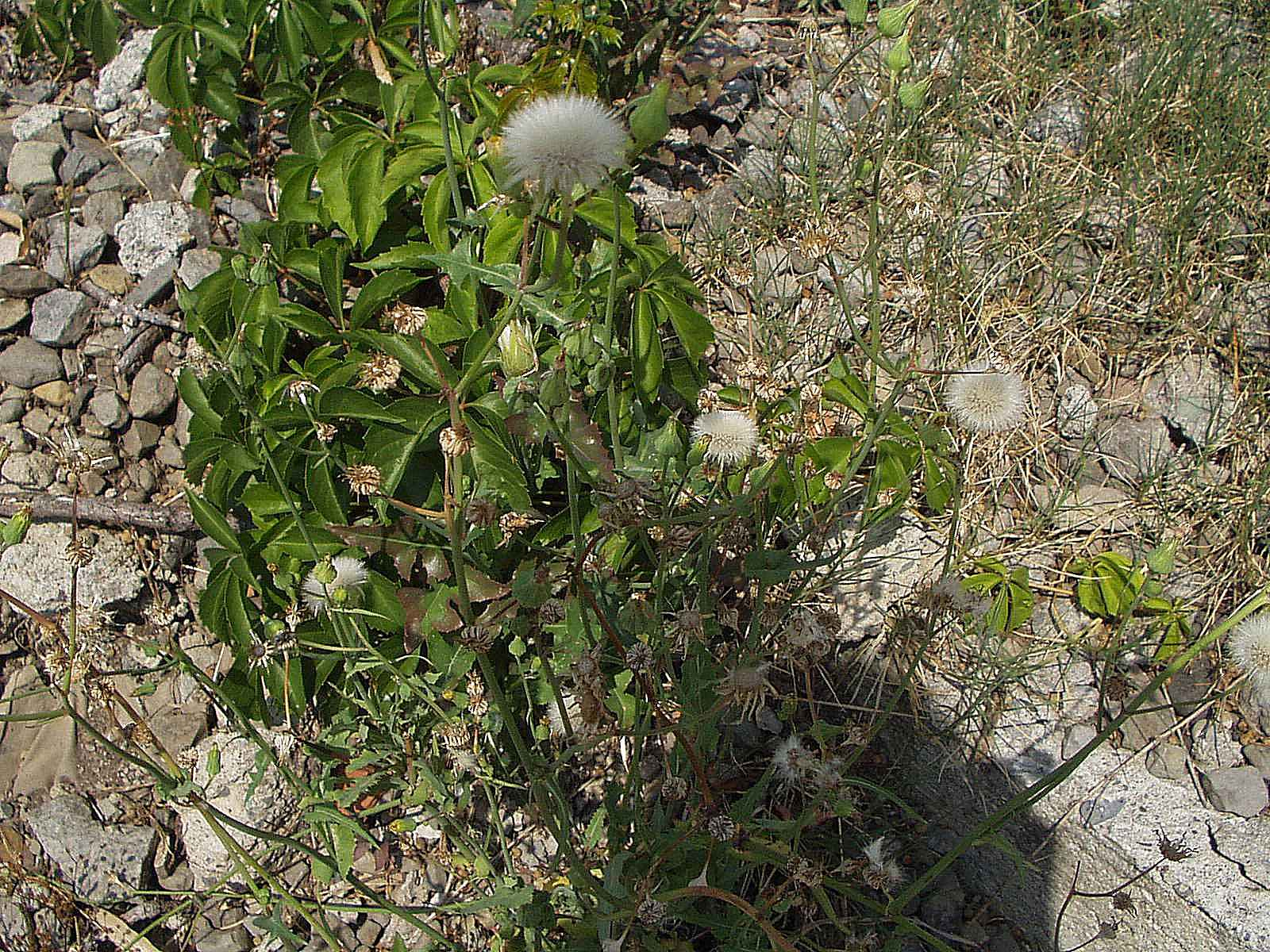
Wild flora on the western shore

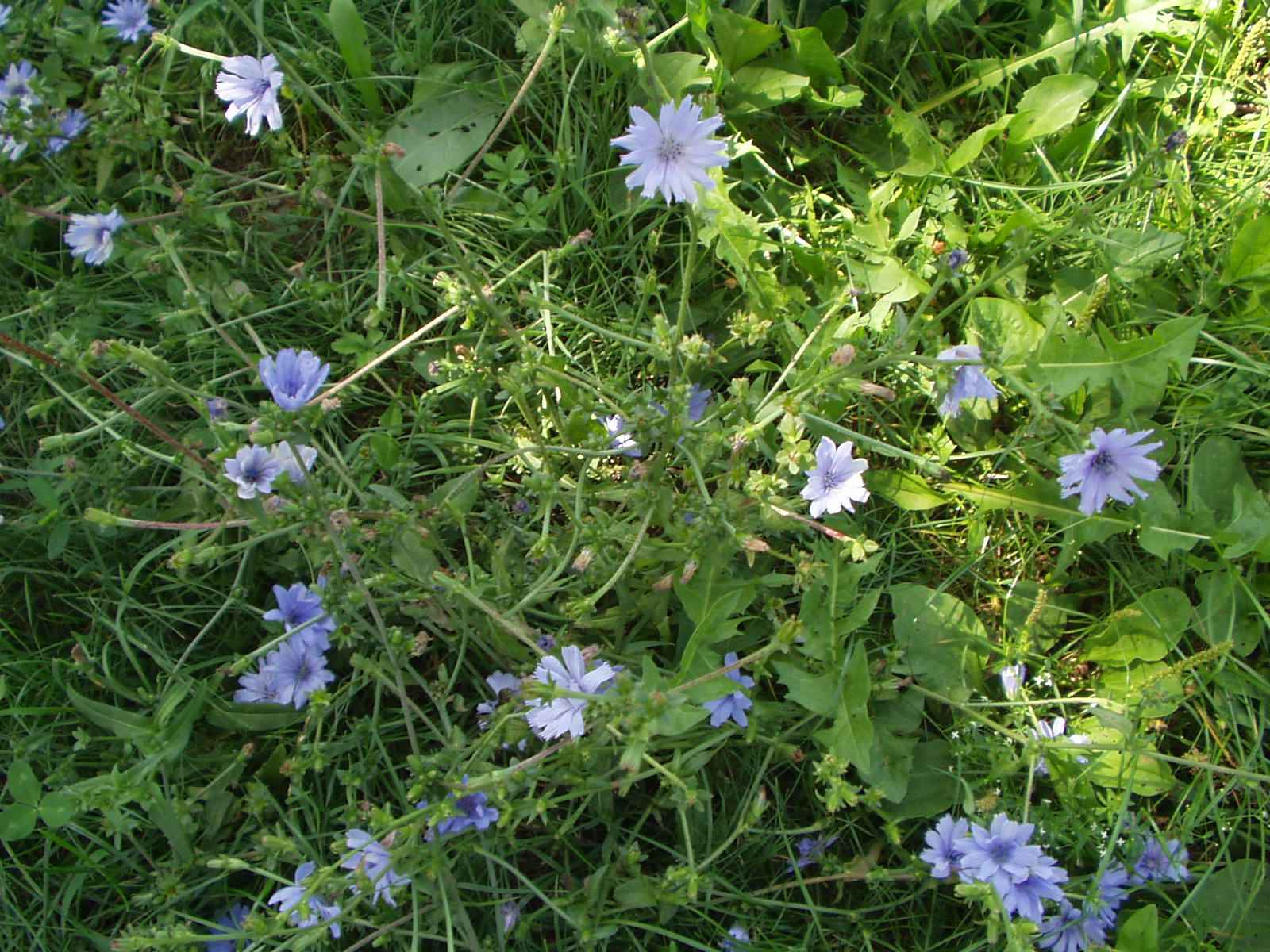
Wild flora on the western shore

== Fish fauna ==
- Alburnus arborella
- Amur bitterling
- Common rudd
- European carp
- European eel
- European perch
- Goldfish
- Italian chub
- Italian loach
- Italian nase
- Largemouth bass
- Leucos aula
- Northern pike
- Padanian goby
- Pumpkinseed
- Tench
- Vairone
- Wels catfish
- Zander

== Bird fauna ==
- African stonechat
- Barn owl
- Black kite
- Black-necked grebe
- Blackcap
- Blue tit
- Canada goose
- Carrion crow
- Cetti's warbler
- Chaffinch
- Coal tit
- Common blackbird
- Common buzzard
- Common gull
- Common (northern) house martin
- Common kingfisher
- Common pochard
- Common reed bunting
- Common reed warbler
- Coot
- Crag martin
- Egyptian goose
- Eurasian green-winged teal
- European goldfinch
- European greenfinch
- European jay
- European robin
- European serin
- Great reed warbler
- Great spotted woodpecker
- Great tit
- Grey heron
- Grey wagtail
- Hen harrier
- Hooded crow
- Lesser spotted woodpecker
- Little bittern
- Little owl
- Long-eared owl
- Long-tailed tit
- Mallard
- Mute swan
- Old World kestrel
- Osprey
- Peregrine falcon
- Poiana comune
- Short-toed snake eagle
- Song thrush
- Sprawk
- Tawny owl
- Upupa
- Western marsh harrier
- White wagtail
- Wood nuthatch

== See also ==
- Italian Lakes
- List of lakes of Italy
