= Suardi (surname) =

Suardi is a surname. Notable people with the surname include:

- Luciano Suardi, an Argentine actor
- Bramantino, a Milanese artist born as Bartolomeo Suardi
- Emilio Suardi (1905 – 1983), Italian politician and partisan
- Fabrizio Suardi (1585 – 1638), Roman Catholic prelate
- Giambattista Suardi (1711 – 1767), Italian mathematician
- Guiscardo Suardi (?-1282), Roman Catholic prelate
- Vincenzo Agnello Suardi (1582 – 1644), Roman Catholic prelate

== See also ==
- Suardi (disambiguation)
- Suardi (dynasty)
