= Peia =

- Comune
- Comune di Peia
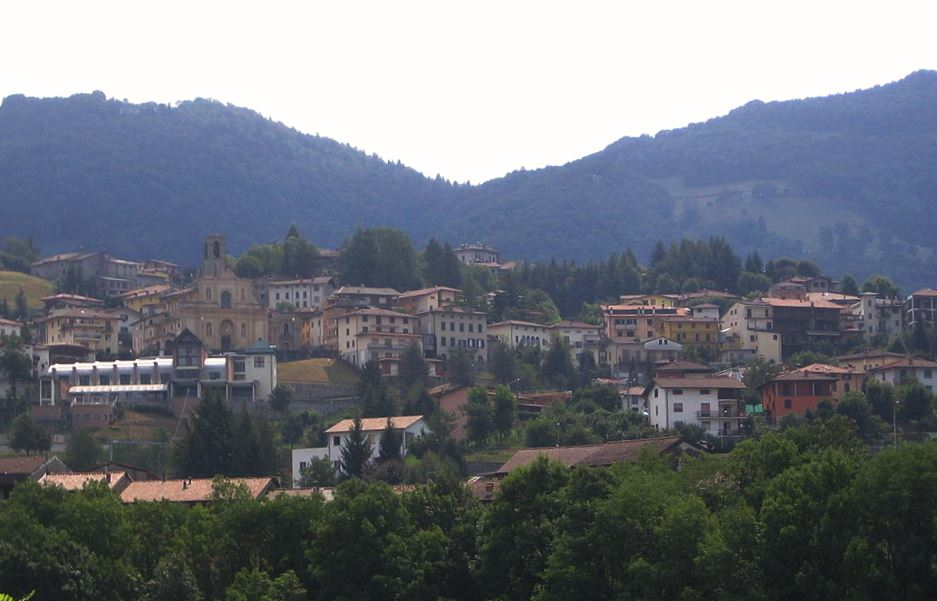
- Peia

- Location within Italy Location within Lombardy
- Coordinates: 45°48′N 9°54′E
- Country: Italy
- Region: Lombardy
- Province: Province of Bergamo (BG)
- Frazioni: Peia Bassa, Cima Peia

Area
  - Total: 4.4 km^{2} (1.7 sq mi)
- Elevation: 570 m (1,870 ft)

Population (Dec. 2004)
  - Total: 1,817
  - Density: 410/km^{2} (1,100/sq mi)
- Demonym: Peiesi
- Time zone: UTC+1 (CET)
  - Summer (DST): UTC+2 (CEST)
- Postal code: 24020
- Dialing code: 035

Peia (Bergamasque: Pèa) is a comune (municipality) in the Province of Bergamo in the Italian region of Lombardy, located about 70 kilometres (43 mi) northeast of Milan and about 20 kilometres (12 mi) northeast of Bergamo. As of 31 December 2004, it had a population of 1,817 and an area of 4.4 square kilometres (1.7 mi^{2}).

The municipality of Peia contains the frazioni (subdivisions, mainly villages and hamlets) Peia Bassa and Cima Peia.

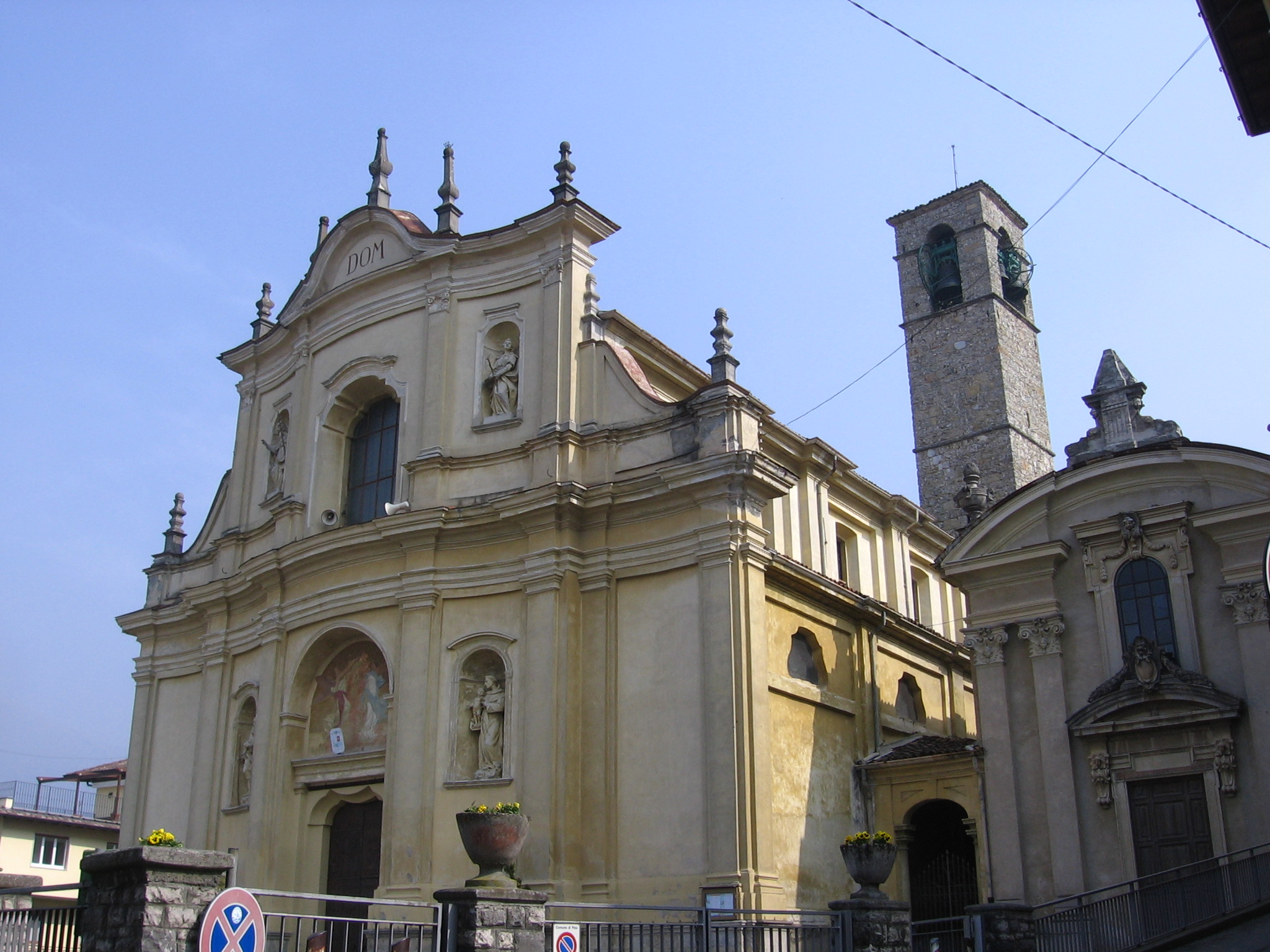
Parish church of sant'Antonio da Padova

Peia borders the following municipalities: Bianzano, Gandino, Leffe, Ranzanico.

== Demographic evolution ==
Historical population

Year	Pop.	±%
1861	1,157	—
1871	1,185	+2.4%
1881	1,210	+2.1%
1901	1,410	+16.5%
1911	1,530	+8.5%

Year	Pop.	±%
1921	1,498	−2.1%
1931	1,388	−7.3%
1936	1,330	−4.2%
1951	1,514	+13.8%
1961	1,577	+4.2%

Year	Pop.	±%
1971	1,705	+8.1%
1981	1,663	−2.5%
1991	1,746	+5.0%
2001	1,761	+0.9%

Source: Data from ISTAT
