= Suardi (disambiguation) =

Suardi is a present-day commune in Italy.

It may also refer to:

Places

- Suardi, Argentina
- Suardi Castle near Bianzano, Italy
- Suardi Chapel

People

- Suardi (dynasty), a Ghibelline-allied family in medieval Bergamo
- Suardi (surname), Italian surname
