= Gandino =

- Comune
- Comune di Gandino
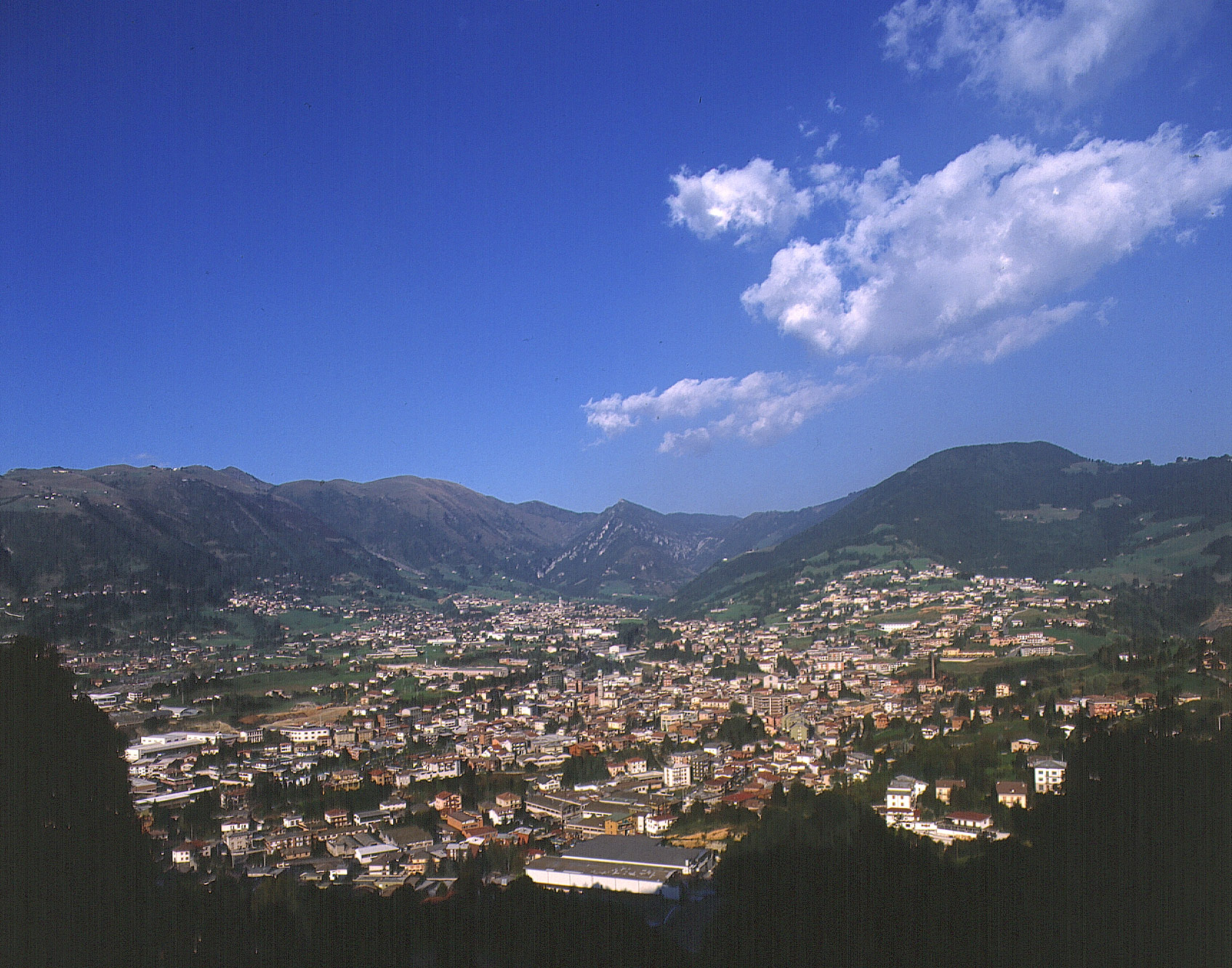
- Gandino

- Location within Italy Location within Lombardy
- Coordinates: 45°49′N 9°54′E
- Country: Italy
- Region: Lombardy
- Province: Bergamo (BG)
- Frazioni: Barzizza, Cirano

Area
  - Total: 29.1 km^{2} (11.2 sq mi)
- Elevation: 553 m (1,814 ft)

Population (30 April 2017)
  - Total: 5,423
  - Density: 186/km^{2} (483/sq mi)
- Demonym: Gandinesi
- Time zone: UTC+1 (CET)
  - Summer (DST): UTC+2 (CEST)
- Postal code: 24024
- Dialing code: 035
- Website: Official website

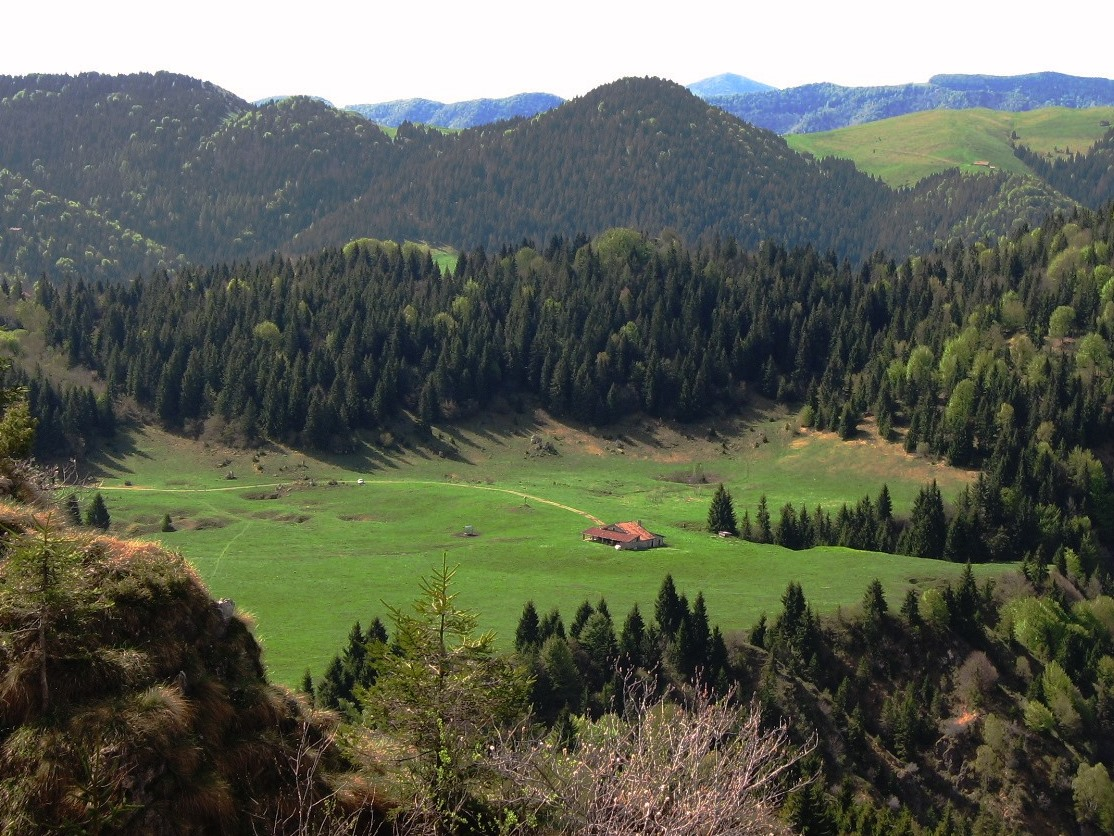
The Field of Avene, where finds of the Upper Paleolithic were found

Gandino (Bergamasque: Gandì) is a comune (municipality) in the Province of Bergamo in the Italian region of Lombardy, located about 70 kilometres (43 mi) northeast of Milan and about 20 kilometres (12 mi) northeast of Bergamo.

Gandino borders the following municipalities: Casnigo, Cazzano Sant'Andrea, Cerete, Clusone, Endine Gaiano, Leffe, Peia, Ponte Nossa, Ranzanico, Rovetta, Sovere.

== Notable people ==
- Lorenzo Frana, Vatican diplomat, museum founder

== See also ==
- Lake Leffe
