= Spinone al Lago =

- Comune
- Comune di Spinone al Lago
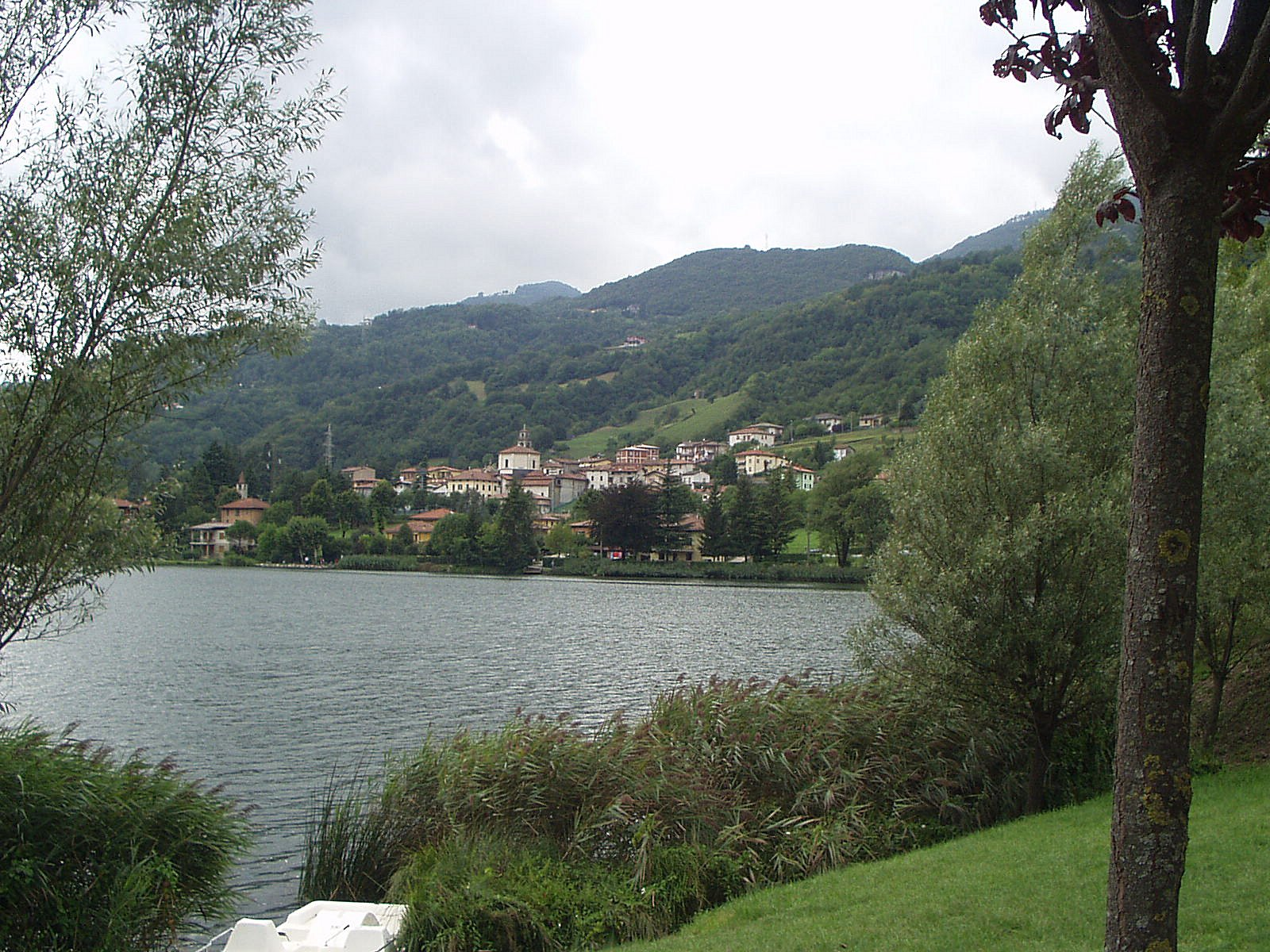

- Coat of arms

- Location within Italy Location within Lombardy
- Coordinates: 45°45′N 9°55′E
- Country: Italy
- Region: Lombardy
- Province: Bergamo (BG)

Government
  - Mayor: Marco Terzi

Area
  - Total: 2.0 km^{2} (0.77 sq mi)
- Elevation: 360 m (1,180 ft)

Population (2010)
  - Total: 1,039
  - Density: 520/km^{2} (1,300/sq mi)
- Demonym: Spinonesi
- Time zone: UTC+1 (CET)
  - Summer (DST): UTC+2 (CEST)
- Postal code: 24060
- Dialing code: 035

Spinone al Lago (Bergamasque: Spinù) is a comune (municipality) in the Province of Bergamo in the Italian region of Lombardy, located about 70 kilometres (43 mi) northeast of Milan and about 20 kilometres (12 mi) northeast of Bergamo, on the left bank of the Lake Endine.

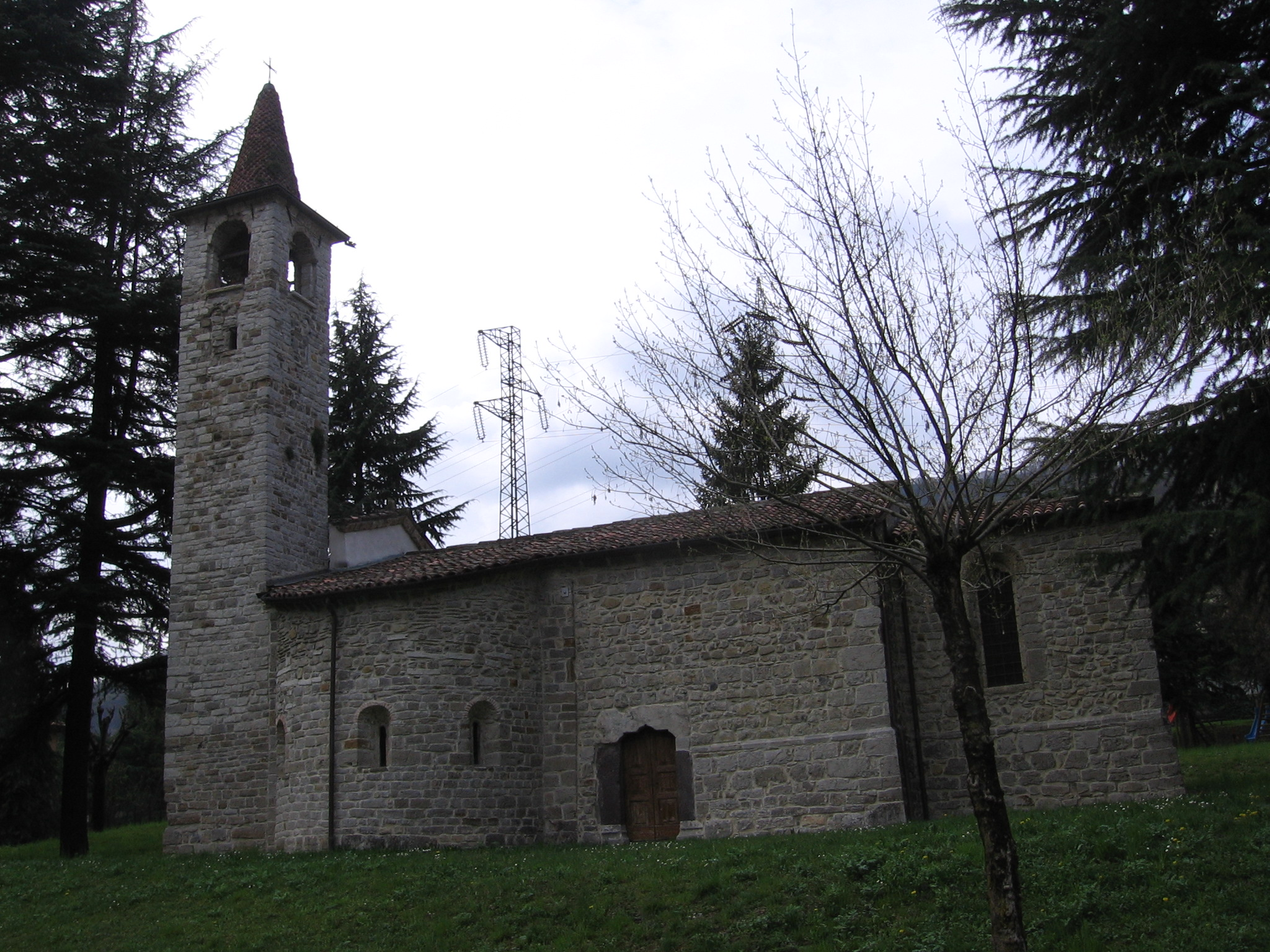
Sanctuary of San Pietro in Vincoli.

It is home to the 11th century Romanesque sanctuary of San Pietro in Vincoli, restored during the 14th and 15th centuries. The bell tower dates to the 16th century. The interior has some remains of 15th-century frescoes.

Spinone al Lago borders the following municipalities: Bianzano, Casazza, Gaverina Terme, Monasterolo del Castello, Ranzanico.
