= Lorenzo Frana =

Italian priest

Lorenzo Frana, also known as Renzo Frana, (13 October 1926 – 7 November 2005) was an Italian priest of the Catholic Church who was the Permanent Observer of the Holy See to UNESCO from 1975 to 2002

== Biography ==
Lorenzo Frana was born in Gandino (Bergamo), Italy. He attended a technical school and earned a diploma as an expert dyer. After being ordained a priest, in order to prepare for a diplomatic career, he entered the Pontifical Ecclesiastical Academy in 1959. His early assignments as a member of the diplomatic service of the Holy See included stints as auditor in Great Britain and as chargé d’affaires in the United States.

In 1975 Pope Paul VI named him Permanent Observer of the Holy See to UNESCO. (Note: Though one Vatican document refers to him as "Archbishop Lorenzo Frana", there is no evidence he was ever appointed or consecrated a bishop. Other sources that would have noted that fact if true do not.) Throughout his tenure in that position he invited a variety of Church prelates to head the Holy See's delegation to UNESCO's annual meeting, either an Apostolic Nuncio, an official of the Secretariat of State, or a senior official of the Roman Curia. Frana allowed himself to take this role only once. In anticipation of his retirement the next year, he delivered the Holy See's principal address to a UNESCO meeting in October 2001. His tenure as Permanent Observer ended with the appointment of his successor on 11 May 2002. (Note: The day before naming Frana's successor, Pope John Paul II greeted Frana by his title and thanked him for his years of service in an address to an association of lay Catholics that supported the Church's engagement with the organization.)

He retired to Gandino where he died in a retirement home on 7 November 2005, at the age of 79.

Frana was an expert on sacred art. He organized an exhibit for UNESCO of crèche figures and then used it as the basis for a museum established in his home town in 1989: il Museo del presepio in Gandino.
