= Permanent Observer of the Holy See to UNESCO =

Diplomatic mission

The Permanent Observer of Holy See to UNESCO is the representative of the Holy See to the United Nations Educational, Scientific and Cultural Organization (UNESCO), which is based in Paris. The Church also has representatives at the headquarters of the United Nations in New York and at the headquarters of a number of its other international bodies in Geneva and Nairobi.

The first to hold the position was Angelo Roncalli, who was also the Nuncio to France and a titular archbishop. (Note: He was also soon to become a cardinal (1953) and then Pope John XXIII (1958).) Only one of his successors, Paolo Bertoli, has held those titles while serving as Permanent Observer. His immediate successor was typical of most: a priest who only became nuncio and archbishop when given his next assignment as Apostolic Nuncio to Costa Rica.

== List of permanent observers ==
- Angelo Roncalli (9 June 1952 – 12 January 1953) (Note: Roncalli's term as Permanent Observer ended when Pope Pius XII made him a cardinal and appointed him Patriarch of Venice in January 1953. The ceremonies creating him a cardinal took several days. On 12 January Roncalli received his cardinal's biretta in Paris while Pius proclaimed him a cardinal in Rome at the consistory's first session. Pius announced the Venice appointment at another session of the consistory on 15 January.)
- Giuseppe Sensi (16 May 1953 – 21 May 1955) (Note: Sensi's term as Permanent Observer ended when he was named a titular archbishop and Nuncio to Costa Rica, though one source dates the end of his service as 1956.)
- Felice Pirozzi (26 June 1955 – 23 September 1960)
- Angelo Pedroni (4 November 1960 – 7 April 1965) (Note: He is identified as Permanent Observer in February 1965 and is named a titular archbishop and Apostolic Delegate to Thailand and Laos on 7 April 1965.)
- Giovanni Benelli (1964 – 1966)
- unknown
- Luigi Conti (9 August 1971 – 5 August 1975)
- Lorenzo Frana (13 August 1975 – 11 May 2002) (Note: Pope John Paul II called Frana the Permanent Observer the day before he named Follo to the post.)
- Francesco Follo (11 May 2002 – 11 November 2021)
- Eric Soviguidi (11 November 2021 – 15 August 2025)
- Roberto Campisi (27 September 2025 – present)

== See also ==
- Foreign relations of the Holy See
- List of diplomatic missions of the Holy See
