= Lake Leffe =

Extinct Pleistocene lake in Lombardy, Italy

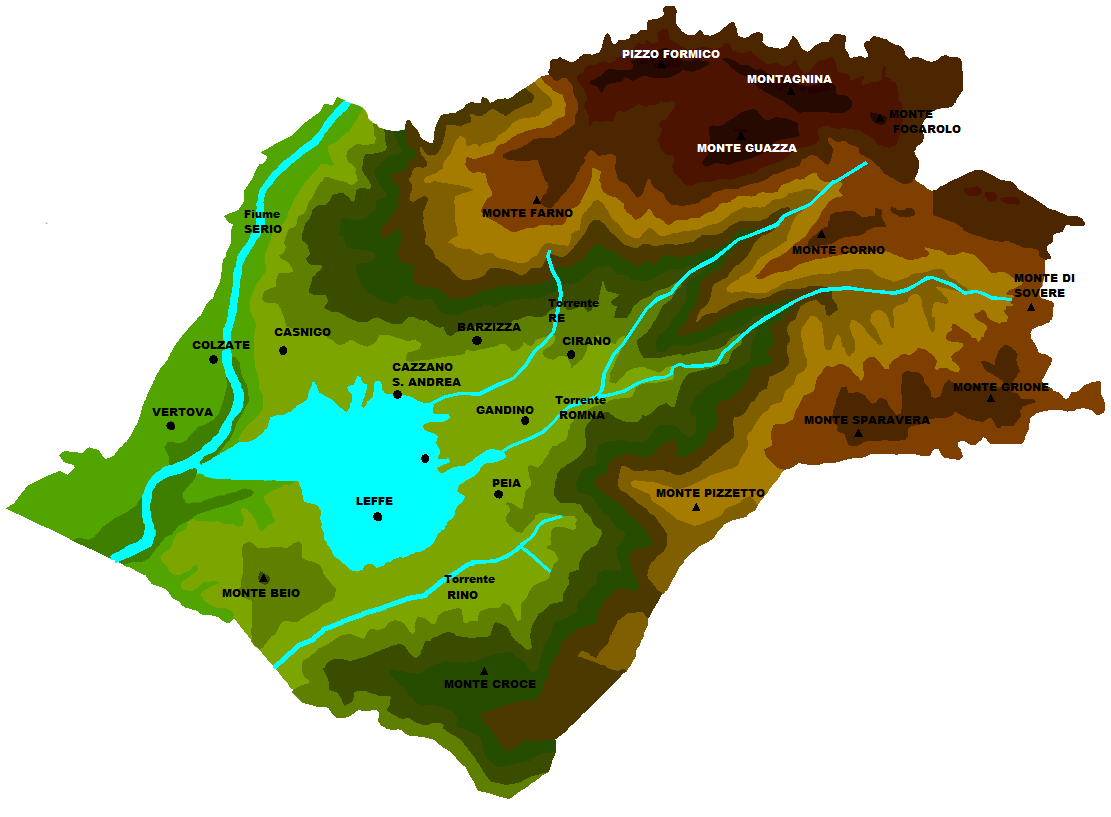
- Map of Lake Leffe during its maximum extent

- Location within Italy
- Location: Leffe, Gandino, Cazzano Sant'Andrea, Casnigo, Province of Bergamo, Lombardy, Italy
- Coordinates: 45°48′N 9°54′E
- Primary inflows: Romna, Re
- Max. length: 1 km (0.62 mi)
- Max. width: 4.4 km (2.7 mi)
- Surface area: 4.2 km^{2} (1.6 sq mi)
- Surface elevation: 500 m (1,600 ft)

The Lake Leffe was a Pleistocene lake, located in the present-day Val Gandino, in the Province of Bergamo.

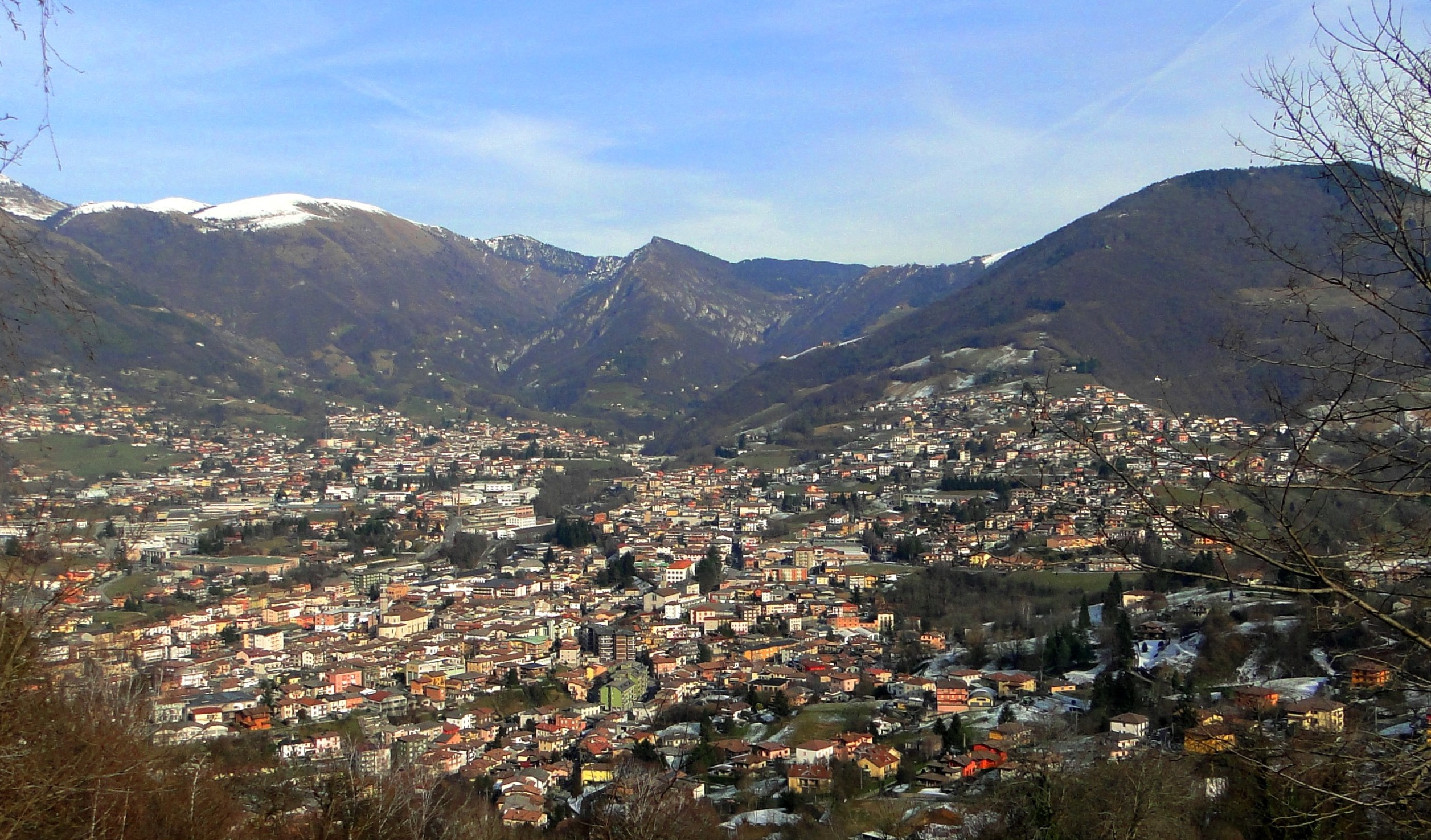
The natural amphitheater of Val Gandino, where Lake Leffe was situated

The history of Lake Leffe can be traced back to the first phase of the Pleistocene, about 1,800,000 years ago. Its presence is clearly demonstrated both by the current geological conformation of Val Gandino, clearly visible from the surrounding heights, and by the analysis of the subsoil, rich in layers of clay, lacustrine carbonates, and lignite, formed due to the sedimentation of aquatic plants.

The creation was made possible by the barrier that formed at the terminal part of the Romna stream, which at that time flowed into the Serio through a paleovalley (now completely covered by debris) located where the Casnigo cemetery currently stands, opposite the settlement of Colzate. The mouth was obstructed by the deposition of materials carried by the Serio, also causing a backflow of the waters brought downstream by the Romna. Another theory suggests that the formation of the lake was due to the movement of the faults that make up the Pizzo Formico, which, due to tectonic activity, allowed the lowering of the rocky substrate.

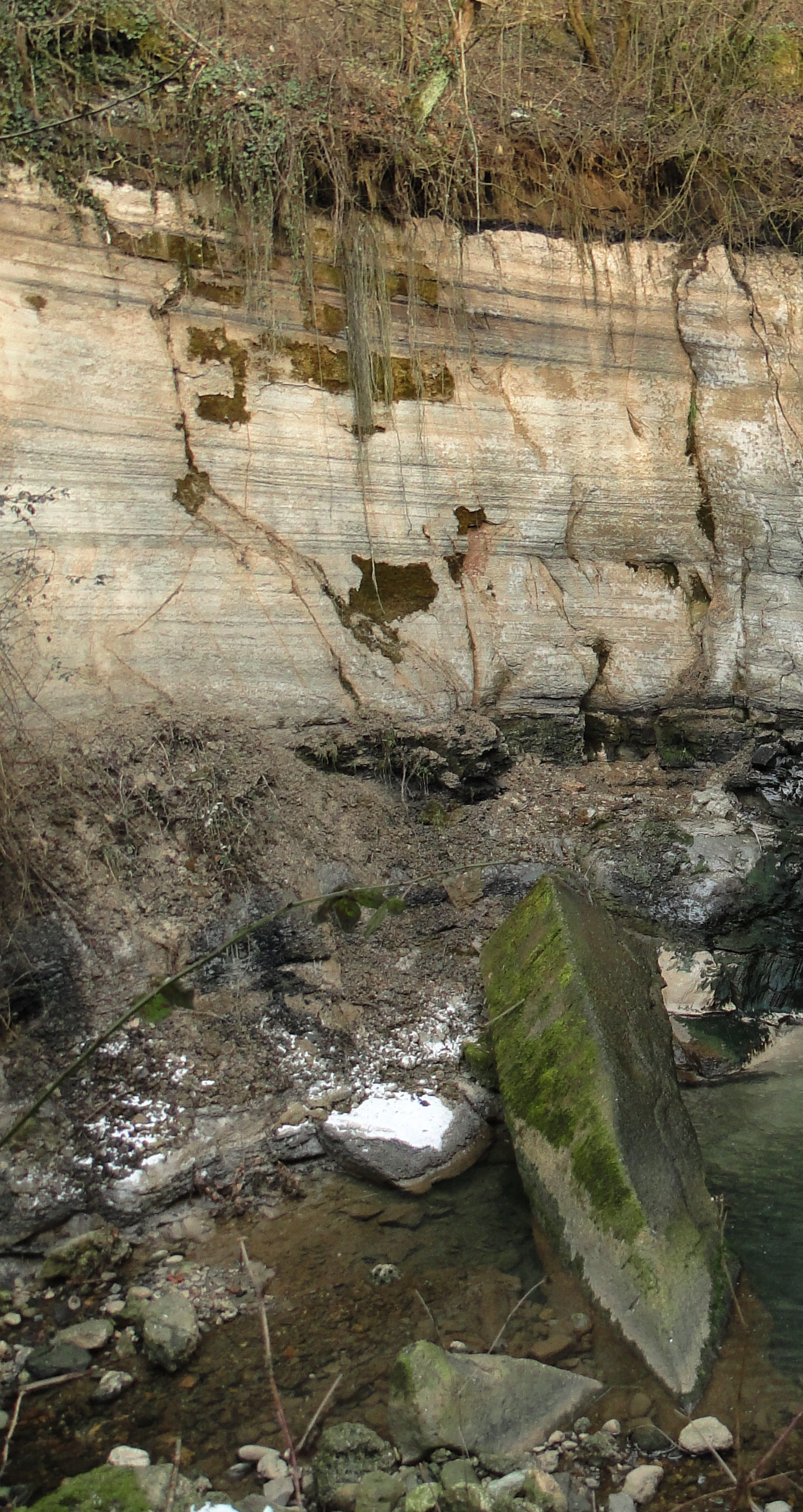
Outcrops of lacustrine carbonates near the Re stream (Cazzano Sant'Andrea)

The lakebed, initially at the same level as the rest of the Val Seriana, began to slowly accumulate debris, rising by about 130 meters in the basin dominated by the Farno and Formico, a level that still characterizes the Val Gandino plateau. At its maximum expansion, it covered an area of 4.2 km², a maximum width of 4.4 kilometers, and a maximum depth of 20–30 meters.

Its tributaries were the streams of the Piana and Concossola valleys, which currently merge to form the Romna, and the Re stream, while the Rino stream, unlike today, directed its course toward the San Rocco saddle, thus flowing into the basin of the Valle Rossa.

This closed basin existed for 800,000 years, accumulating a significant number of fossil remains that have allowed the reconstruction of many of the life forms present in those remote times. These range from fossilized plants, lacustrine shells, and animal fossils, the first discoveries of which date back to the period between the end of the 18th century and the beginning of the 19th century, as documented by the scientist Giovanni Maironi da Ponte.

Numerous scholars, including Giuseppe Balsamo Crivelli, Emilio Cornalia, Ferdinando Sordelli, Antonio Stoppani, and other researchers from the Milan Civic Natural History Museum, were attracted by the large quantity of fossil material, leading them to repeatedly visit the local lignite mines, enabling the discovery of ever-increasing quantities of remains.

Among these are parts of saber-toothed tiger (Megantereon cultridens), Carnutes elk (Cervalces carnutorum), Megaloceros (Megaloceros obscurus), euladocerus (Euladocerus ctenoides-discranios), beavers, dormouse (Dryomys nitedula), red deer (Cervus affinis), Emys europaea, ancient hippopotamus (Hippopotamus antiquus), Rhinoceros leptorhinus, ancient elephant (Palaeoloxodon antiquus), Etruscan ox (Leptobos etruscus), woolly mammoth (Mammuthus primigenius), but above all the southern elephant (Elephas meridionalis) and the Etruscan rhinoceros (Stephanorhinus etruscus), of which fragments of about twenty specimens have been found, now preserved at the Milan Natural History Museum (some of which were destroyed during the bombings of World War II) and the Museo Civico Scienze Naturali Enrico Caffi.

Furthermore, core samples taken in 1991 in an area between the old Martinelli Furnace and Ca' Moranda confirmed the presence of trees now extinct in Europe but still present in the Asian and American continents: notable are the Chinese and American cypress, hickory (Carya), Liquidambar, Caucasian wingnut (Pterocarya fraxinifolia), Tsuga charugii, and Atlas cedar.

Then, about one million years ago, the barrier located between the Agro di Casnigo and the locality Prato Colle (on the slopes of Monte Beio) gave way, completely emptying the basin. Subsequently, between 950,000 and 870,000 years ago, another basin, much smaller than the previous one and dubbed Lake Cà Manòt due to the eponymous locality where it was initially identified, formed in the area. This was created due to the raising of the Serio River's alluvial fan, swollen by the melting of glaciers that at that time reached as far as Ponte Nossa, once again obstructing the outlet of the basin.

However, due to the cold temperatures present during that glacial period, the new lake did not support life forms.

== Bibliography ==
- Ghirardelli, Aldo (1984). Leffe e le sue chiese [Leffe and Its Churches] (in Italian). Leffe.
- Ravazzi, Cesare (2003). Gli antichi bacini lacustri e i fossili di Leffe, Ranica e Pianico-Sèllere [The Ancient Lake Basins and Fossils of Leffe, Ranica, and Pianico-Sèllere] (in Italian). Bergamo: Quaderni della Comunità Montana Valle Seriana.
- "La storia dell'antico lago di Leffe" [The History of the Ancient Lake Leffe] (PDF) (in Italian). Archived from the original (PDF) on 4 March 2016.
- "Un'escursione ai depositi del bacino di Leffe e ai suoi fossili" [An Excursion to the Deposits of the Leffe Basin and Its Fossils] (PDF) (in Italian). Archived from the original (PDF) on 12 February 2015.
