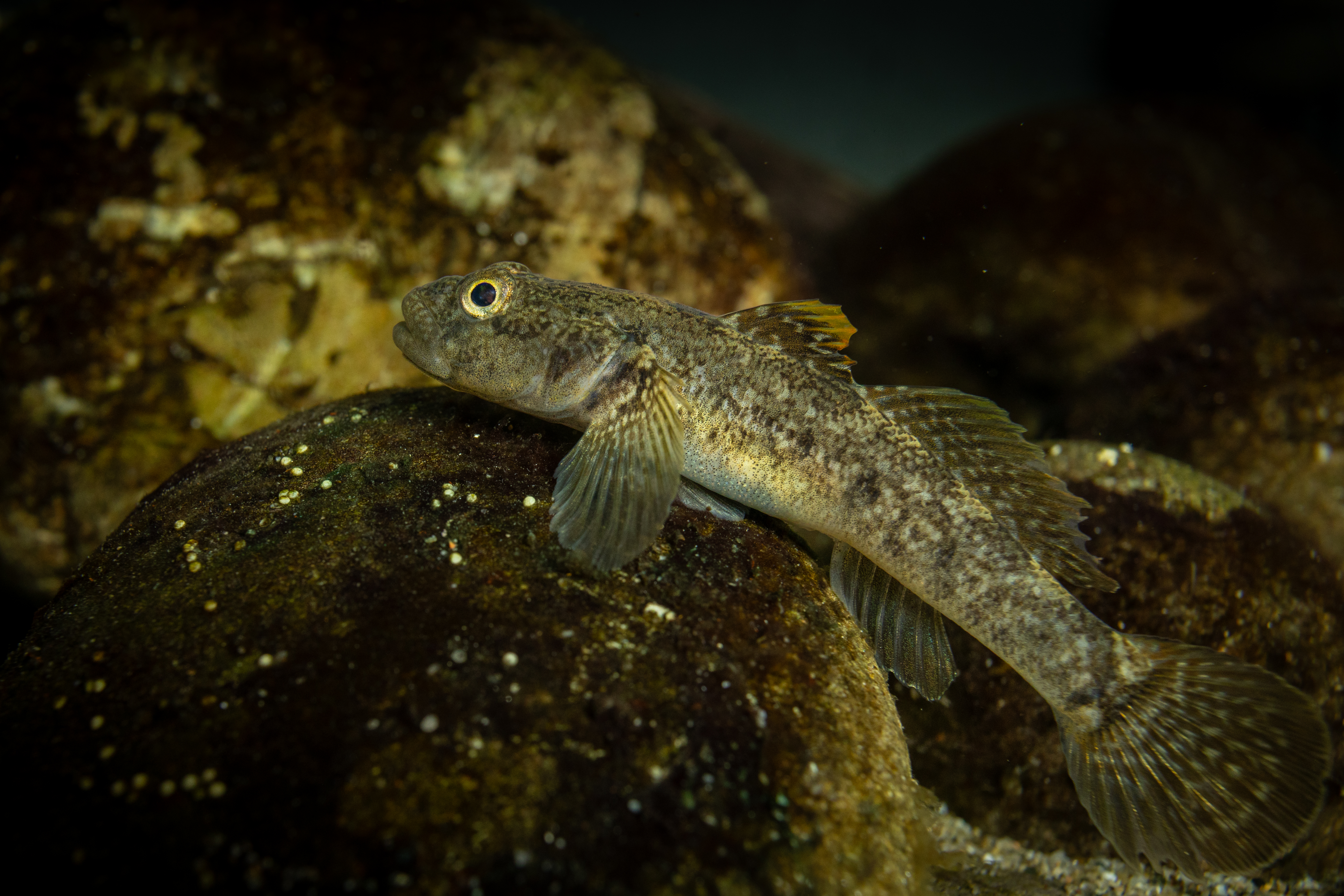

Conservation status
- Endangered (IUCN 3.1)

Scientific classification
- Kingdom: Animalia
- Phylum: Chordata
- Class: Actinopterygii
- Order: Gobiiformes
- Family: Gobiidae
- Genus: Padogobius
- Species: P. nigricans

Binomial name
- Padogobius nigricans (Canestrini, 1867)

Synonyms
- Gobius fluviatilis nigricans Canestrini, 1867; Gobius nigricans Canestrini, 1867; Gobius avernensis Canestrini, 1868

= Arno goby =

Species of fish

Padogobius nigricans, the Arno goby, is a species of goby endemic to Italy. It occurs in streams, staying to well-vegetated edge areas. Males of this species reach a length of 12.5 centimetres (4.9 in) TL while the females only reach 7 centimetres (2.8 in) TL.
