= Ranzanico =

- Comune
- Comune di Ranzanico
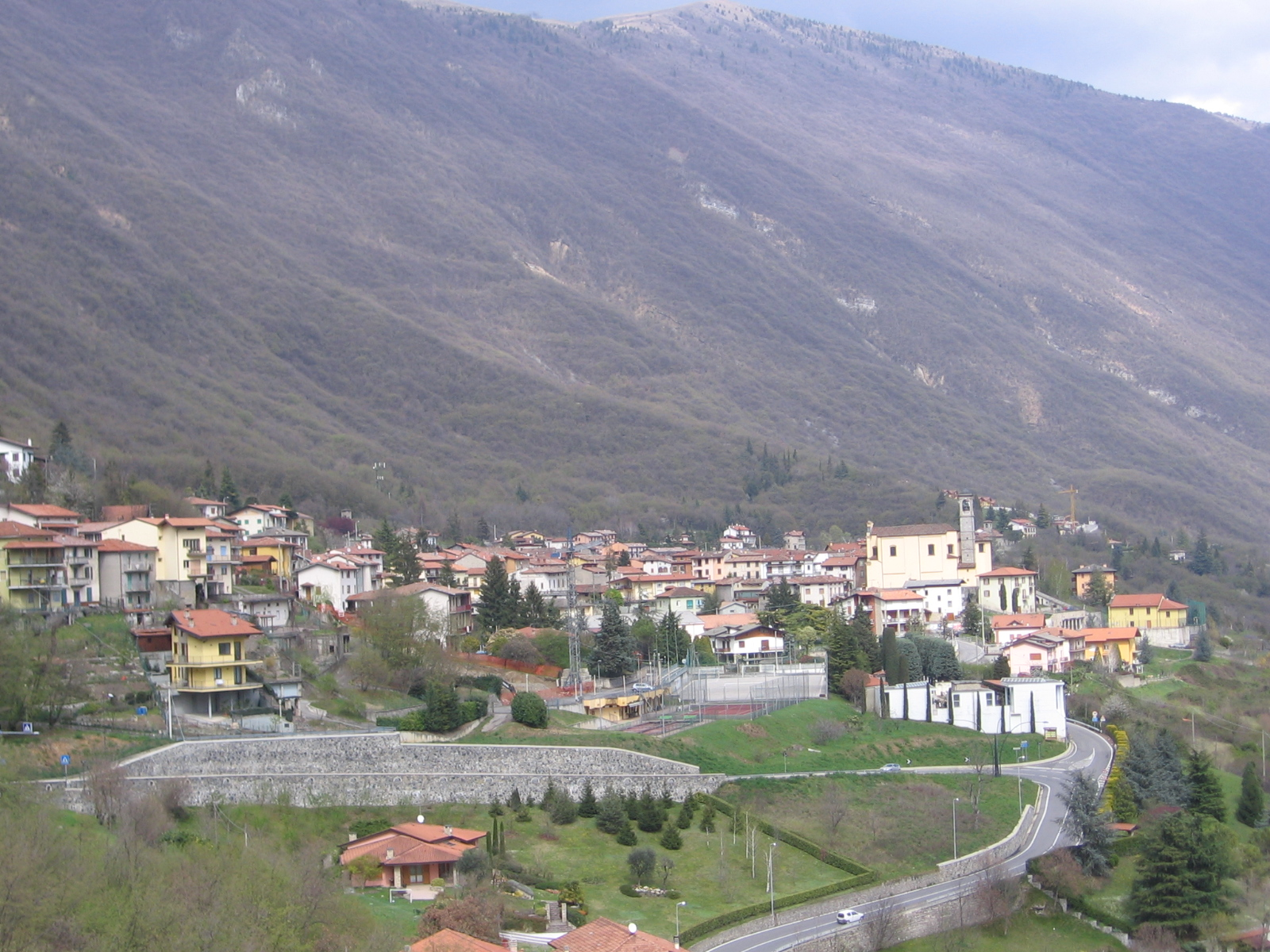
- Ranzanico

- Location within Italy Location within Lombardy
- Coordinates: 45°47′N 9°56′E
- Country: Italy
- Region: Lombardy
- Province: Bergamo (BG)

Government
  - Mayor: Renato Freri

Area
  - Total: 7.21 km^{2} (2.78 sq mi)
- Elevation: 519 m (1,703 ft)

Population (30 November 2016)
  - Total: 1,219
  - Density: 169/km^{2} (438/sq mi)
- Demonym: Ranzanicesi
- Time zone: UTC+1 (CET)
  - Summer (DST): UTC+2 (CEST)
- Postal code: 24060
- Dialing code: 035
- Website: Official website

Ranzanico (Bergamasque: Ransaních) is a comune (municipality) in the Province of Bergamo in the Italian region of Lombardy, located about 70 kilometres (43 mi) northeast of Milan and about 25 kilometres (16 mi) northeast of Bergamo.

Ranzanico borders the following municipalities: Bianzano, Endine Gaiano, Gandino, Monasterolo del Castello, Peia, Spinone al Lago.
