= Francesco Follo =

Italian priest

Francesco Follo (born 22 October 1946) is an Italian priest of the Catholic Church who has worked in the diplomatic service of the Holy See as its Permanent Observer to UNESCO from 2002 to 2021. He spent the previous twenty years in the offices of the Vatican Secretariat of State and before that worked as a journalist and performed pastoral work.

== Biography ==
Francesco Follo was born on 22 October 1946 in Pandino, in the Cremona Province. He was ordained a priest of the Diocese of Cremona on 28 June 1970.

He was vicar of San Marco Evangelista in Casirate d'Adda from 1970 to 1976. He obtained a master's degree in theology from the Theological Faculty of Northern Italy in 1976, a Master's degree in philosophy at the Aloisianum of Gallarate in 1979 and a doctorate in philosophy at the Pontifical Gregorian University in 1984.

From 1976 to 1984, he worked as a reporter for the magazine Letture published by the San Fedele Center of the Society of Jesus in Milan. He was also from 1976 to 1983 a spiritual advisor to students of the Polytechnic Institute, the Academy of Fine Arts Brera and the Conservatory of Music "Giuseppe Verdi" in Milan. He became a member of the Order of Journalists in 1978. In 1982 he held the post of deputy director of the weekly La Vita Cattolica. From 1978 to 1983, he was Professor of Cultural Anthropology and Philosophy at the Catholic University of Milan and at the Higher Institute of Education Assistants in Milan.

He joined the staff of the Section for General Affairs of the Secretariat of State of the Holy See on 17 September 1983. From 1988 to 1989, he also taught history of Greek philosophy at the Pontifical Athenaeum Regina Apostolorum in Rome. On 27 May 2000, Pope John Paul II awarded him the title Prelate of Honor of His Holiness.

On 11 May 2002, he was appointed Permanent Observer of the Holy See to UNESCO, based in Paris. He was replaced in that position by Eric Soviguidi on 11 November 2021.

Since 2004, he has also been a member of the Scientific Committee of Oasis, a magazine specializing in intercultural and inter-religious dialogue.
