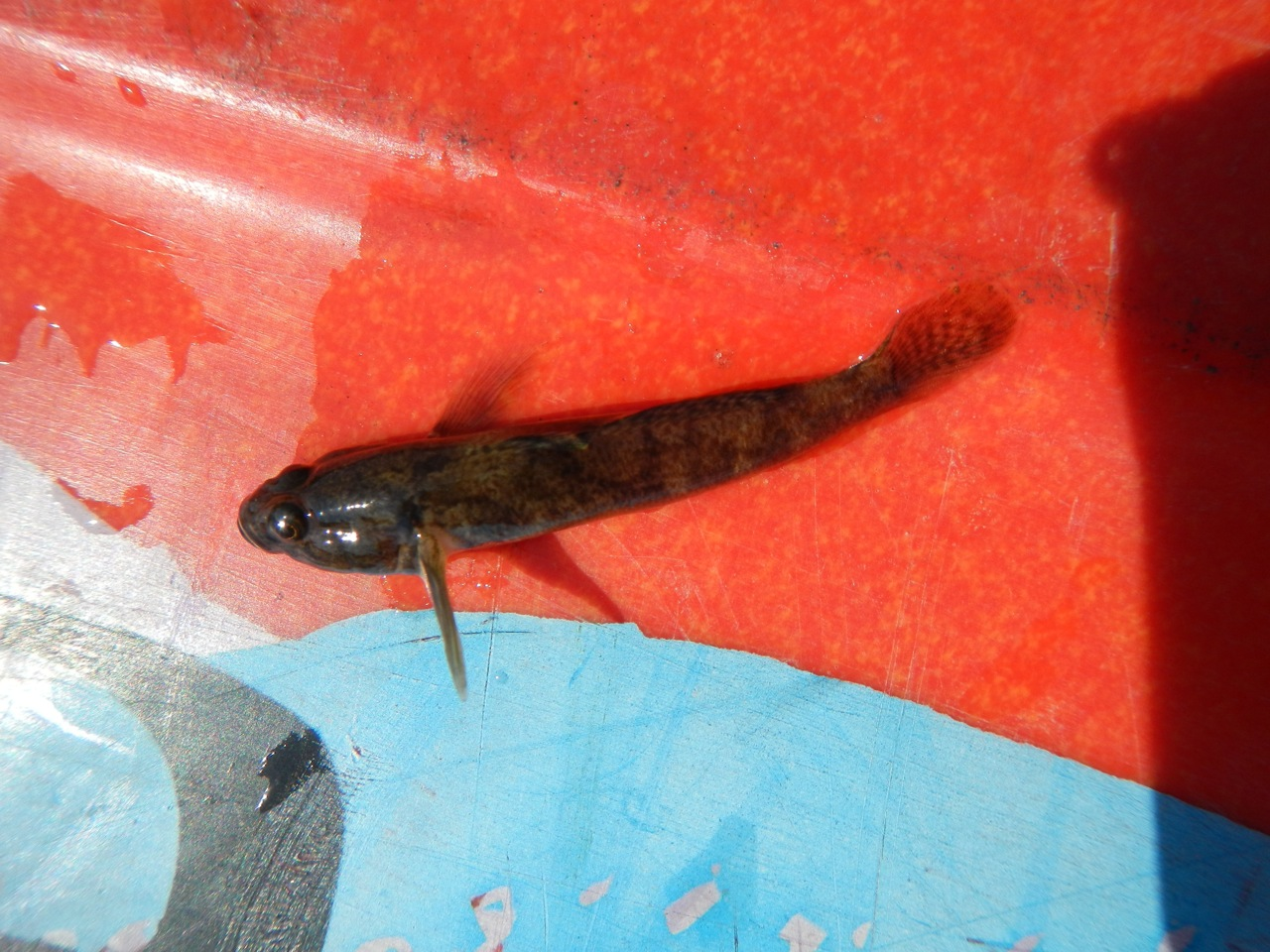
- Padogobius bonelli

Scientific classification
- Kingdom: Animalia
- Phylum: Chordata
- Class: Actinopterygii
- Order: Gobiiformes
- Family: Gobiidae
- Genus: Padogobius; L. S. Berg, 1932

Type species
- Gobius martensii Günther, 1861

Synonyms
- Fluvicola Iljin, 1930

= Padogobius =

Genus of fishes

Padogobius is a genus of fish in the family Gobiidae, the gobies. They are native to fresh waters of southern Europe.

== Species ==
There are currently two recognized species in this genus:

- Padogobius bonelli (Bonaparte, 1846) (Padanian goby)
- Padogobius nigricans (Canestrini, 1867) (Arno goby)

== Mating system ==
=== Male - male competition ===
As with many other Gobiidae species, Padogobius males establish small territories around their nesting sites in freshwater streams and rivers of Northern Italy. In P. martensi, both male and female are highly aggressive in defending a hollow beneath a stone. During the breeding season between May and July, these males become exceptionally competitive as they try to acquire larger stones which will have a larger egg-laying surface. Due to the fact that this will influence their breeding success, there is competition between males for this resource that is in limited supply and in high demand. Only larger and more aggressive males will be capable of securing such a valuable resource, which aids in establishing dominance. This intersexual male competition for resources causes male body size to be positively correlated with the quality of the resources in which they defend. This means that larger males are sexually selected for larger body size, as it allows them to be superior at obtaining larger nesting sites and access to females. Their body size also relates to how far apart territories will be from one another, establishing territory size and distribution. Overall it can be said that P. martensi males which are larger and display higher aggression will have a higher Resource Holding Potential, or in other words are most likely to win a competition.

=== Courtship ===
In this genus we see a mating system that consists not only of male contests but also of direct female choice as well. There is also sexual dimorphism seen during the breeding season. In P. martensi, the females retain their brownish pale colour to remain cryptic, whereas the courting males will have blue fins, a blue strip on the dorsal fin and a dark body. Sexually selected dimorphic traits also extends to distinctions in behaviour traits. Once the male is mature at one year old, it can begin to perform courting displays, although only those above 50 mm in length show any reproductive success. Within the P. martensi species, high ranking males, who have established their dominance by using their size to win male – male contests, may monopolize a mating region and can be seen to start courting earlier on. But the activity of courtship comes at a cost as it makes the males more noticeable to predators. Males with lower ranks are rarely seen courting to conserve energy and reduce social costs. Females assess dominance and correlated body size through courtship displays and provides information about parental care abilities of the male. Minor differences between male behaviours may also provide information related to their ability to perform parental care and influence the females choice. It is also important to note that courting performance doesn't get better with size.

Courting begins with chemical communication from the female as she emits a sex pheromone through her urine, a prostaglandin derivative, which evokes male courtship in P. martensi. While females remain less active, seen resting on benthic sediment, males will begin performing visual displays and producing sounds. The visual courtship displays are called Approaching – Leading (AL) activities and are the main signal to attract females toward the males nest. This pattern involves moving toward the female (approaching), followed by moving backwards toward the shelter (leading). Females reply by moving towards the shelter in a submissive posture.

The second aspect of courtship displays are the vocalizations made by the males. P. martensi males produce courting calls ranging in frequency from 100 to 200 Hertz, as soon a prospective mate is within sight, and is done in conjunction with physical displays. There are three different types of breeding vocalizations, the most common being a complex two-part call consisting of drumming and complex rapidly repeating pulses. Outside of the nest, these are produced at a low rate, but as the male enters the nest, the vocal activity rises. This is due to the fact the male and his nest are then concealed and the increased calls can help direct the female to the nest. These sounds are rarely made just before fertilization suggesting that the sounds may not function to sync spawning behaviour but are purely for courtship and leading purposes. In P. nigricans, these vocalizations can continue several minutes after the female has left the site. There has been no documented evidence to show that sensory bias exploitation is part of the motive behind these vocalizations.

=== Egg laying and parental care ===
Most research regarding egg laying in the genus Padogobius relates to P. martensi. Egg laying begins once the male has cleaned the underside of the rock of his nest. Once the female has navigated her way into the nest, she assumes a spawning position, in which her belly turns to the ceiling of the hollow. The female then lays on average 170 to 410 elongate shaped eggs per nest. While she is laying her eggs, the male periodically turns upside down to fertilize the eggs. This process takes approximately one hour, after which the female leaves the nest and she will be able to produce another clutch of eggs roughly 30 days later. In these polygynous fish, males will except eggs from many females, as observed with 2 to 3 sets of eggs at multiple stages of development in one nest. Larger males can reproduce more times and are able to obtain more females over the entire mating season. The male's reproductive success is therefore measured by how many individual clutches he has under his care in his nest.

Immediately after the eggs have been laid and fertilized, it then becomes the role of the male to tend to well-being of the eggs. The females do not take part in parental care activities. This male parental care involves two aspects. The first is defending his nest and eggs against intruders. This is necessary to ensure his reproductive success as nest take over by other males does occasionally take place. When this happens, the existing eggs are cannibalized and the nest owner is evicted from his hollow. The second aspect of parental care involves fanning the eggs vigorously to ensure water circulation around the eggs. This involves the male doing wide sweeps of his pectoral fins as well as doing full body oscillations. This ensures the eggs are kept clean and with an adequate supply of oxygen via gas exchange. Environmental variables impact how intense the fanning activities are. For instance, higher temperatures or lower oxygen levels will increase fanning activities. The male also uses his mouth and body to keep physical contact with the eggs, which helps keep them clean, but this activity tends to decrease in frequency over time, whereas fanning remains consist the entire time. These fanning activities continue for 1 to 2 weeks and parental care ends once the eggs have hatched.
