= Pizzo Formico =

Mountain in Italy

Coordinates: 45°50′51″N 9°55′26″E

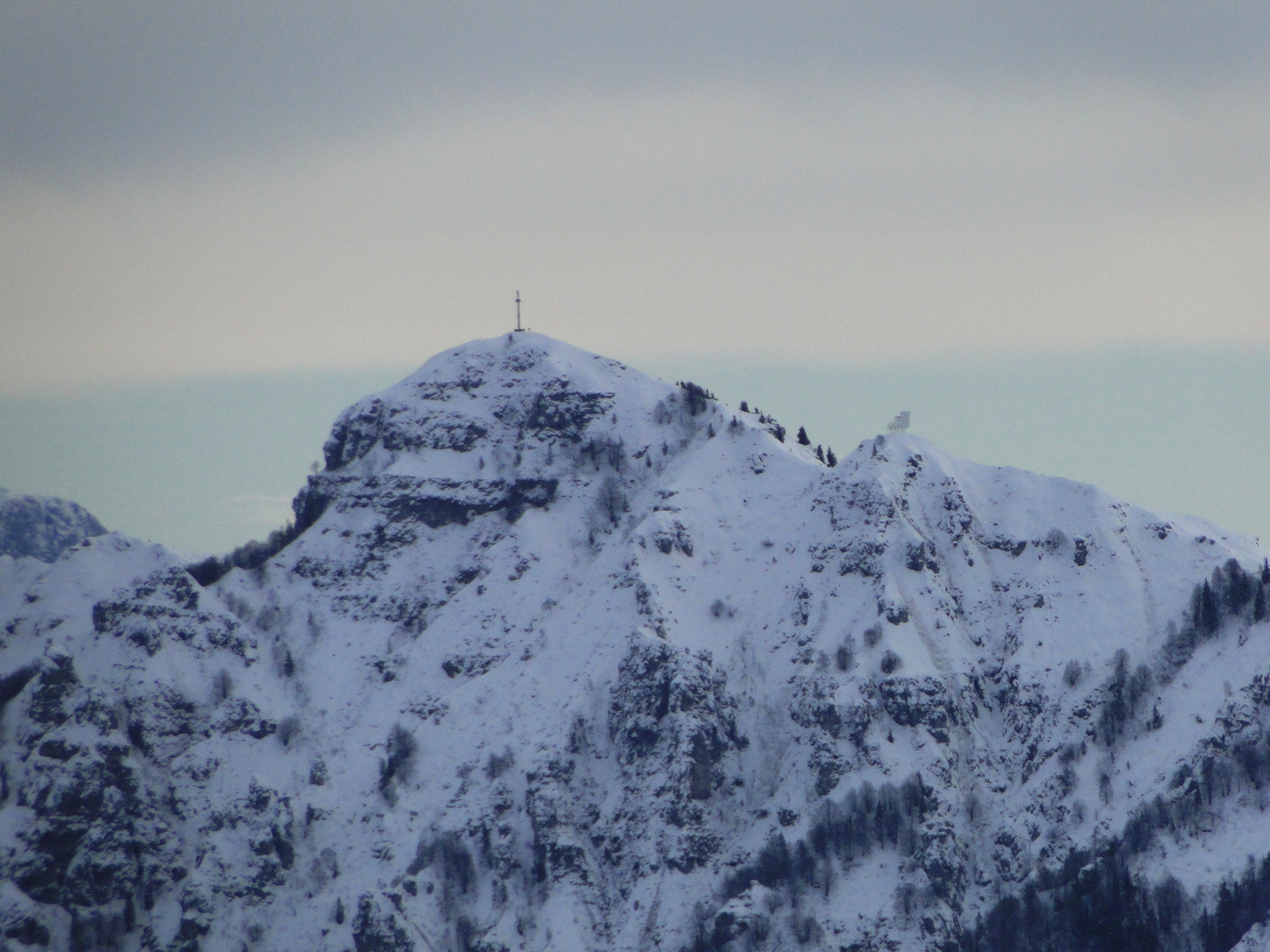
- Pizzo Formico seen from Mount Grem

Highest point
- Elevation: 1,636 m (5,367 ft)

Geography
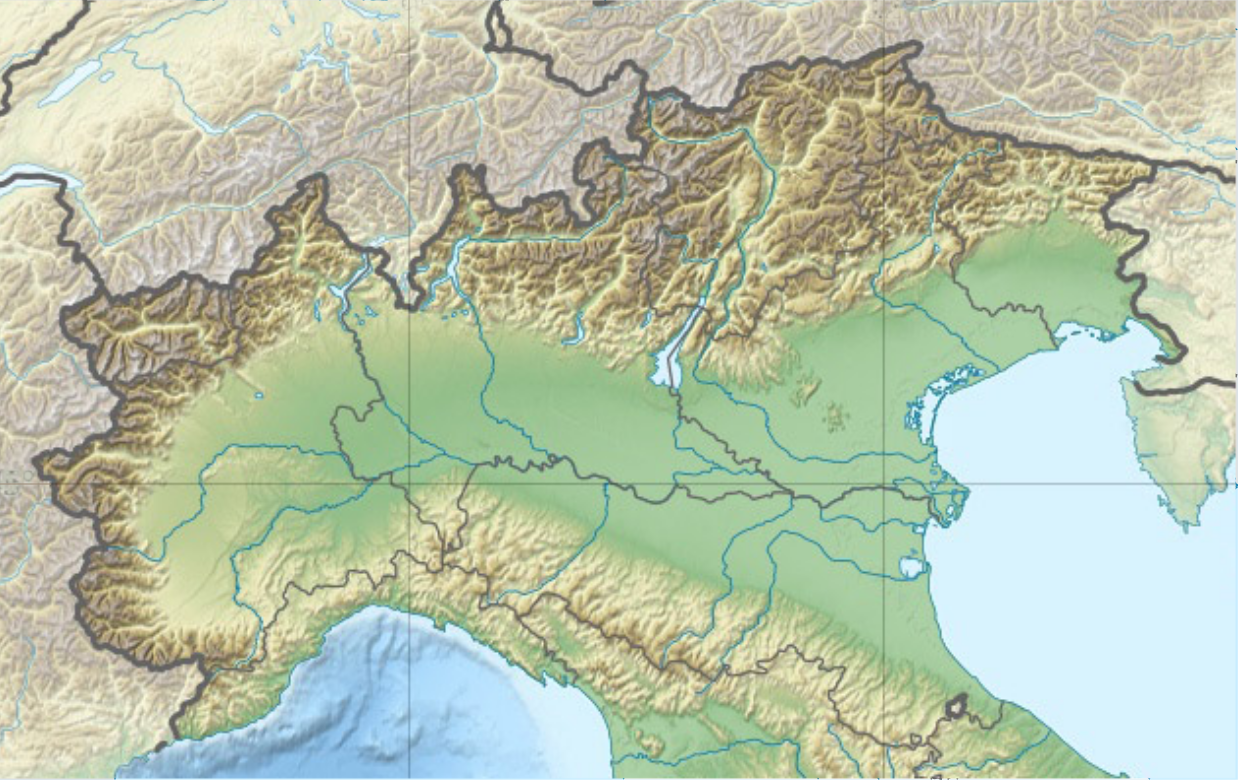
- Location within Northern Italy
- Location: Lombardy, Italy
- Parent range: Bergamasque Prealps

Pizzo Formico is a mountain located within the Bergamasque Prealps in Lombardy, Italy.
