= Guiscardo Suardi =

Most Reverend Guiscardo Suardi
- Bishop of Bergamo
- Church: Catholic Church
- Diocese: Diocese of Bergamo
- In office: 1272–1282

Personal details
- Died: 22 February 1282 Bergamo, Italy

Guiscardo Suardi (died 22 Feb 1282) was a Roman Catholic prelate who served as Bishop of Bergamo (1272–1282).

== Biography ==
On 8 Jul 1272, Guiscardo Suardi, member of the Suardi family, was appointed during the papacy of Pope Gregory X as Bishop of Bergamo. He served as Bishop of Bergamo, until his death on 22 Feb 1282.

While bishop, he was the principal consecrator of Berardo Maggi, Bishop of Brescia (1275).

== External links and additional sources ==
- Cheney, David M. "Diocese of Bergamo". Catholic-Hierarchy.org. (for Chronology of Bishops)
- Chow, Gabriel. "Diocese of Bergamo (Italy)". GCatholic.org. (for Chronology of Bishops)

Catholic Church titles
Preceded by Erbordo O.P	Bishop of Bergamo; 1272–1282	Succeeded by Roberto Benghi
