= Endine Gaiano =

- Comune
- Comune di Endine Gaiano
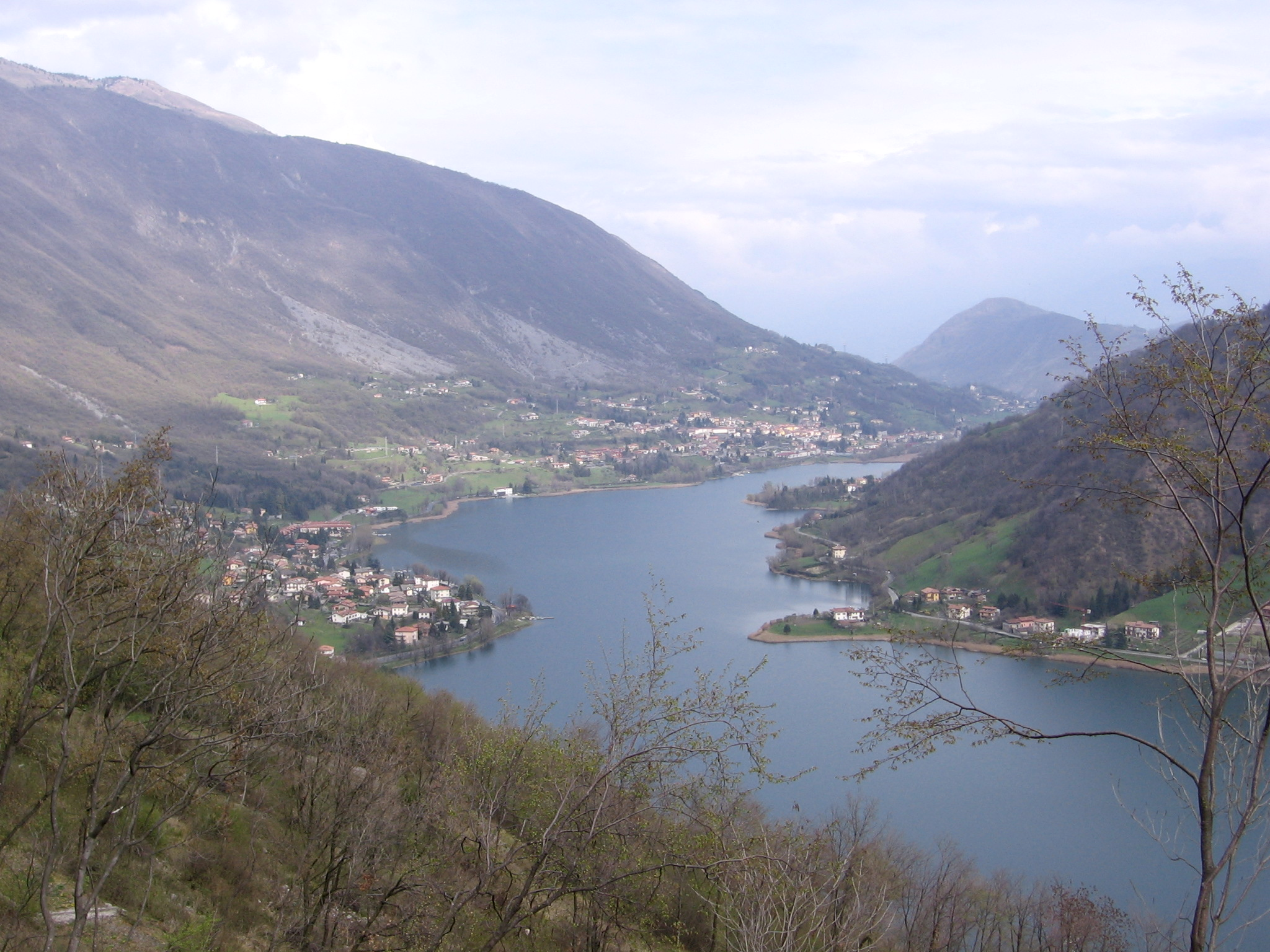
- Endine Gaiano and the Endine Lake

- Location within Italy Location within Lombardy
- Coordinates: 45°47′N 9°58′E
- Country: Italy
- Region: Lombardy
- Province: Bergamo (BG)

Government
  - Mayor: Marco Zoppetti

Area
  - Total: 21.07 km^{2} (8.14 sq mi)
- Elevation: 400 m (1,300 ft)

Population (30 April 2017)
  - Total: 3,472
  - Density: 164.8/km^{2} (426.8/sq mi)
- Demonym: Endinesi
- Time zone: UTC+1 (CET)
  - Summer (DST): UTC+2 (CEST)
- Postal code: 24060
- Dialing code: 035
- Website: Official website

Endine Gaiano (Bergamasque: Ènden Gaià) is a comune (municipality) in the Province of Bergamo in the Italian region of Lombardy, located about 70 kilometres (43 mi) northeast of Milan and about 25 kilometres (16 mi) northeast of Bergamo.

Endine Gaiano borders the following municipalities: Fonteno, Gandino, Monasterolo del Castello, Ranzanico, Solto Collina, Sovere.
