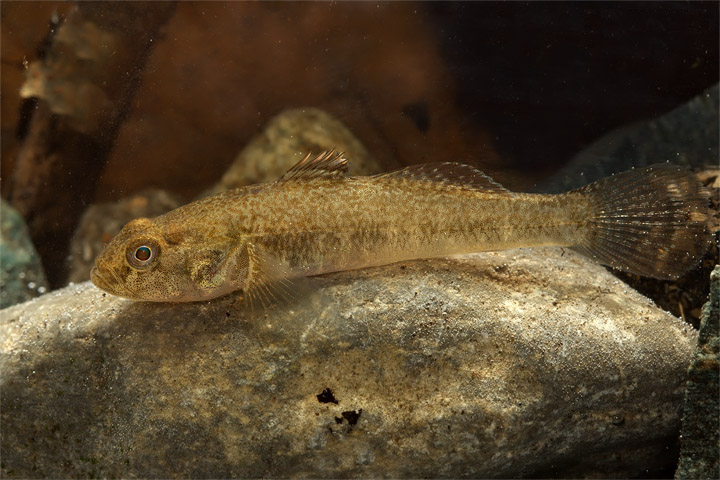

Conservation status
- Least Concern (IUCN 3.1)

Scientific classification
- Kingdom: Animalia
- Phylum: Chordata
- Class: Actinopterygii
- Order: Gobiiformes
- Family: Gobiidae
- Genus: Padogobius
- Species: P. bonelli

Binomial name
- Padogobius bonelli (Bonaparte 1846)
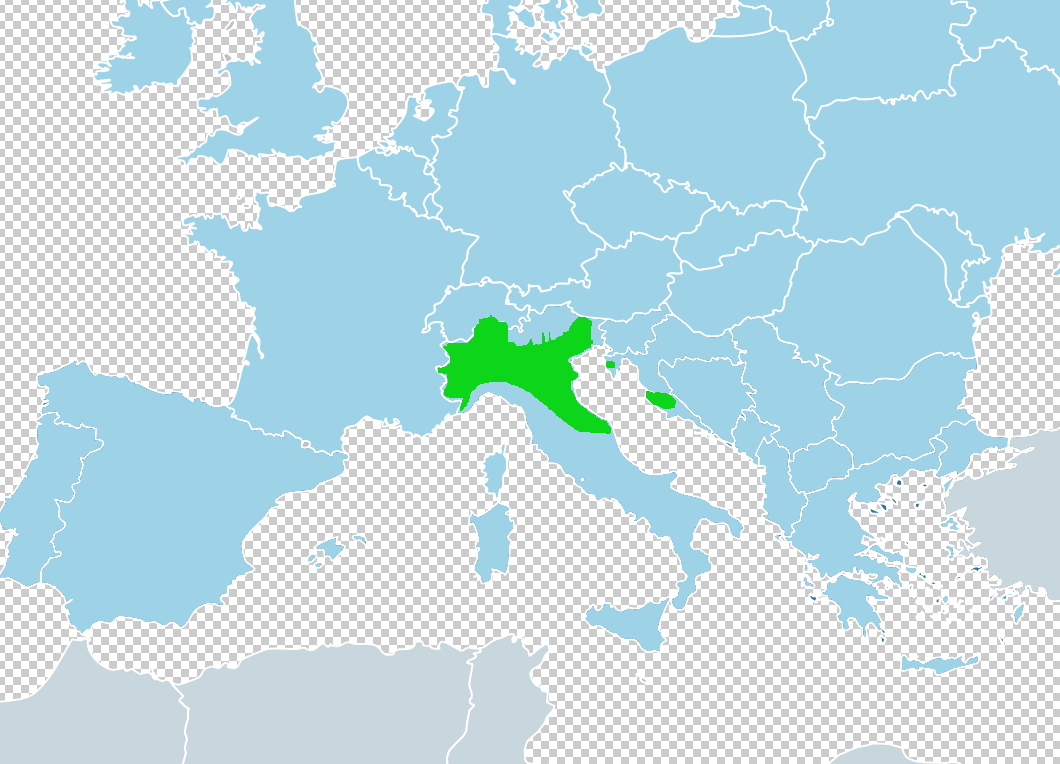

Synonyms
- Padogobius panizzae Berg, 1931 (ambiguous name); Gobius bonelli Bonaparte, 1846; Gobius fluviatilis Nardo, 1824; Gobius fluviatilis Valenciennes, 1837; Gobius martensii Günther, 1861; Padogobius martensii (Günther, 1861)

= Padogobius bonelli =

Species of fish

Padogobius bonelli, the Padanian goby, is a species of true goby from the family Gobiidae native to rivers of Croatia, Italy, Slovenia, and Switzerland, where it is usually found in areas with gravel substrates or along the edges of dense vegetation. Males of this species can reach a length of 8.6 centimetres (3.4 in) TL while females only reach 7.5 centimetres (3.0 in) TL. This species' specific name honours the Italian naturalist Franco Andrea Bonelli (1784–1830), who had originally described it as Gobius fluviatilis without realizing that this name was already being used for a different goby species, the monkey goby, which had been described by Pallas in 1814.
