= Monasterolo del Castello =

- Comune
- Comune di Monasterolo del Castello
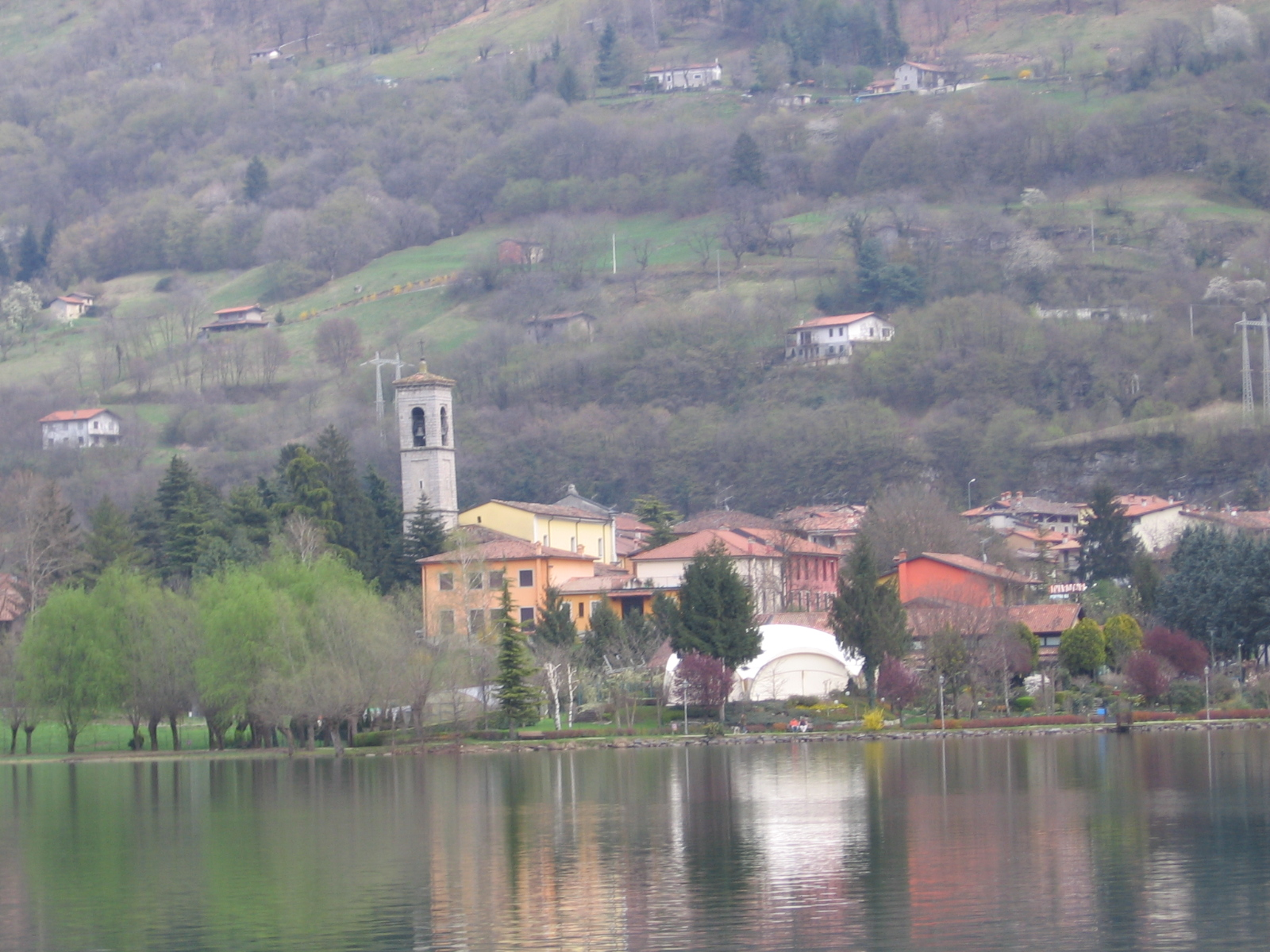
- Monasterolo del Castello

- Location within Italy Location within Lombardy
- Coordinates: 45°46′N 9°56′E
- Country: Italy
- Region: Lombardy
- Province: Bergamo (BG)

Government
  - Mayor: Gabriele Zappella

Area
  - Total: 8.75 km^{2} (3.38 sq mi)
- Elevation: 365 m (1,198 ft)

Population (30 April 2017)
  - Total: 1,165
  - Density: 133/km^{2} (345/sq mi)
- Demonym: Monasterolesi
- Time zone: UTC+1 (CET)
  - Summer (DST): UTC+2 (CEST)
- Postal code: 24060
- Dialing code: 035
- Website: Official website

Monasterolo del Castello (Bergamasque: Monastaröl) is a comune (municipality) in the Province of Bergamo in the Italian region of Lombardy, located about 70 kilometres (43 mi) northeast of Milan and about 20 kilometres (12 mi) northeast of Bergamo.

Monasterolo del Castello borders the following municipalities: Adrara San Martino, Adrara San Rocco, Casazza, Endine Gaiano, Fonteno, Grone, Ranzanico, Spinone al Lago.
