= Leffe, Lombardy =

Leffe
- Comune
- Comune di Leffe
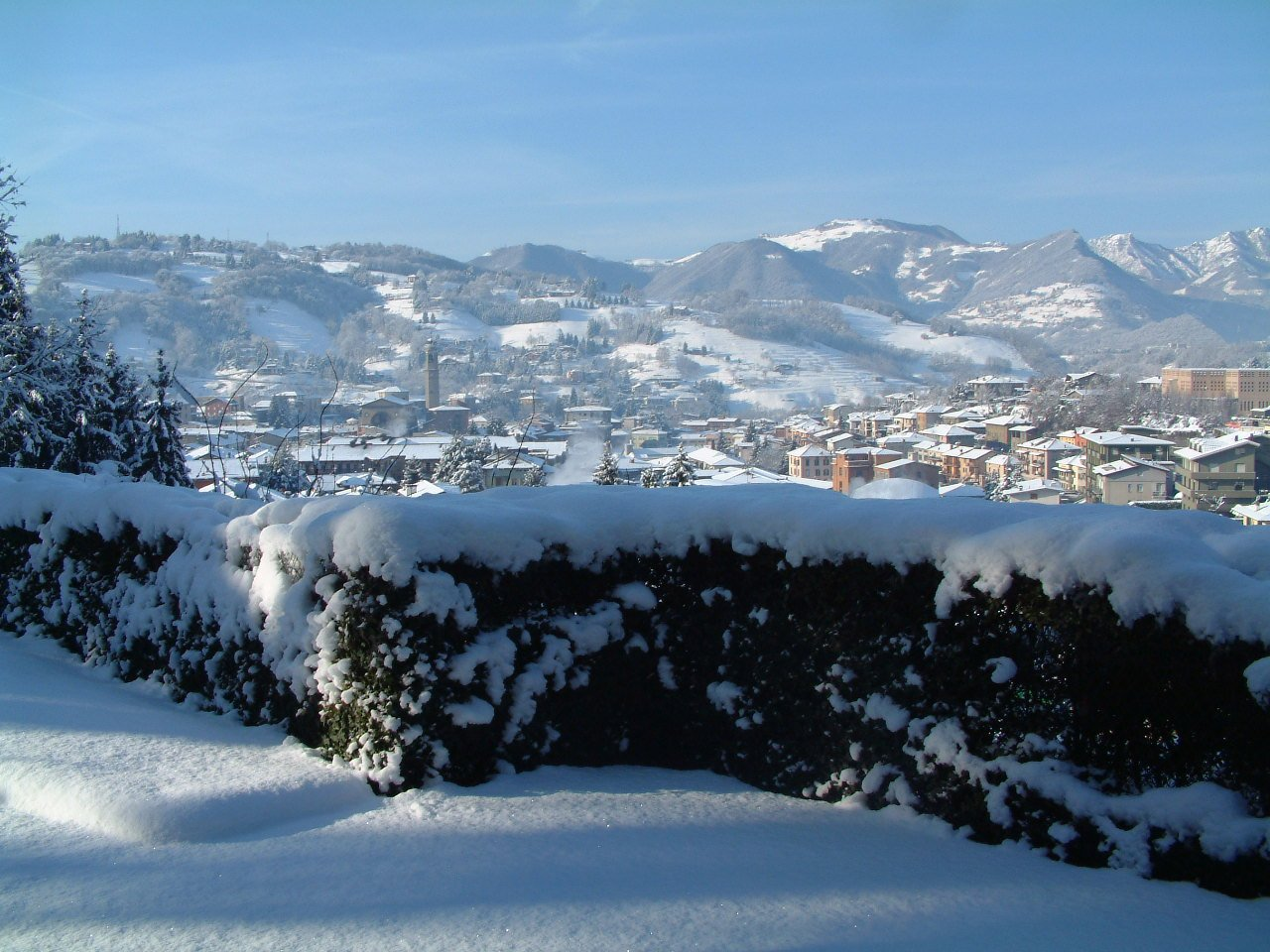
- Leffe

- Coat of arms

- Location within Italy Location within Lombardy
- Coordinates: 45°48′N 09°54′E
- Country: Italy
- Region: Lombardy
- Province: Bergamo (BG)
- Frazioni: San Rocco

Government
  - Mayor: Marco Gallizioli

Area
  - Total: 6.69 km^{2} (2.58 sq mi)
- Elevation: 453 m (1,486 ft)

Population (31 August 2017)
  - Total: 4,463
  - Density: 667/km^{2} (1,730/sq mi)
- Demonym: Leffesi
- Time zone: UTC+1 (CET)
  - Summer (DST): UTC+2 (CEST)
- Postal code: 24026
- Dialing code: 035
- Patron saint: Saint Michael
- Saint day: 29 September
- Website: Official website

Leffe (Bergamasque: Léf) is a town and comune near the Alps in Lombardy, Italy. It is located in the Val Gandino, nearly 80 kilometres (50 mi) from Milan, and administratively part of the province of Bergamo. The town is a center of textile industry.

== History ==
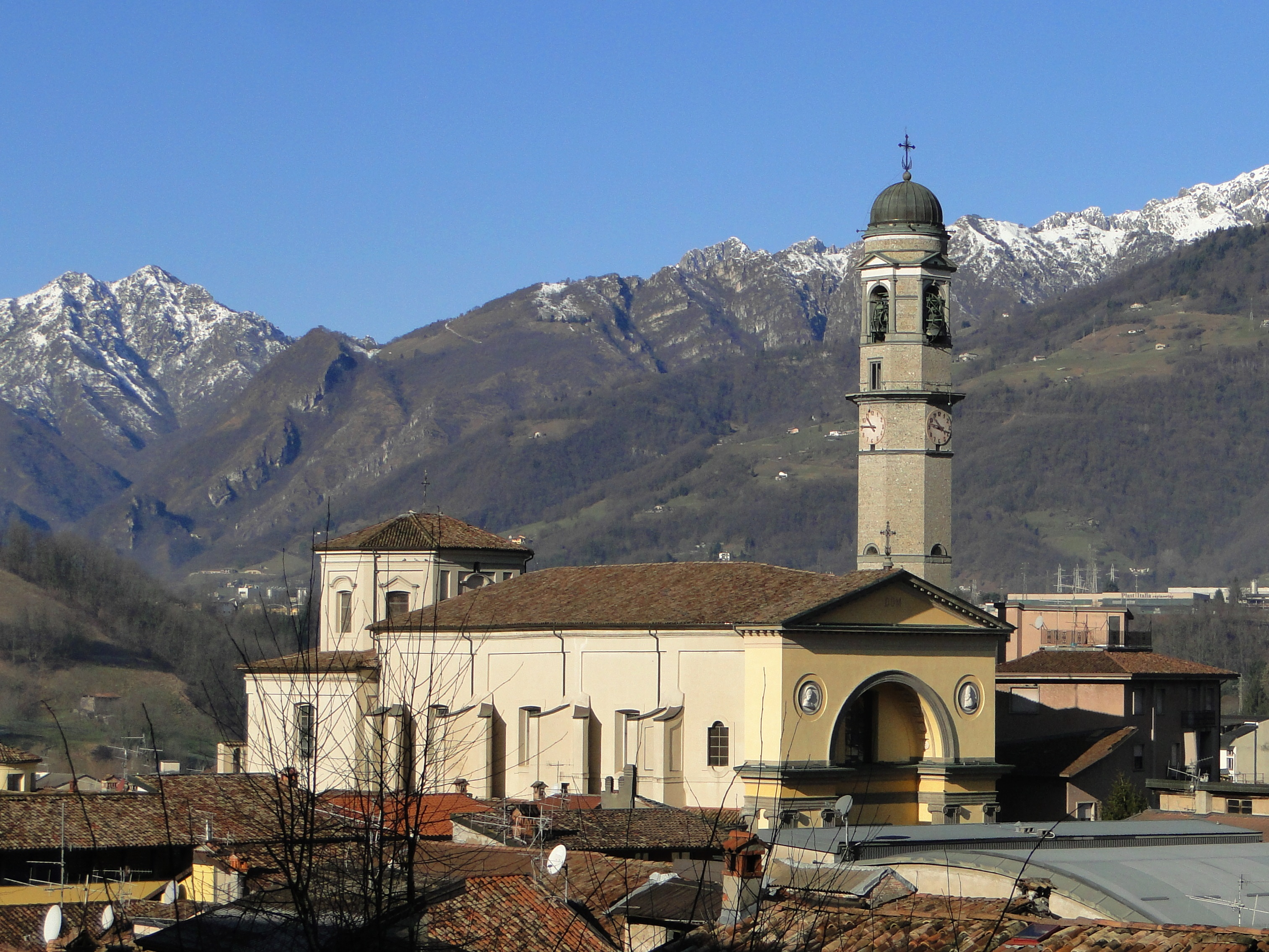
Parish church.

Fossils have been founded during the 20th century in the lignite mines, now preserved at the Museums of Natural Science in Milan and Bergamo. It is mentioned for the first time in a document of 903 with the name of Leufo.

== Main sights ==
- Palazzo Comunale. It has a portico and open gallery, together with an internal courtyard and well.
- The Parish House. It has an open gallery and music room, frescoed by Evaristo Baschenis, a painter from Bergamo of the 17th century.
- The Parish Church of San Michele (16th century), conserving a wooden sculptural group by Andrea Fantoni, dating from 1694, called la Madonnina.
- Lake Leffe
