= Suardi (dynasty) =

Coat of arms of Suardi family

The Suardi were a Ghibelline-allied noble family in medieval Bergamo. Their Guelph opponents were the Colleoni.

== History ==
In the 14th-century, the family was allied with the Visconti of Milan; Giovanni Suardi even married one of the daughters of Lord Bernabò. Guiscardo Suardi was a 13th-century bishop.

Suardi Castle still stands in Bianzano on a hilltop above the Cavallina and Seriana valleys. Suardi Tower is located in Trescore Balneario. The Suardi Chapel at Trescore Balneario is decorated with 16th-century frescoes by Lorenzo Lotto.

== See also ==
- Other people named Suardi
- Suarines, a Germanic tribe
