= Bianzano =

- Comune
- Comune di Bianzano
- Coat of arms

- Location of Bianzano in Italy Bianzano (Lombardy)
- Coordinates: 45°46′N 9°55′E
- Country: Italy
- Region: Lombardy
- Province: Province of Bergamo (BG)

Area
  - Total: 6 km^{2} (2.3 sq mi)
- Elevation: 614 m (2,014 ft)

Population (2007)
  - Total: 543
  - Density: 90/km^{2} (230/sq mi)
- Demonym: Bianzanesi
- Time zone: UTC+1 (CET)
  - Summer (DST): UTC+2 (CEST)
- Postal code: 24060
- Dialing code: 035
- Patron saint: San Rocco
- Saint day: 16 August
- Website: Official website

Bianzano (Bergamasque: Biansà) is a comune in the province of Bergamo, in Lombardy, Italy. It is 600 meters (2,000 ft) above sea level and lies on a little plateau between Cavallina and Seriana valleys. The village boasts a historic center, having kept its original structure with some remains of minor fortified buildings and the imposing medieval Suardi Castle overlooking the valley. Other two outstanding monuments are the shrine of Our Lady of the Assumption (1234) and the parish church dedicated to Saint Roch (1575).

== Suardi Castle ==
The date of the castle construction remains unknown, although an inscription on the right side of the portal which leads to the inner courtyard bears the date 1233. Surrounded by a double walls with the remains of the rampart, the castle has a perfectly square shape and is dominated by its 25-meter-high (82 ft) tower, centered on the front side of the building. The castle was never used as a noble residence but served as a safe place to keep agricultural produce and shelter wayfarers. Thanks to its position, it was also used to control the road linking up Cavallina and Seriana valleys.

Valuable frescoes are still preserved in the castle main entrance: playful Cupids with garlands and flowers on the barrel vault; the cardinal Virtues on the niches by the sides of the Gothic portal.

== The Shrine of Our Lady of the Assumption ==
Built in 1234, it served as parish church until 1614, when a new, greater church was built in the center of the village. Heavily restored at the beginning of the 18th century, it houses a valuable wooden ciborium carved by Andrea Fantoni.

== Gallery ==
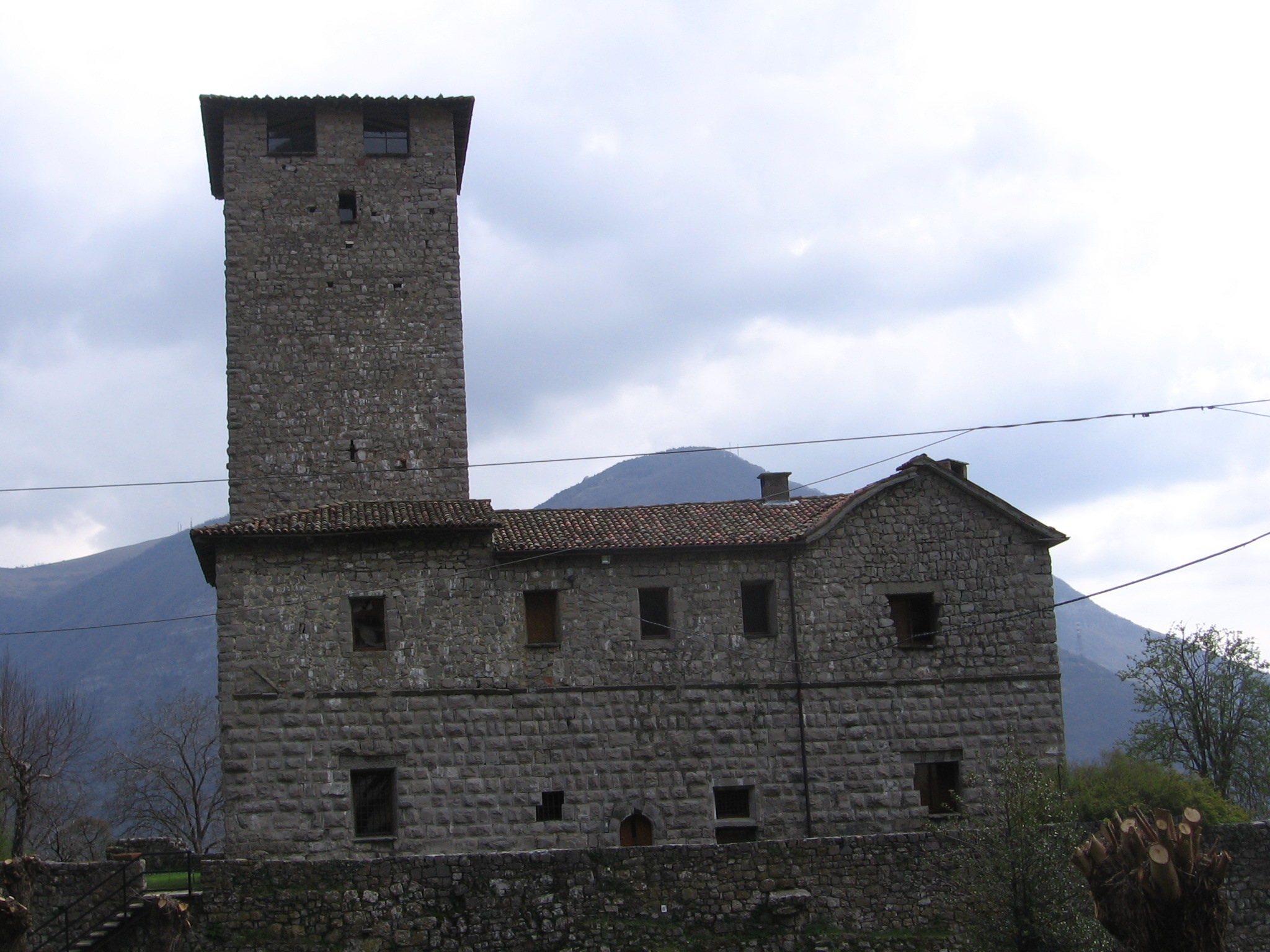
The Castle, view from the courtyard of the Parish Church

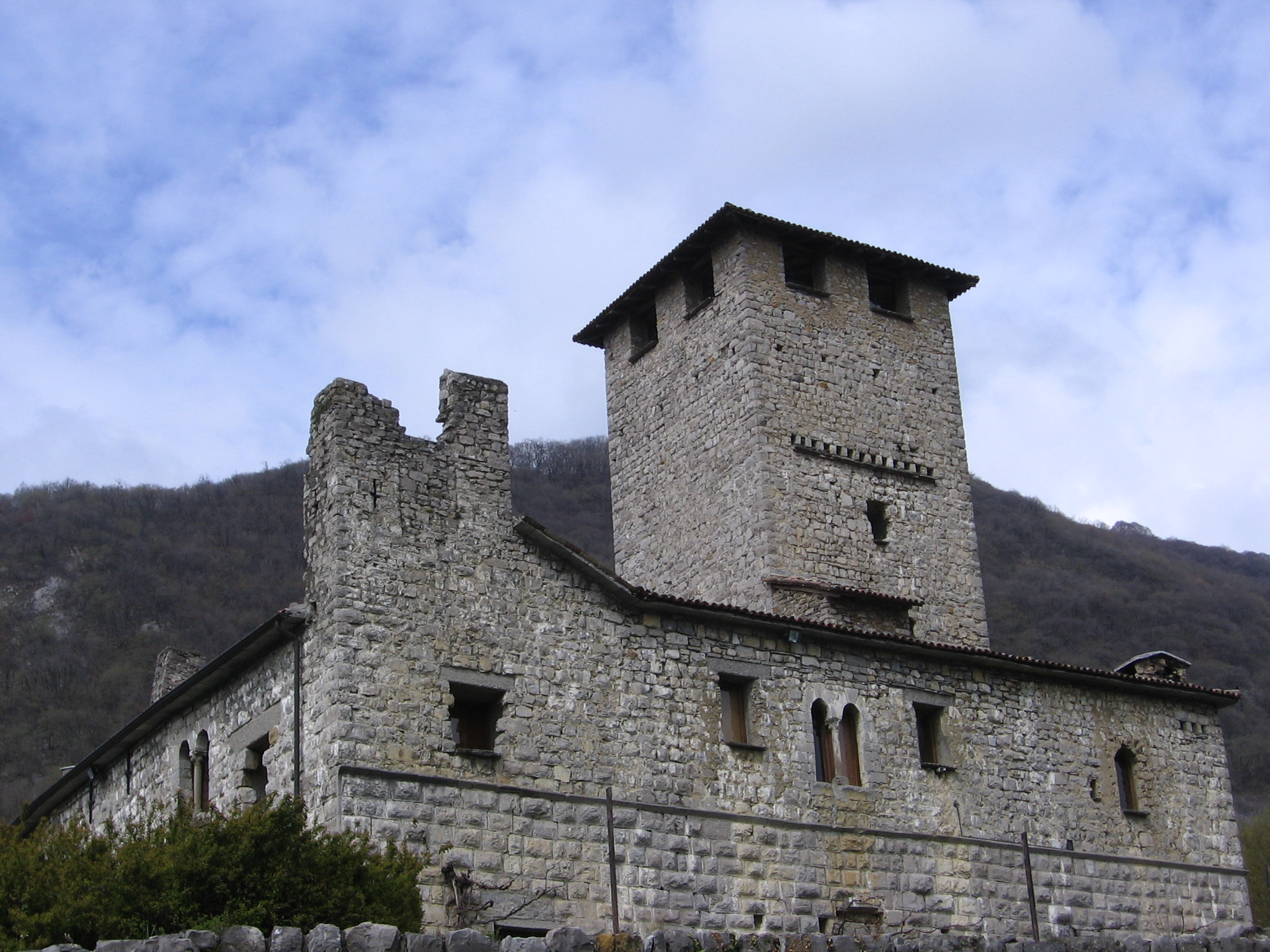
The Castle with remains of the battlement

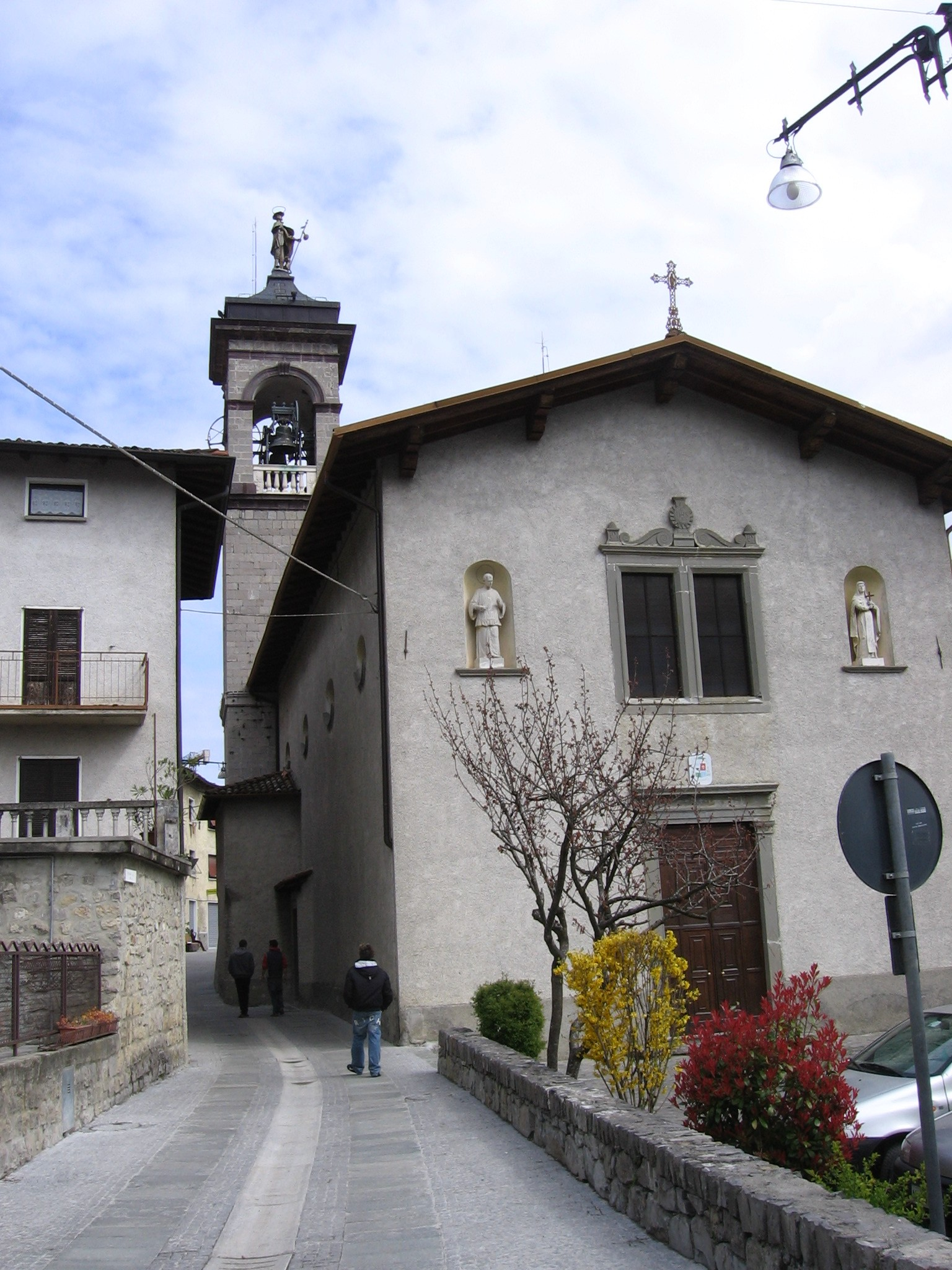
The parish church with its bell tower
