= Lucanians =

Ancient Italic population

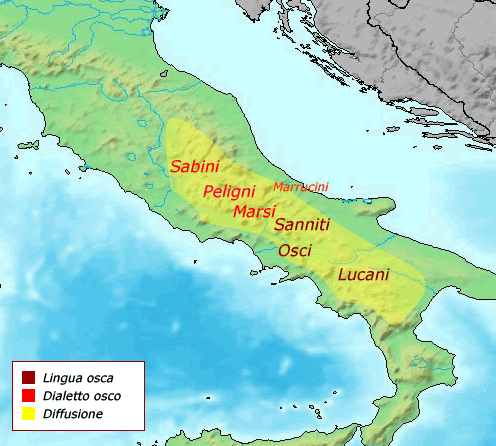
The Oscan language in the 5th century BC.

The Lucanians (Latin: Lucani) were an Italic tribe living in Lucania, in what is now southern Italy, who spoke the Oscan language, a member of the Italic languages. Today, the inhabitants of the Basilicata region are still called Lucani, and so is their dialect.

== Language and writing ==
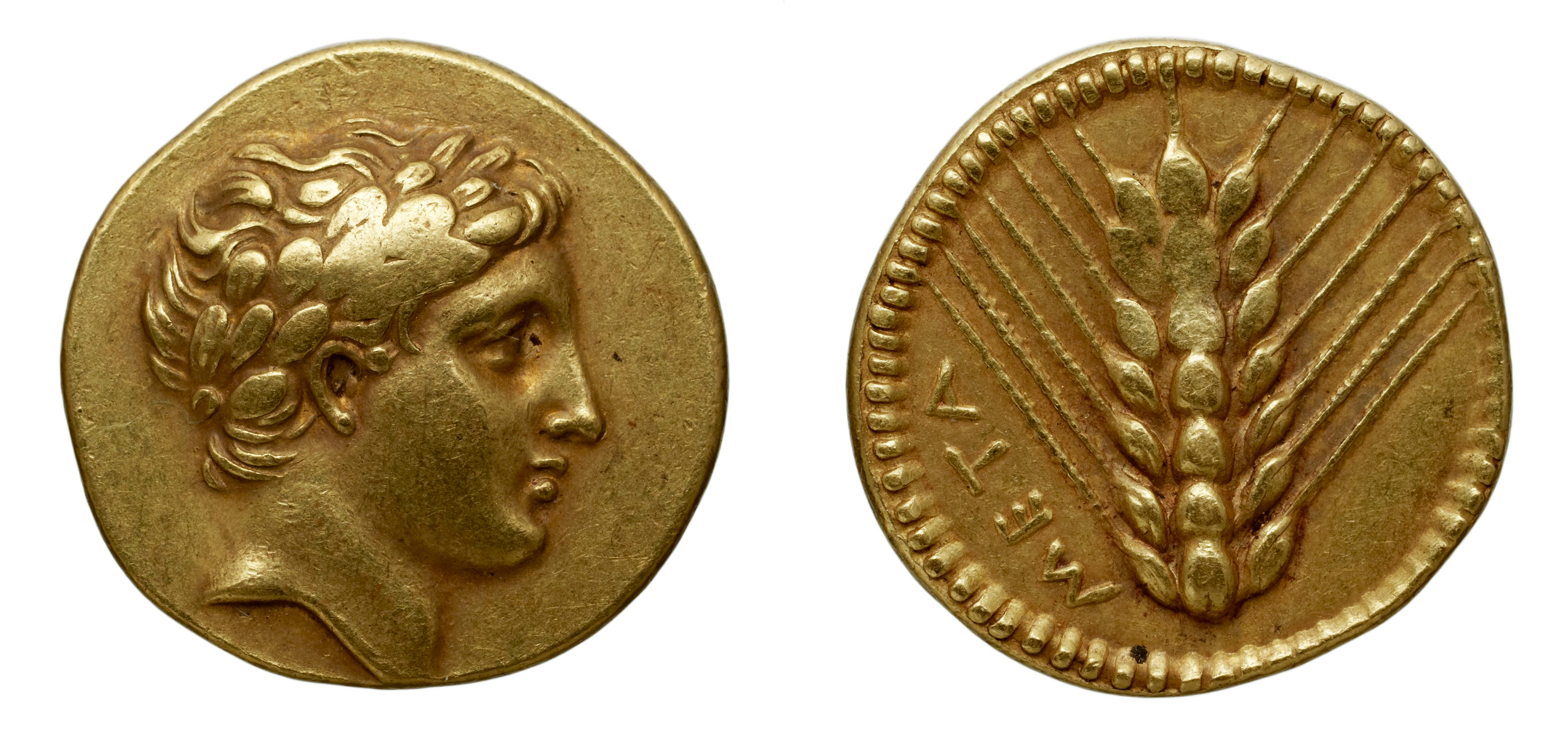
A Gold coin from Lucania dated between 620 and 294 BC

The Lucani spoke the Oscan language. There are a few inscriptions and coins in the area that survive from the 4th or 3rd century BC; they use the Greek alphabet.

== History ==
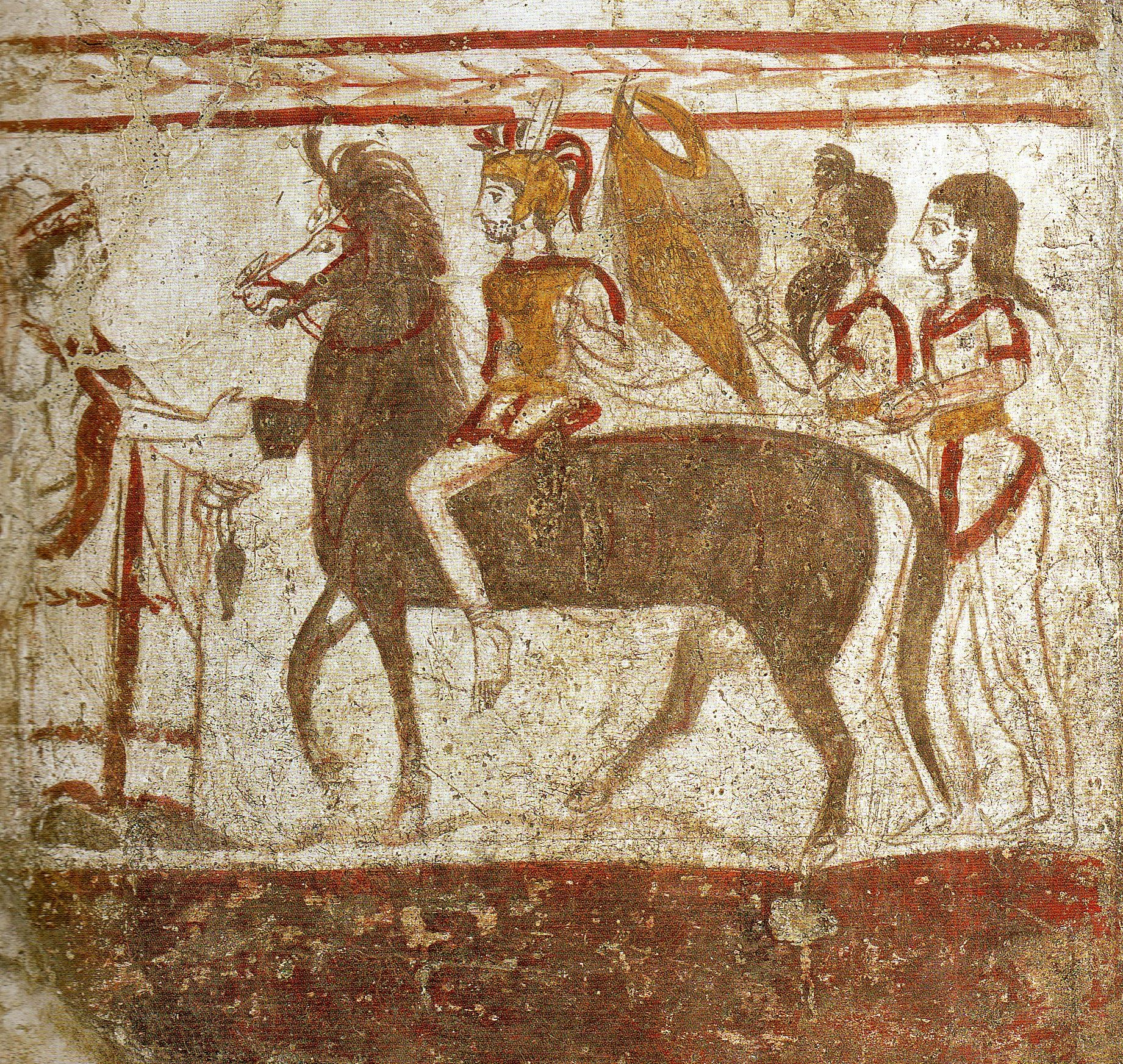
A mounted Lucani warrior, fresco from a tomb of Paestum, Italy, c. 360 BC

Around the middle of the 5th century BC, the Lucani moved south into Oenotria, driving the indigenous tribes, known to the Greeks as Oenotrians, Chones, and Lauternoi, into the mountainous interior.

The Lucanians were engaged in hostilities with the Greek colony of Taras/Tarentum and with Alexander, king of Epirus who was called in by the Tarentine people to their assistance in 334 BC. In 331, treacherous Lucanian exiles killed Alexander of Epirus.

In 298 they made alliance with Rome, and Roman influence was extended by the colonies of Venusia (291), Paestum (Greek Posidonia, refounded in 273), and above all Roman Tarentum (refounded in 272). Subsequently, however, the Lucanians suffered by choosing the losing side in the various wars on the peninsula in which Rome took part. During the Samnite Wars they were sometimes in alliance with Rome but more frequently engaged in hostilities.

The Lucanians and Bruttians laid siege to Thurii in 282 BC and a Roman army sent to its relief under Gaius Fabricius Luscinus defeated them.

When Pyrrhus of Epirus landed in Italy in 281, they were among the first to declare in his favour and after his abrupt departure they were reduced to subjection in a ten-year campaign (272). Enmity continued to run deep; they espoused the cause of Hannibal during the Second Punic War (216), and Lucania was ravaged by both armies during several campaigns. The region never recovered from these disasters and under the Roman government fell into decay to which the Social War, in which the Lucanians took part with the Samnites against Rome (91 - 88 BC), gave the finishing stroke.

In the time of Strabo (63 BC – 24 AD) the Greek cities on the coast had fallen into insignificance and, owing to the decrease of population and cultivation, malaria began to obtain the upper hand. The few towns of the interior were of no importance. A large part of the province was given up to pasture, and the mountains were covered with forests, which abounded in wild boars, bears and wolves.

== Art ==
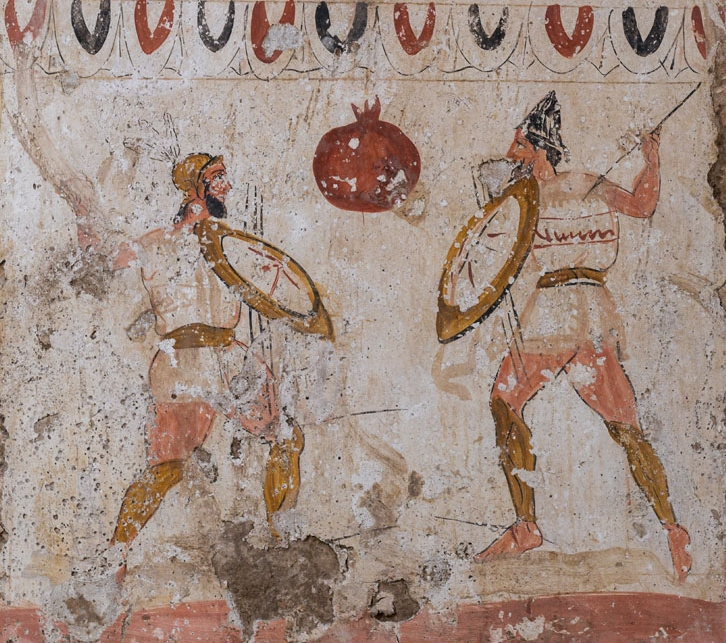
Duel of Lucanian warriors, fresco from a tomb of the 4th century BC.

Lucanian art mainly survives in Lucanian vase painting and paintings from tombs, which the elite commissioned in rather large numbers, like the Etruscans but unlike their Roman and Greek neighbours. There is a good display in the museum at Paestum. A high proportion feature horses, often racing. Vase painting was practiced between about 420 BC and 335 BC, and at its height vases were exported to all Apulia. The painters, some of whom have been assigned notnames, were probably Greek emigres, or trained in Greece - probably Athens to judge by their styles.

== Funerary rites ==
Burial customs were not homogenous across the entirety of the Lucanian territory, with at least three distinct subareas—each marked by their own particular mortuary rites—identifiable in the archaeological record. Of these, the "Oenotrian" area—which comprised the Agri and Sinni river valleys and the Tyrrhenian coast—produced burials wherein the deceased was laid in a supine position, the North Lucanians—who dwelt between the Basento and Bradano rivers—interred the dead in a fetal position, and the Eastern Lucanians—who lived in the modern Matera province—entombed the dead in a compacted position. Lucanian necropoleis were located outside of the settlement areas, and thus symbolically separated from the "world of the living." At Paestum, for instance, the graves were localized to two separate areas north and south of the city walls respectively, both of which consisted of several burial clusters organized around a central tomb. During the period of Lucanian dominance at Paestum, around the mid-5th century BCE, grave sites at the nearby Località Gaudo necropolis began to incorporate significantly higher quantities of funerary items than during the prior Greek period, implying that the new occupants of the city greatly valued displays of wealth or status in mortuary contexts.

== Gender roles ==
Within Lucanian cemeteries, male burials are associated with weapons and items related to the symposia, such as kraters, all of which imply an idealized image of a warrior who also held a prominent role within the social affairs of their community. Food items appear in one male burial from Montemurro—more specifically a cookie, a fig, a honeycomb, a grape, cheese, and a clay bun. These items were perhaps representative of the economic activities of the deceased in life—those being cereal growing, cheese production, and the cultivation of fruit trees. Female graves, in contrast, include items such as ornaments, loom weights, spinning tools, oinochoai, hydriai, or a lèbes gamikòs (nuptial-bowl), all of which emphasize the role of the woman as a wife or domestic worker. Both male and female tombs may contain lead or iron sets, varyingly consisting of andirons, spits, a candelabrum, or a knife.

There are certain Lucanian burials that seemingly defy the standard gender norms indicated by most funerary goods. Despite the association of warfare with masculinity, tomb 61 from Andriuolo—which belonged to a woman—is associated with slabs depicting a duel, two men greeting each other, a procession of multiple men, and also a separate frieze portraying weapons. To resolve the seeming incongruency between the gender associations of the items and the sex of the deceased, it has been suggested that the status of the interred woman was conveyed through depictions of their male family members. Yet another tomb from Andriuolo, this one belonging to a male, contains—alongside symposium equipment, a strigil, a bronze belt, and a knife—also a loom weight and a depiction of a funerary rite involving a deceased woman. Just as the aforementioned woman was represented through the male component of her family, this man was possibly represented via the female component of his family.

=== Symposia ===
Large ceramic or metallic vessels used for the drinking of wine were characteristic of upper-class burials in Lucania. In particular, kraters, which were usually red-figured, emerged as one of the hallmark traits of prominent male burials. Symposia equipment was not, however, confined exclusively to male graves—the skyphos vessel appears across tombs of both men and women, and it is one of the most common pottery styles for wine found in Lucanian tombs. The unisex distribution of the skyphos breaks with known Greek custom, wherein the vessel was reserved primarily for disempowered social groups, such as women or ephebes. There are numerous additional instances of female graves including sympotic equipment, such as tomb 8 from Montemurro, which includes a kantharos, a patera, a nestoris, a krater, amphorae, and small cups. This particular tomb is lavish, containing a total of 30 items all laid either by the sides or feet of the deceased. More traditionally feminine items do appear amongst this assemblage, such as a gamikòs, alabastron, and a pyxis, though there are no personal adornments beside a silver fibula. Furthermore, in the Gaudo necropolis by Paestum, there lies—at the center of a burial cluster—a female grave containing a bell krater and a column krater, which itself includes a skyphos, kylix, and a black-glaze pot, all of which are placed at the feet of this deceased. These burial items also appear in the male interments at the same site. Sympotic material often appears in tandem with other nonceramic items, such as the andirons, spits, and also simpula—a type of ladle used to remove wine from kraters.

The prevalence of sympotic material in female burials may indicate that—unlike Ancient Greece—women in Lucania were permitted to attend these events. If such a custom did exist, then it may have entered Lucanian culture via the Etruscans, who—besides allowing women at the symposia—were also major exporters of sympotic equipment to Southern Italy during the 5th-century BCE, and may therefore have spread cultural concepts alongside their trade routes. However, the majority of female tombs containing sympotic equipment were high-status, allowing for the possibility that these social freedoms were only available to upper-class women. In Ancient Greek society, symposia provided hosts with an opportunity to flaunt their wealth in front of their guests and community, which—if this cultural idea was shared with Italic peoples—could explain the deposition of symposia items primarily in more prestigious tombs.

If it is accepted that Lucanian women were involved with the symposia, then it is still unclear whether they were active participants or merely responsible for more tangential roles such as storing, preparing, or serving the food and beverages consumed at the banquet. However, according to the archaeologists Chiara Albanesi and Ilaria Battiloro, it is perhaps unlikely that a culture would choose to entomb an individual with grave goods relating only to a minor function within an otherwise important ritual. Alternatively, according to the classicist Sarah Pomeroy, it is possible that these sympotic goods were deposited by male relatives as a means of signifying the familia ties of the deceased woman or as a parting gift. Against this view, Albanesi and Battiloro argue that such a practice would be "odd," or even "offensive," if women were excluded from symposia.

Another burial located at the center of a funerary group—this one from La Scala, by Roccagloriosa—includes a neck amphora amongst its assemblage, which is typically considered a masculine item within Lucanian culture due to its association with symposia. This same burial also contains an olla, which was used to store food for sacrifices; a patera, which was used in libation rituals; and a knife, which was used to perform animal sacrifices. The religious nature of these grave goods may indicate that the deceased served as a priestess in life. Other tombs from the Lucanian area demonstrate a connection between sympotic items and ritual sacrifice: In a separate tomb, also from Roccagloriosa, knives were placed near a krater, whereas a different grave from San Martino d’Agri includes amphorae that itself contained a knife.

== Religion ==
=== Sanctuaries ===
==== Archaic period ====
There is scant evidence for religious activity in the region during the archaic period from the 8th to the 5th centuries BCE, and what little evidence has been found largely consists of votive offerings such as terracotta figurines or vessels, with no evidence of any monumental cult sites. It is possible that such sites did indeed exist yet are unrecognizable as sacred within the archaeological record, or perhaps remain undiscovered as a consequence of limited archaeological research in Lucanian territory. There is, however, evidence that—during the archaic period—domestic and ritual spaces were not separated. At Satriano, archaeologists unearthed an ancient anaktoron that—besides potentially housing the local political leader—also included a circle built of limestone and lithic chips, which itself perhaps functioned as an altar. Sets of pottery were discovered near the altar, which were perhaps involved in pre-banquet rituals such as wine libations or animal sacrifice. Another site, a house from Roccagloriosa dating to the 4th-century BCE, includes—within its central courtyard—a structure with a central beam and a pitched roof. This shrine perhaps commemorated a familial cult centered around an oligarchical family, presumably the inhabitants of the household themselves. However, it was not necessarily reserved for members of said family—the large size of the area combined with the quantity of diversity of artifacts implies a wider range of visitors.

==== Topography and administration ====
During the 4th-century BCE, Lucanian sanctuaries were often located downhill and near a natural spring, most usually outside of settlements, However, sanctuaries were nevertheless often closely linked with a nearby urban area, and they were usually placed in proximity to important local communication routes. Consequently, these sites would have served as the ideal locales for communal gatherings or ceremonies. The geographical relationship between sanctuaries and settlements most likely reflects a political connection, which is itself otherwise attested in the epigraphic record of nearby Samnium. For instance, one Samnite inscription mentions a meddix touticus—a type of political official—who was responsible for the upkeep of a sanctuary in Pietrabbondante. In the Lucanian temple of Mefitis at Rossano di Vaglio, one inscription mentions the divine epithet Utiana, which has been etymologically connected to the gentilicium Utius. If this theory is accepted, then it could imply that—like the Samnites—the Lucani also placed their sanctuaries under the authority of aristocratic families.

There is one known exception to the general rule of extramural sanctuaries: The site of Civita di Tricarico includes a temple that was well-integrated into the local community—it was situated on the same plateau as the residential areas, and it utilized the same water channels as the nearby houses. In total contrast to Tricarico, Rossano is the only known Lucanian sanctuary not relatable to any urban area. Links with the site Serra di Vaglio have been proposed, yet this theory is itself marred by the distance between the Serra and Rossano di Vaglio, which are situated 10 kilometres (6.2 mi) apart. Rossano is further unique in that it is characterized a much larger quantity of inscriptions and votive offerings than any other Lucanian site. Moreover, the votives at Rossano were usually of higher quality than those at other sanctuaries and they were often imported rather than, as was more common in ancient Lucania, domestically manufactured. However, De Martino notes that the majority of inscriptions discovered at Rossano date from the end of the 3rd to the 2nd-centuries BCE, during the Roman period, thus allowing for the possibility that the epigraphic material at this is subject to Roman influence. Regardless, on the basis of its numerous peculiarities, Rossano has been construed as a "federal" sanctuary, one representative of the entire Lucanian ethnicity rather than any particular community. De Martino, however, also contradicts this notion, arguing that the Lucanian culture did not develop federal modes of government until the Second Punic War (218 – 201 BCE), before which time they were all administered separately by distinct political entities.

==== Layout ====
Lucanian religious sites from the 4th-century BCE onwards do include more grandiose architecture than in previous periods, though they lacked any Greek-style temples. One temple was eventually constructed in Civita di Tricarico, although this site dates to the 3rd-century BCE, during the period when Romanization began to take effect in the region. The remains of walls have been uncovered at certain sanctuaries, such as at Timmari, hinting at the former presence of a temenos structure dividing the sacred from the ordinary space. Open courtyards were present in some Lucanian sanctuaries, such as at Rossano, which contained a large open space dubbed the sagrato that itself included a 27.5-by-4.5-metre (90 ft × 15 ft) large altar. According to the archaeologist Gianluca De Martino, the Lucanian open religious spaces probably connect to the similar sanctuary courtyards known from Samnium, which themselves may relate to the Etruscan practice of allocating unroofed areas for augury. Ultimately, De Martino concludes that the open spaces of Lucania probably allowed for the inclusion of the sky in ceremonial rites and facilitated some sort of communion between the Earth and the divine.

The connection between water and sanctuaries was extremely strong: All known Lucanian sanctuaries include water-infrastructure, such as pipes, basins, or fountains. Much of this infrastructure was designed to collect and store water, such as at Chiaromonte, where wells stood beside the ceremonial path, and at Armento, where there existed an elaborate network of pipes designed to ferry water from the spring to a cistern. The ancient importance of water in the local region may have left traces in later Italian toponyms, such as Fontana Bona in Ruoti. Water was perhaps utilized in libations, as indicated by the presence of ritual vessels such as skyphoi and paterae. However, water may have also fulfilled more practical roles: It could have helped clean the blood from a sacrifice, perhaps performed some role in the production of objects such as clay votives or metal items, or it may have merely supplied attendants with a source of drink. According to Battiloro, it is likely that water assumed an important position within Lucanian religious life on account of its own significance within ordinary life—water is vital for any human or animal population and is a necessary component of agriculture. Moreover, according to the archaeologist Edward Herring, spring water is unique in that it may appear to "miraculously" emerge from the ground, which could compel ancient people to identify a supernatural origin for the phenomenon.

===== Sacellum =====
Lucanian sanctuaries were characterized by the presence of a sacellum, alternatively referred to as an oikos, which was a type of shrine situated at the center of the religious site with a single entrance and enclosed within a square wall. That the sacellum was of extraordinary cultural importance is indicated by its continual preservation at various sites throughout multiple periods. In Torre di Satriano, for instance, the local populace conserved the sacellum even though they allowed other buildings to fall into disuse. Moreover, in San Chirico Nuovo, the earliest known building at the sanctuary is rectangular sacellum that was replaced by a later square structure, which was itself eventually destroyed, though the locals erected an entirely new identical sacellum. The importance of this structure is further reinforced by the presence of temenos walls around certain sites, which could encircle the sacella just as they could enclose the overarching sanctuary.

Regarding the purpose of the structure, it perhaps functioned as the abode of a god, and there is evidence that may have housed cult statues. In the sacellum at San Chirico Nuovo, archaeologists discovered a portion of a clay statue in a posthole that possibly portrayed the god who originally dwelt within the site. According to Battiloro, it is possible that this figurine was a votive item deposited when the sanctuary was abandoned. The archaeologist Emanuele Greco notes the existence of specifically feminine votives at Satriano, including loom weights, female coroplastic figurines, coroplastic depictions of uteri, and fragments of the enthroned goddess style of statuette. Based upon this evidence, Greco has suggested that the sacella perhaps symbolically represented the púrgos, which was a section of a house primarily managed by women. Whereas the aforementioned votive artifacts strongly indicate that the Satriano sacellum honored a goddess, fragments of a bronze statue of Hercules have also been uncovered in a possible sacellum at Armento, (Note: The site at Armento contains few coroplastic objects and its layout more closely resembles Lucanian residential buildings, which may imply that the site was not originally a sanctuary. However, according to Battiloro, the presence of miniature weapons, the size of the sacellum, and that the building was constructed atop terraces all favor the interpretation of the area as a sanctuary site.) which could indicate that sacella in general could honor either male or female gods.

The sacella were themselves usually surrounded by a complex of multiple rooms, only some of which were roofed. According to Battiloro, these additional areas often provided space for the preparation and consumption of food. For example, at Rivello, the sacellum was divided into two rooms, one of which contained remnants of organic material and charcoal, implying that this particular area fulfilled a culinary purpose. Furthermore, rooms 3 and 9 at the sanctuary of Armento were perhaps dedicated to cooking, as indicated by the presence of ash layers filled with animal bones. Animal bones, these ones of pigs, bovines, and sheep, were also uncovered within room 4 of the site—they lay both strewn about the floor and deposited within two ditches on the eastern side of the room. Battiloro interprets these discoveries as evidence that room 4 likewise served as a space for cooking, though she also argues that the room housed banquets, as evidenced by the presence of amphorae for drinking wine, a large hearth, and a rectangular counter formed from unbaked clay and covered with tiles. Moreover, three paterae containing bird bones were placed atop this counter. The disparate rooms of these sanctuary complexes were connected by paved pathways that were sometimes porticoed. At San Chirico Nuovo, for example, the central sacellum was connected to an external spring by a 12-metre (39 ft) long porticoed walkway, which was probably at least partially topped by a roof supported by wooden pillars.

=== Votive offerings ===
Lucanian votive offerings often consisted of objects that otherwise hold a more generic practical application. For instance, weapons such as spear points, knives, or swords could serve as offerings, all of which were objects associated with warfare, itself an important aspect of a masculinity in Lucanian culture. Votive weapons or armor appear at numerous sites throughout Lucania, though they are nevertheless fewer in number than terracotta statues and typically only present in limited quantities. However, Rossano and Timmari are both peculiar in that they reveal an unusually large number of votive weaponry. In certain circumstances, the deposited weapons were miniaturized, indicating that they were most likely purely symbolic and not actual tools used in combat. Moreover, in Rossano, many of these items were broken in some manner, implying that the suppliants themselves were willing to ceremonially damage the objects, even if, in doing so, they hindered the object's utility for its original purpose.

Agricultural equipment also appear as votive offerings, though only at Rossano and Timmari. More specifically, at Rossano archaeologists unearthed a single sickle and plowshare each, whereas at Timmari they discovered an axe, a hatchet, two hoes, and four sickles. It has been suggested that these artifacts may have symbolically commemorated an individual's working life after they have reached retirement. Alternatively, noting that these items are confined to only the wealthiest known Lucanian sanctuaries, Battiloro proposes that they instead referenced the ownership of land and the associated social status. It is probable that these votive offerings were also associated with the male sphere, as agricultural tools pertain to outdoors labor.

Female votive items, in contrast, perhaps pertained to domestic labor, such as the various loom weights and carding tools that have been discovered at Lucanian sanctuaries. Like weapons, certain loom weights were also miniaturized, and some lack a suspension hole, indicating that they were probably always intended as votive offerings and never functioned as a usable tool. The interpretation of other loom weights is more controversial; some examples may not have served as votives themselves and were perhaps designed to seal the other dedicatory items. Besides domestic tools, there is also evidence of feminine votive offerings that served a cosmetic function, though ornamental votives are rare across Lucania. Nevertheless, bronze fibulae appear at Rossano; both bronze and silver fibulae appear at Timmari; and bracelets, necklaces, rings, or earrings are all present at Colla di Rivello. Just as Rossano and Timmari display an unusually large number of masculine votive weaponry, they also contain and atypically high quantity of feminine votive adornments.

==== Sculptures ====
Terracotta figurines were the most common votive offering in, not just Lucanian, but also the whole of Magna Graecia. These goods were usually produced locally, though they still often utilized Greek molds, themselves likely imported from workshops along the Southern Italian coastline. The usage of molding techniques cheapened the manufacturing process, rendering the goods more easily accessible to poor segments of the population, which itself probably helped facilitate the popularity of these objects across Lucania. Moreover, the usage of Greek models in particular probably contributed to the relative typological standardization of Lucanian statuettes, which largely conformed to similar technological and artistic features. From the 4th-3rd centuries BCE, terracotta figurines depicting female figures were among the most common types of votive offerings within the Lucanian culture. The predominance of female votive suggests at least that the dedication of statuettes was particularly common ritual for honoring goddesses, a practice which is also known from Greek culture. According to De Martino, it is likely that male deities were propitiated through alternative means.

Numerous sculptures are attested at Rivello, where the most common type was adorned with a himation, a chiton, and a polos that sometimes had an accompanying veil. The figures often carry a cross torch alongside an additional item, such as a piglet, calathus, cista, or oinochoe. One type of votive, the "step-like structure" was particularly common from the 4th to the first half of the 3rd-centuries BCE. It is likely that these statues once were depicted as sitting upon a wooden chair, though the surviving figures lack any base. These statues are frequently portrayed holding items such as a ball; a fan; an animal, such as a dove, swan, or hare; a mirror; wool balls; a tympanon; some fruit; or a calathus with fruits. According to Albanesi and Battiloro, it is likely that many of these objects symbolically denote Lucanian gender roles for women. They argue that the calathus—being a wool basket—represents spinning, the flower indicates virginity, the tympanon and ball represent the childhood that is to be abandoned upon entering marriage, and the mirror and fan represent contemporary beauty standards. The statue itself may depict a worshipper, as they lack any divine accoutrements, such as the polos and a throne.

Divine attributes are, however, present on another type of statuette, the "enthroned goddess" variety, indicating that this class of votive does depict a divinity. Furthermore, this figure usually appears alongside a patera and a basket of fruits, which—according to Battiloro—may represent libations and soil fertility respectively. Overall, the "enthroned goddess" type is rare throughout Lucania, only appearing at a handful of sites such as Ruoti or Satriano. Certain seated female statuettes are depicted with a veiled head, which—in Greek culture—is associated with the acquisition of marital status. Similarly, in Lucanian society, the veil may have symbolized the protection of a deity during the transition from a virgin girl to a bride. Specifically at Paestum, during the 5th-century BCE, a type of kourotrophos figurine emerged wherein the seated goddess was portrayed carrying an infant. This new sculpture-type perhaps emerged under the influence of the growing Lucanian influence in the city, as such images of mother figures are commonplace in the artwork of other Italic peoples, and kourotrophos figurines appear in Latial, Etruscan, and Campanian religious sites.

Seated female statues, alongside other types of Lucanian terracotta figurines, became less common during the 3rd-century BCE, when they were replaced by Tangara-style figurines, likely due to Hellenistic influence. Tangara figurines were themselves not particularly common at Lucanian sites, at least when compared to the number of such artifacts in contemporary Greek sites. According to De Martino, the burgeoning popularity of Tangara style figurines likely reflects a cultural shift away from coroplastic representation of divinity, as is also attested in the Geek city-states of Magna Graecia.

The fruits most frequently carried by the worshipper figurines or held in the baskets of the goddess of the goddess statues were pomegranates. Depictions of fruits, primarily the pomegranate, were prevalent at Lucanian cult sites, with almost all known Lucanian sanctuaries including types of votive terracotta fruits. These objects appear most frequently at the largest sites, such as Rossano, yet are rarer at smaller sanctuaries such as Satriano. Within Ancient Greek culture, pomegranates were connected to the cults of Hera, Demeter, Kore, and Aphrodite. They symbolized fertility and abundance, on account of their numerous seeds, but they were also associated with death and the underworld on account of their blood red juice. Besides terracotta models of fruits, Lucanian devotees also offered clay votives depicting animals such as sheep, cows, pigs, or doves. According to Battiloro, these model animals perhaps served as substitutes for the sacrifice of real animals or possibly as thank offerings in reciprocation of a good harvest or divine protection of agriculture.

Terracotta busts and protomai also appear throughout Lucania, all of which depict female figures. These sculptures are uncommon at the majority of sanctuaries, though they appear in unusually large numbers at sites such as Grumentum, Timmari, and Rossano. Within these particular sanctuaries, there is internal variety between the differing busts. At Rossano, for instance, even though the majority of busts all portray a draped woman ornamented with a polos, there are certain unique artworks, such as a bust that portrays a female head rising from the leaves of a plant. Likewise, at Timmari, there are varying separate ornamental garments used to outfit the busts: Some busts are depicted draped, with an accompanying polos and a large fibula, whereas others wear a polos or a korymbos and lack any further decoration on the busts themselves. Moreover, at both Timmari and Grumentum, the size of the sculptures varies greatly: Busts at Timmari range from 12–50 centimetres (4.7–19.7 in) and certain busts at Grumentum are life-sized.

=== Deities ===
Attestation of Lucanian deities appears at the sanctuary of Rossano, where epigraphic evidence demonstrates that the site was dedicated to Mefitis, a goddess who—given her prominent role within such a significant religious site—likely also held an important position among the Lucanian pantheon. Other inscriptions from Rossano mention various other deities, including Jupiter, Hercules, and Mamers, with one additional possible mention of Venus on a 2nd-century BCE inscription, though it is unclear this text treats Venus as a separate goddess or merely equates her with Mefitis. The sites of Grumentum and Potenza reveal the only other known mentions of any Lucanian deity, all of which exclusively refer to Mefitis. Rossano also furnishes the majority of known artistic depictions of male deities in Lucanian society, though, overall, there are only a few such figurines.

Bronze statues depicting Hercules appear at Armento, which could imply the existence of a cult dedicated to the divinity at this site. As a god, Hercules perhaps represented concepts such as warfare and athleticism, as is reflected in various votive objects from the area, such as aryballoi, strigils, and weapons. Additionally, an image of a male deity appears in a sculpture depicting a god and goddess standing beside each other, perhaps as part of a hierogamy, or divine marriage. Most known figurines of male deities portray minor gods, such as at Rossano, Timmari, and Torre di Satriano, where various votive objects perhaps portraying Eros have been discovered. Though Eros was himself a male god, his cult is implicitly connected to Aphrodite, thus still allowing for a connection with female fertility. Figures depicting a minor eastern deity Attis, have been uncovered at Rossano. Despite the limited artistic evidence for male deities, the worship of more gods is proven by the epigraphic record, and it could also have been inferred from the existence of fertility and fecundity cults, given that a masculine half is a necessary aspect of human reproduction. In ancient Italic cultures, the gender of deities was somewhat malleable, thereby allowing for female deities to become male in certain situations.

== Society ==
Archaeological evidence from tombs dated to the end of 5th-century BCE at San Brancato di Sant’Arcangelo indicates that, at this time, Lucanian society had little stratification, as there was little differentiation between the grave goods across each burial. Male burials were almost always defined by the appearance of bronze belts or spears, while female graves were marked by the presence of lebetes gamikoi and lekythoi. By the mid 4th-century BCE, the funerary assemblages become increasingly diverse, with some female burials now including jewelry and certain male burials now containing knives, skyphoi, cups, lead spits, andirons, candelabra, bronze basins, and unpainted ollae. These additional funerary items perhaps specially signified wealth or status, and they thus imply a greater degree of social division.

Certain Lucanian sites reveal exceptionally lavish 'princely' burials identified by their ornate grave goods, which usually comprised rare or valuable materials such as weapons, vases, or jewelry. These ostentatious tombs perhaps represent prominent figures within the local communities, itself implying an oligarchical mode of organized centered around select families. Alongside archaeological evidence, there is literary evidence corroborating the notion of a Lucanian aristocracy. Livy, a 1st-century BCE Roman historian, references "three hundred illustrious families" given to Alexander the Molossian as hostages after his conquests in Southern Italy during the 4th-century BCE. Livy also mentions that Alexander had found both allies and enemies amongst the Lucani, which could reflect differences between separate aristocratic families regarding which side of the war they joined. Beneath the aristocratic class lay an intermediate group of landowners, who occupied the farms and households excavated throughout Lucanian territory. Lucanian society can be construed as a type of military democracy, as—according to the 1st-century BCE geographer Strabo—the Lucanians were democratic, yet they elected a king ("βασιλεὺς," "basileùs") to lead them during wartime.

== See also ==
- List of ancient Italic peoples
