= Grottole =

- Comune
- Comune di Grottole
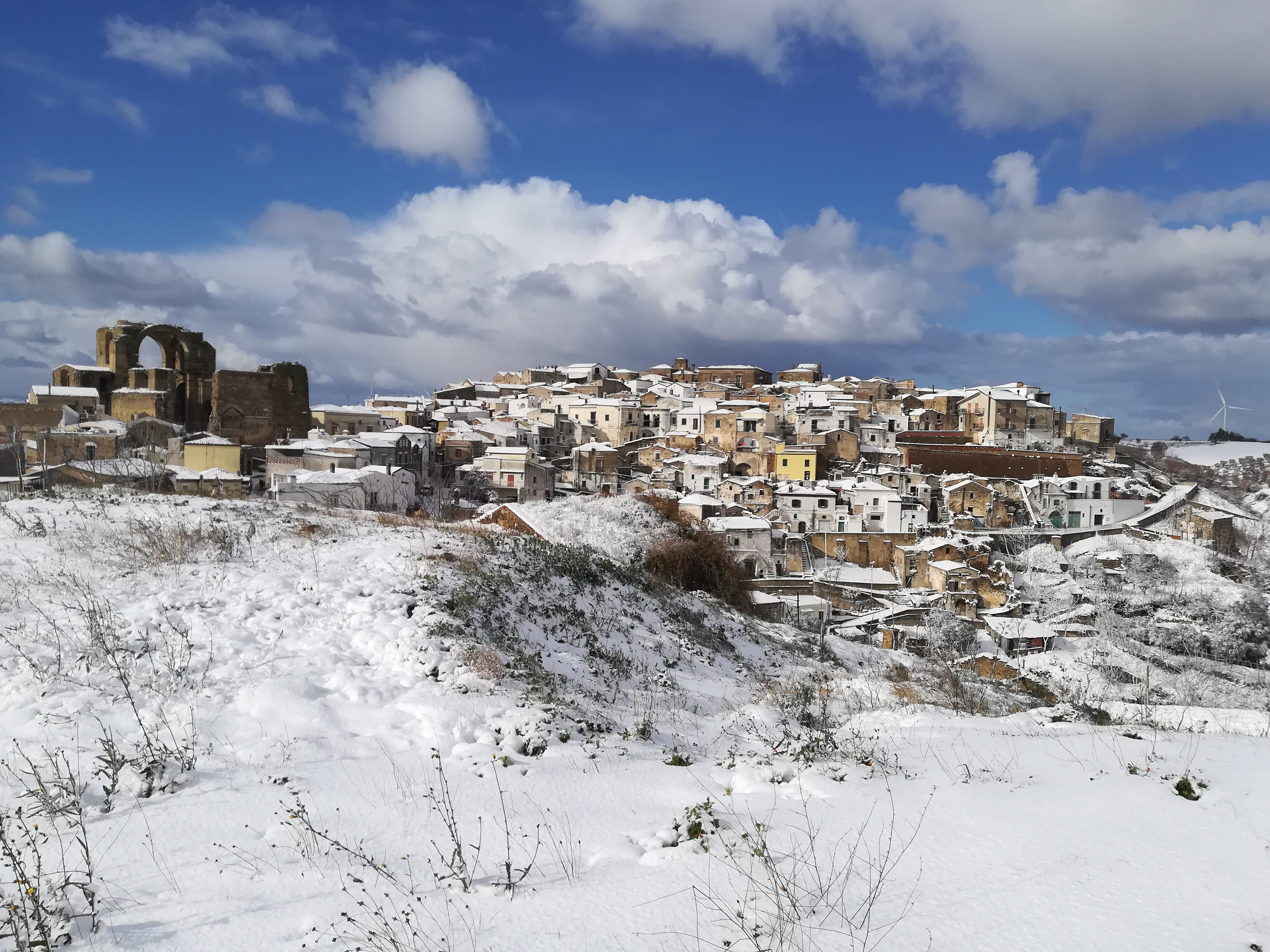
- View of Grottole

- Location within Italy Location within Basilicata
- Coordinates: 40°36′N 16°23′E
- Country: Italy
- Region: Basilicata
- Province: Matera (MT)

Government
  - Mayor: Francesco Di Giacomo

Area
  - Total: 117.15 km^{2} (45.23 sq mi)
- Elevation: 481 m (1,578 ft)

Population (31 December 2017)
  - Total: 2,186
  - Density: 18.66/km^{2} (48.33/sq mi)
- Demonym: Grottolesi
- Time zone: UTC+1 (CET)
  - Summer (DST): UTC+2 (CEST)
- Postal code: 75010
- Dialing code: 0835
- ISTAT code: 077012
- Patron saint: Saint Roch
- Saint day: 16 August
- Website: Official website

Grottole (Lucano: Jròttl') is a town and comune in the province of Matera, in the region of Basilicata in southern Italy.

== Geography ==
The village of Grottole extends along a crest in a territory rich in waters: the Basento and Bradano rivers, the Basentello and Bilioso torrents and the smaller streams Cupolo, Rovivo and Acquaviva.

As with most old towns of the area, Grottole was strategically built on a mountain, standing 481 meters above sea level. At this altitude, the town was less susceptible to attack and also insects.

== History ==
Human presence dates back to very ancient times, as testified by the many prehistoric caves below the present town: its Latin name was in fact Cryptulae, meaning "small grottos" in Latin.

The territory was inhabited by the Greeks between the 13th and 12th century BC, when it was part of their Metaponto colony, one of the most important in Magna Graecia. In Roman times Grottole was a Municipium. After the fall of the Western Roman Empire, it was part of the medieval Principality of Salerno; in this period a castle was built. It was later ruled by many feudal families, among them the Orsini-Del Balzo and Zurlo-Pisciscelli, then from 1547 to 1639 it was under the Sancez De Luna d'Aragona, who were followed by the Caracciolo of Melissano, Spinelli of San Giorgio and finally, from 1738, the Sanseverino from Bisignano.

Records of the year 1010 show Grottole as a town with 13,000 inhabitants, but plagues and wars reduced the number to a little over 4,000 in 1133. Later records mentions about 1300 people in 1493, and 2010 in 1783.

After the explosive demographic growth of the 19th century, there was another drop in the population because of emigration; the current population is around 2,100.
