= Bilioso =

Location
- Country: Italy

Physical characteristics
- Source
  - location: near Tricarico and San Chirico Nuovo
- Mouth: Bradano
  - coordinates: 40.6514°N 16.4112°E

Basin features
- Progression: Bradano→ Gulf of Taranto

The Bilioso is a river in the province of Matera in the Basilicata region of Italy. Its source is near Tricarico and San Chirico Nuovo and the border with the province of Potenza. The river flows southeast and curves northeast before again flowing southeast. It flows north of Grassano before entering the Bradano as a right tributary near Lago di San Giuliano (shortly after the Basentello does the same).
