= Alvo =

Alvo may refer to:

- Alvo, Nebraska, a village
- Oxaprozin, from trade name
- Alvo (river), a river in southern Italy
