= Sassi di Matera =

UNESCO World Heritage Site
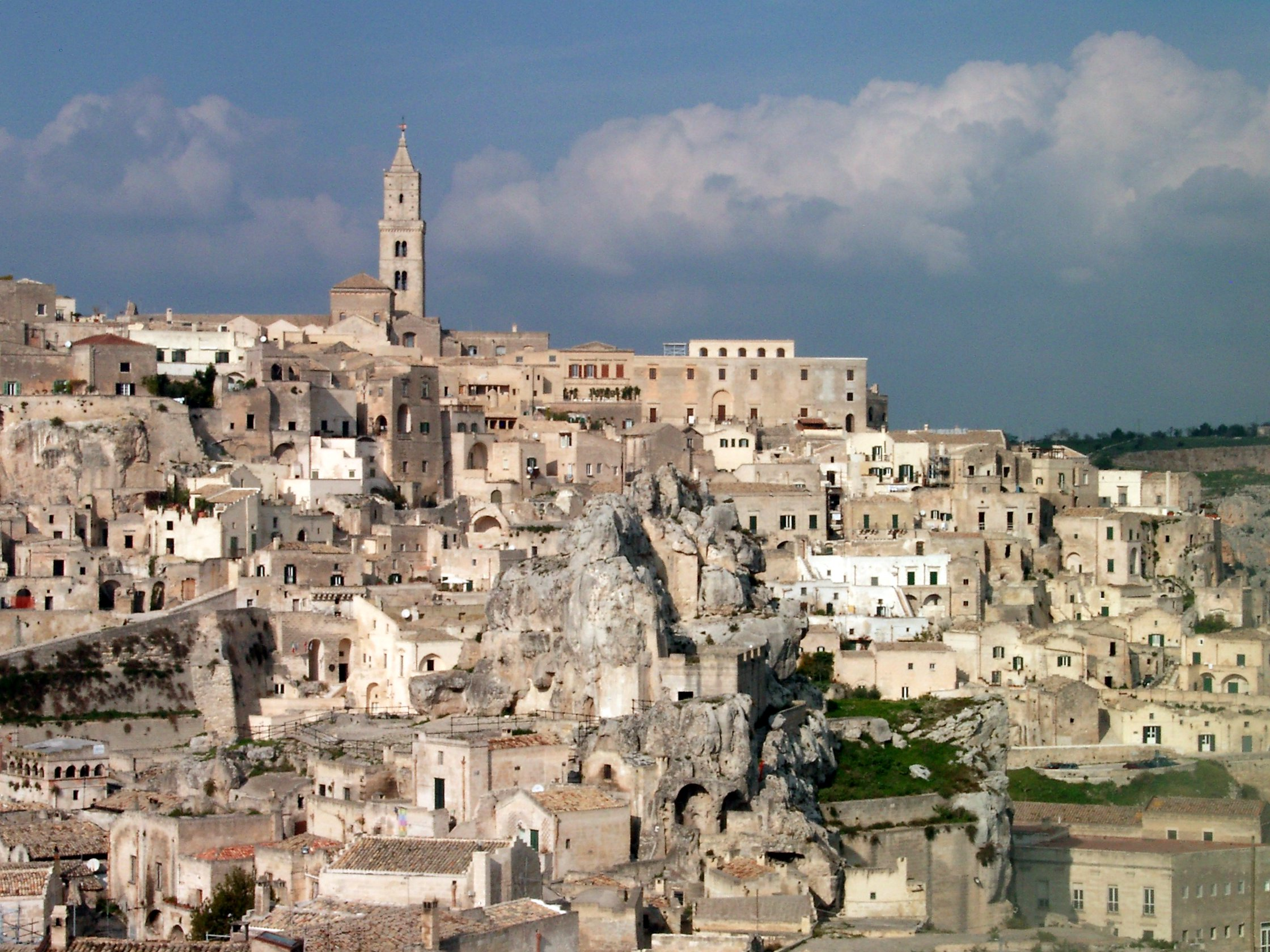
- The Sassi of Matera

- Location within Basilicata Location within Italy
- Location: Province of Matera, Basilicata, Italy
- Part of: The Sassi and the Park of the Rupestrian Churches of Matera
- Criteria: Cultural: (iii), (iv), (v)
- Reference: 670
- Inscription: 1993 (17th Session)
- Area: 1,016 ha (2,510 acres)
- Buffer zone: 4,365 ha (10,790 acres)
- Coordinates: 40°40′00″N 16°36′30″E

The Sassi di Matera are two districts (Sasso Caveoso and Sasso Barisano) of the Italian city of Matera, Basilicata, well-known for their ancient cave dwellings inhabited since the Paleolithic period.

The "Sassi" have been described by Fodor's as "one of the most unique landscapes in Europe". Along with the park of the Rupestrian Churches, it was named a World Heritage Site by UNESCO in 1993.

== History ==
The Sassi originate from a prehistoric troglodyte settlement and are suspected to be among the first human settlements in Italy. There is evidence that people were living here as early as the year 7000 BC.

The Sassi are houses dug into the calcarenitic rock itself, which is characteristic of Basilicata and Apulia, locally called "tufo", though it is neither volcanic tuff, nor tufa limestone. The streets in some parts of the Sassi often run on top of other houses. The ancient town grew up on one slope of the ravine created by the Gravina river. The ravine is known locally as "la Gravina".

The term sasso derives from Latin saxum, meaning a hill, rock or great stone.

In the 1950s, the government of Italy forcefully relocated most of the population of the Sassi to areas of the developing modern city. Beset by extreme poverty and riddled with malaria, the unhealthy living conditions were considered inhuman and an affront to the modern new Italian Republic of Alcide De Gasperi. However, people continued to live in the Sassi, and according to the English Fodor's guide:

Matera is the only place in the world where people can boast to be still living in the same houses of their ancestors of 9,000 years ago.

Until the late 1980s this was considered an area of poverty, since many of these houses were, and in some cases still are, uninhabitable. The current local administration, however, has become more tourism-oriented, and it has promoted the regeneration of the Sassi with the aid of the European Union, the government, and UNESCO. Today there are many thriving businesses, pubs, and hotels there, as described in an April 2015 article in The New Yorker.

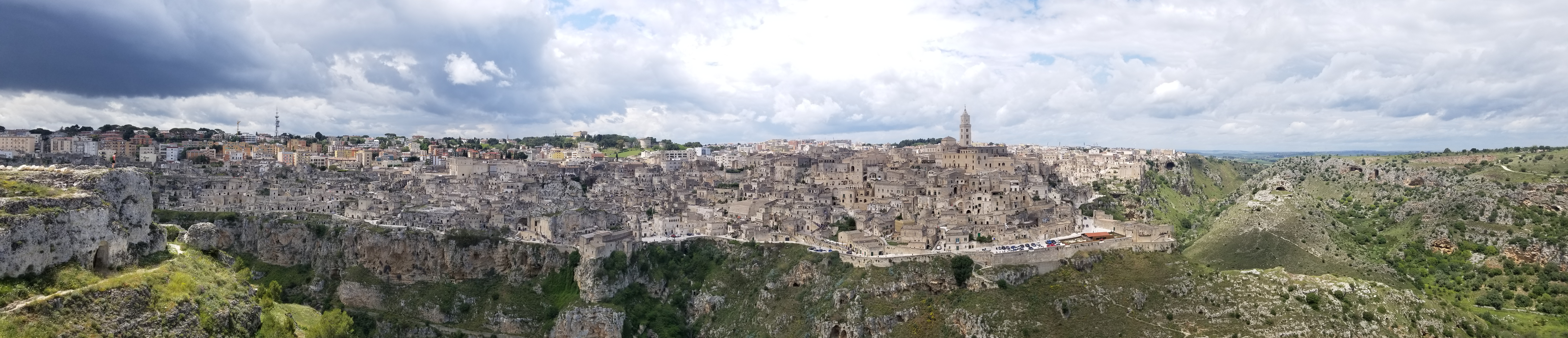
View from the Canyon (Gravina)

== Geography ==
The "Sassi" grew in the area of Murgia Plateau, extended between Apulia and Basilicata. Along with the "Civita" and the "Piano", the two Sassi form Matera's Old Town.

== Culture ==
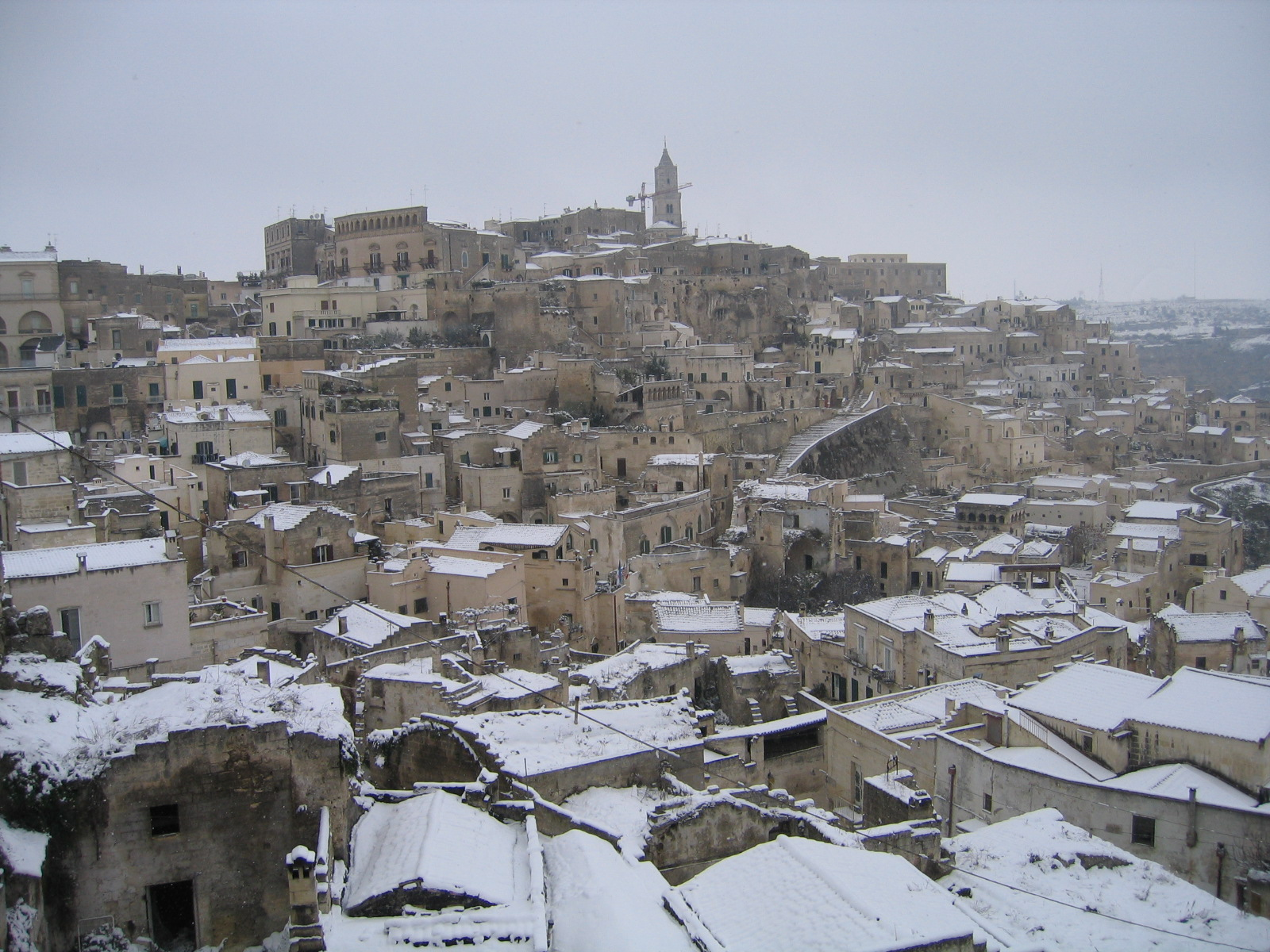
Sassi with snow (December 2007)

The Sassi are visually reminiscent of ancient sites in and around Jerusalem, and for this reason they have been used in many Christian-themed films, including The Gospel According to St. Matthew (Pier Paolo Pasolini, 1964), The Passion of the Christ (Mel Gibson, 2004), The Nativity Story (Catherine Hardwicke, 2006) and Ben-Hur (Timur Bekmambetov, 2016).

They also appeared in Patty Jenkins's Wonder Woman (2017), serving as a location for the Amazons' city Themyscira, and Cary Joji Fukunaga's No Time to Die (2021), where a scene with James Bond's Aston Martin racing through was shot.

== Music ==
In 2016 the band Corde Oblique released a song, "I sassi di Matera", on the album "I Maestri del Colore". The song is divided into two parts, the first inspired by the so-called Sasso Barisano, and the second by the Sasso Caveoso.

== Gallery ==
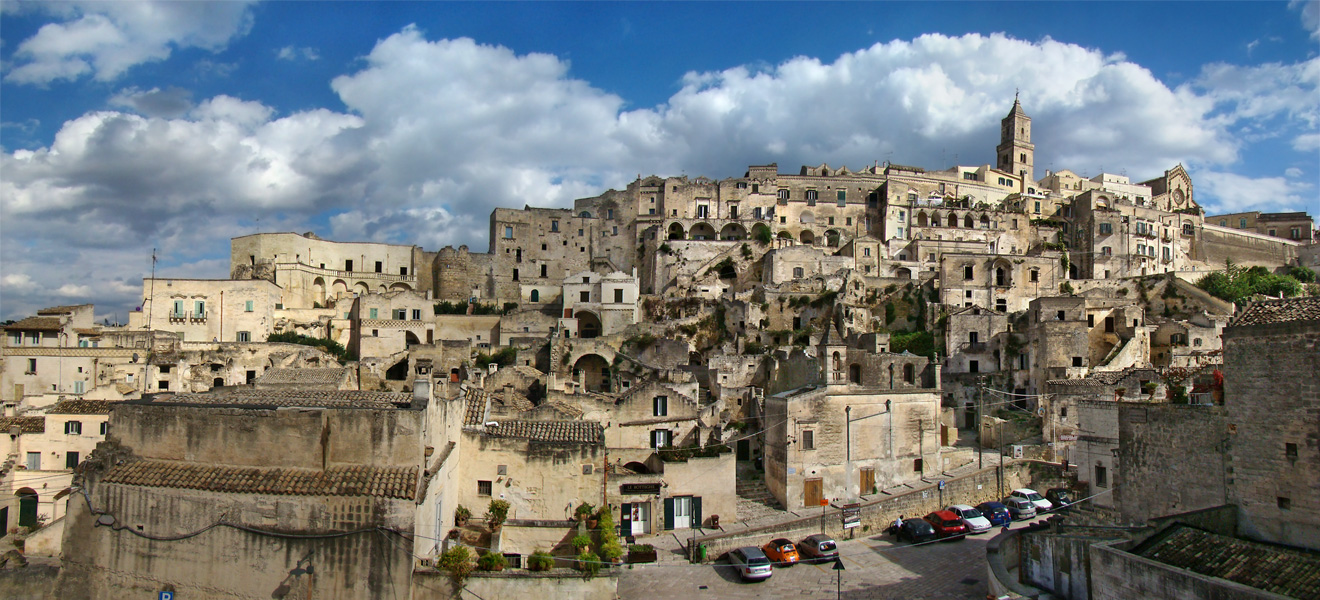
Sasso Barisano

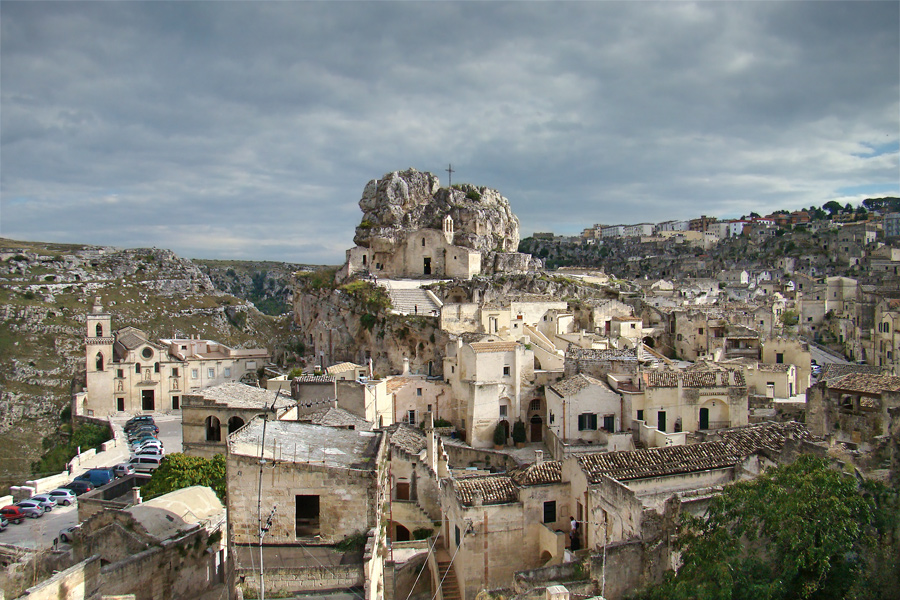
Sasso Caveoso

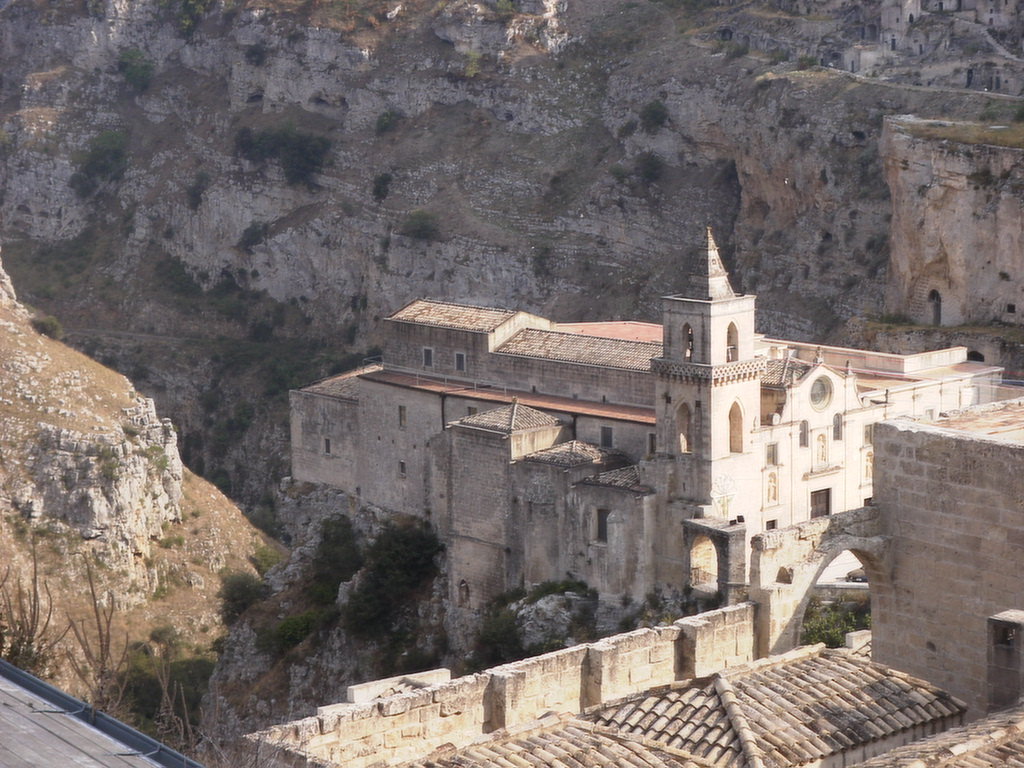
Church of St. Pietro Caveoso

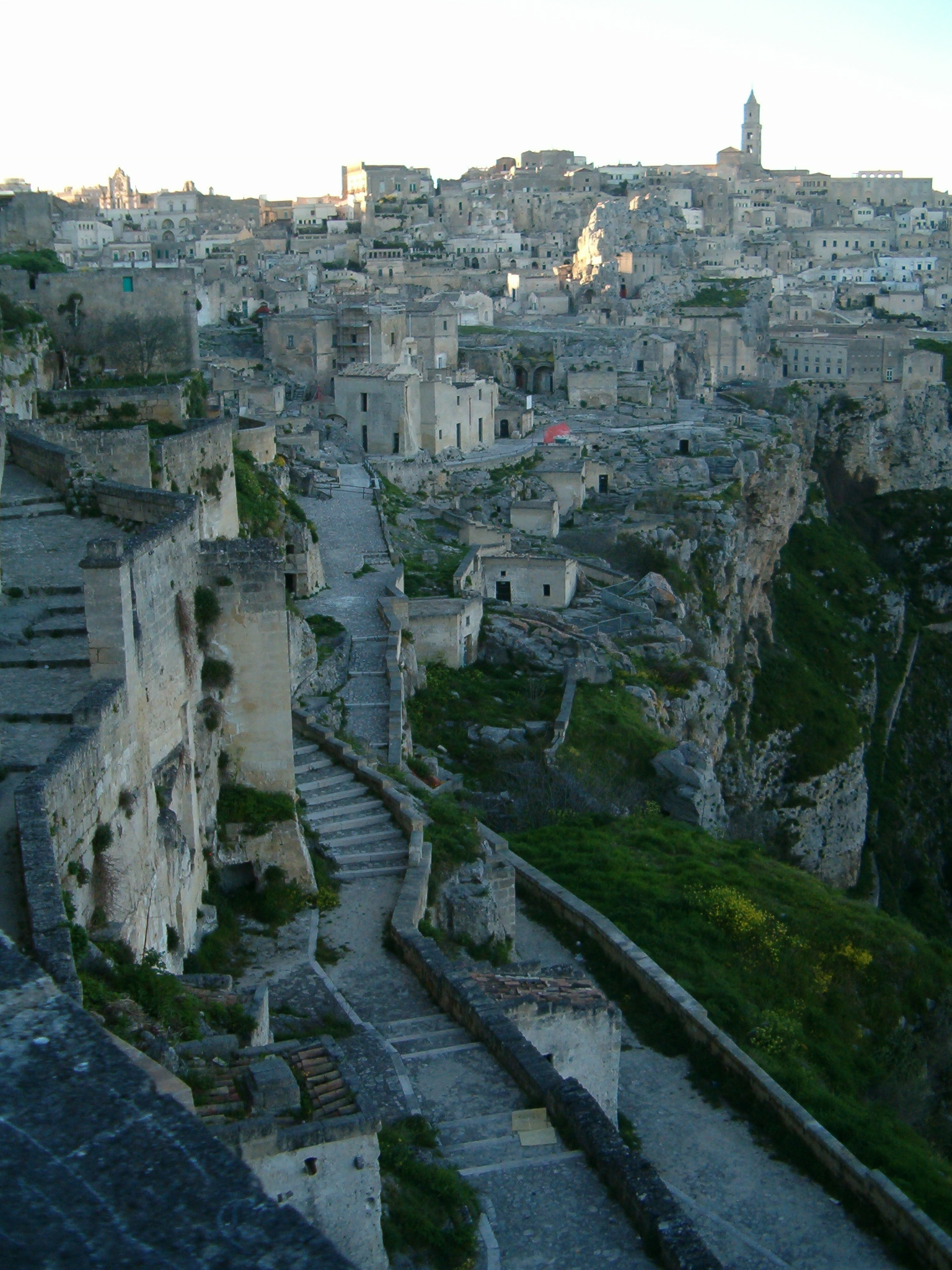
View from the hills

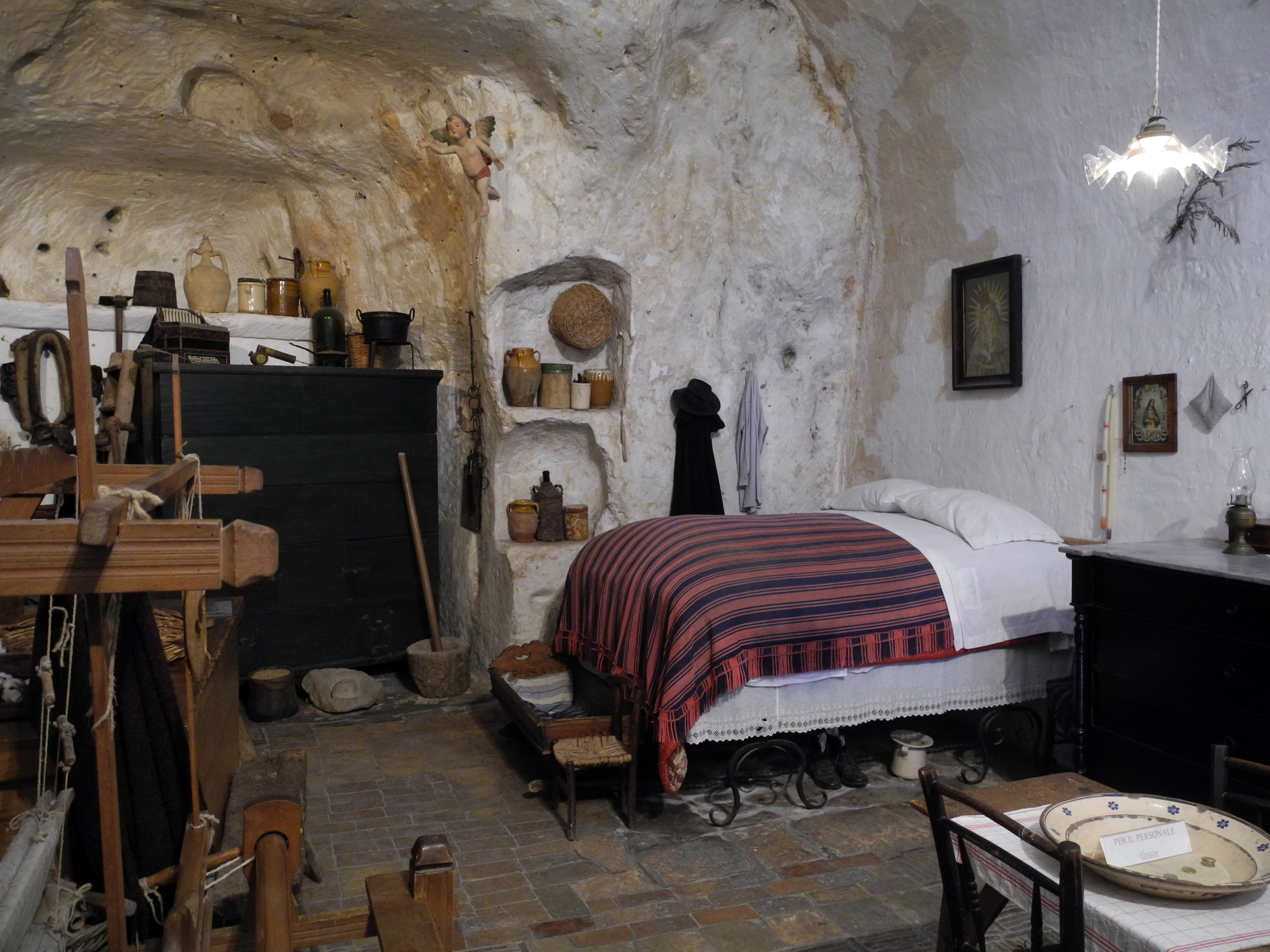
Interior of a cave house

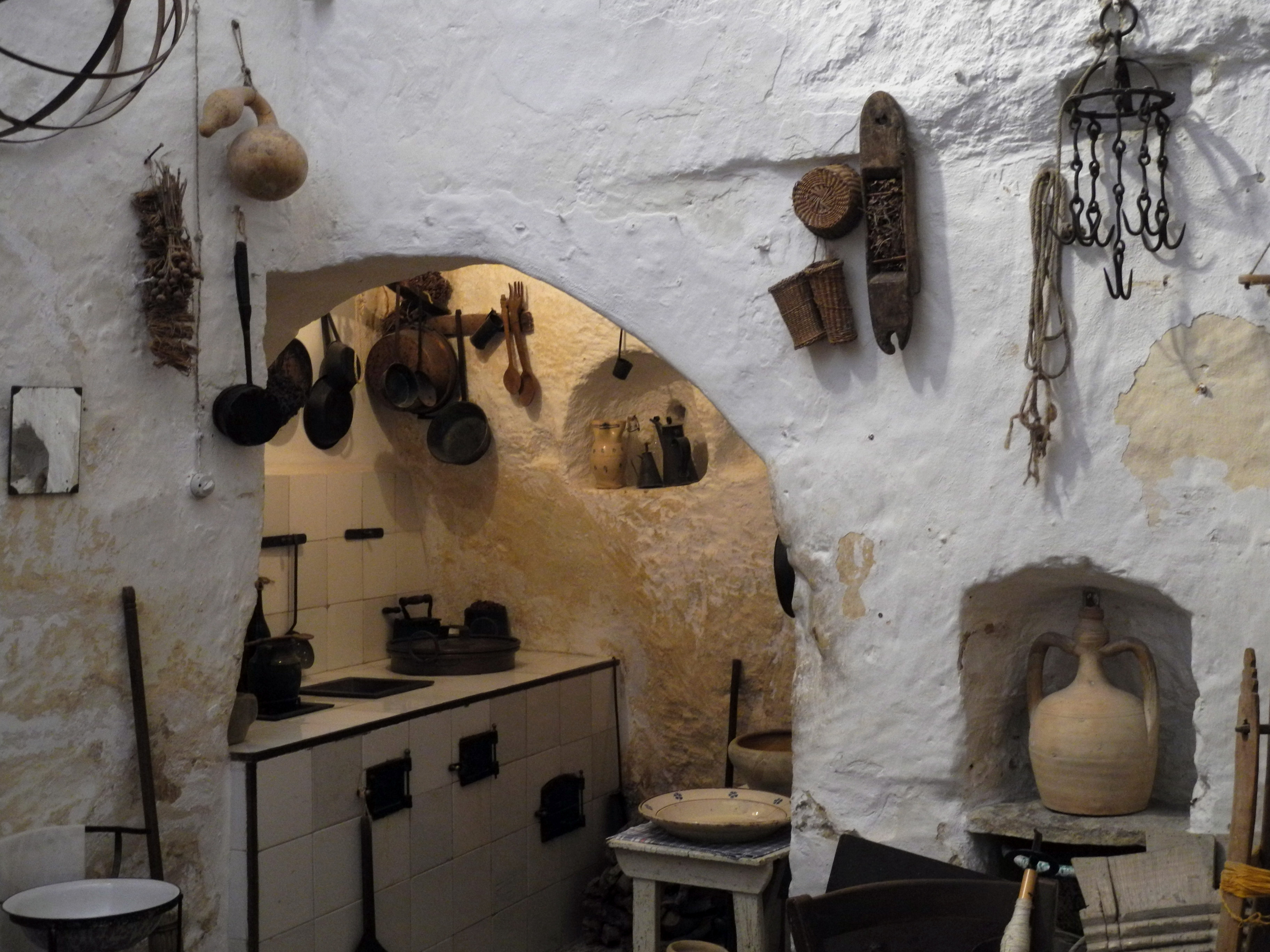

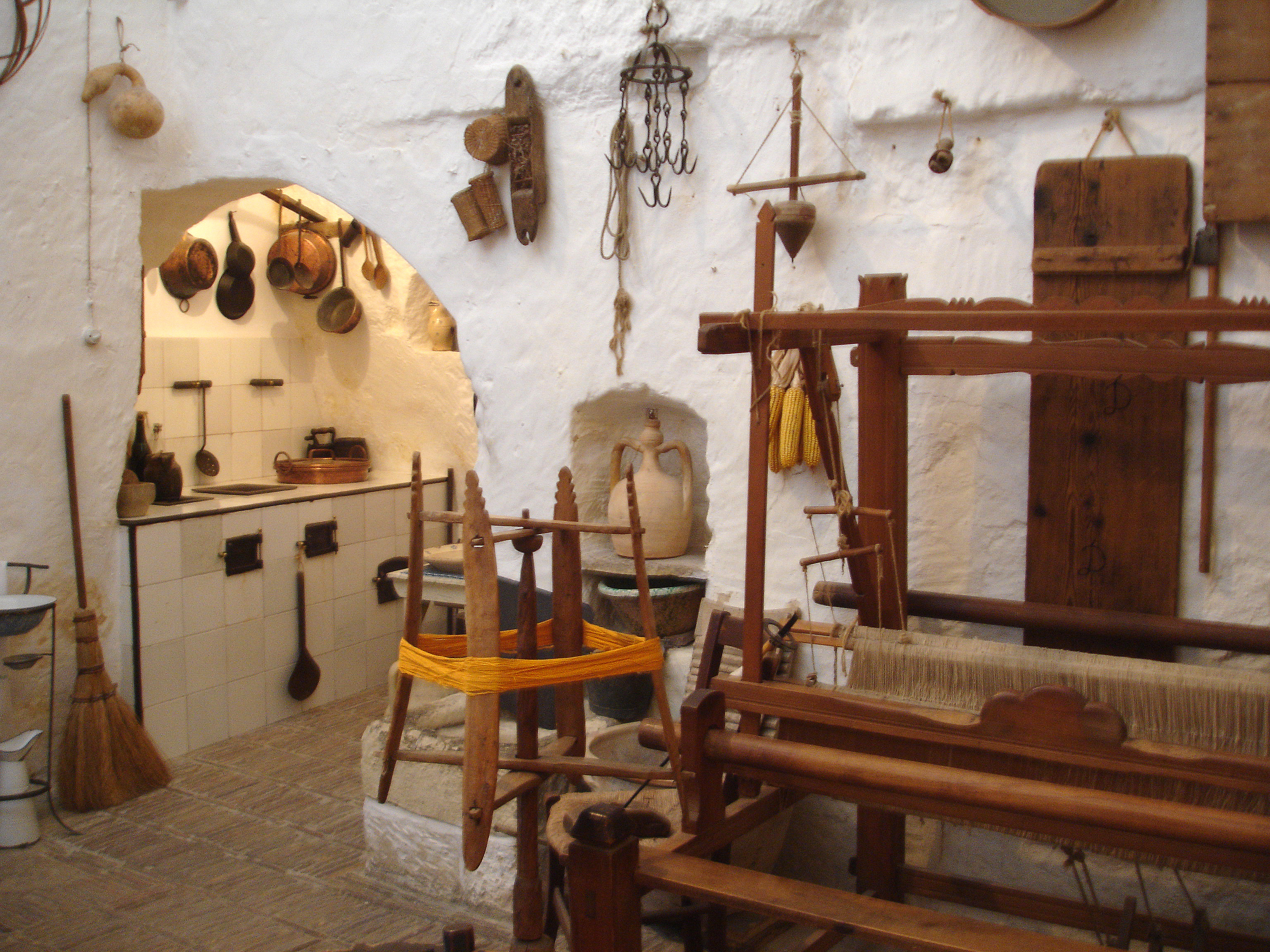

== See also ==
- Murgia
- Falco naumanni
- Museo-laboratorio della Civiltà Contadina (Museum-workshop of the Peasant Culture)
