= Lago di Acerenza =

Lake in Italy

- Location within Italy
- Location: Province of Potenza, Basilicata
- Coordinates: 40°46′23″N 15°55′10″E
- Primary inflows: Bradano, torrente Rosso
- Primary outflows: Bradano
- Basin countries: Italy
- Surface area: 2 km^{2} (0.77 sq mi)
- Surface elevation: 455 m (1,493 ft)

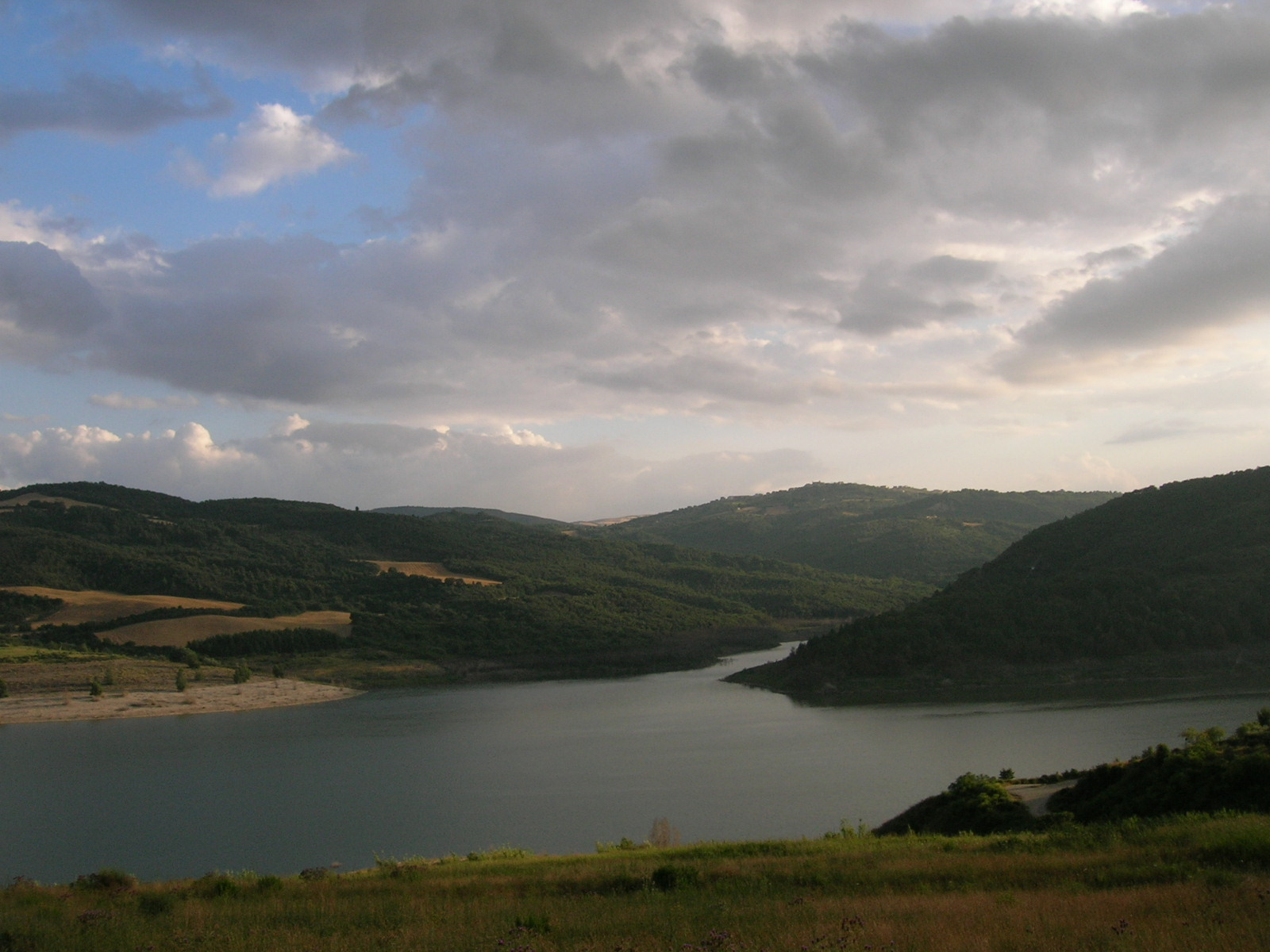
Lago di Acerenza

Lake Acerenza or Lago di Acerenza is a lake in the Province of Potenza, Basilicata, Italy. It was created in 1984 after the construction of the dam that blocked the course of the Bradano river. At an elevation of 455 m, its surface area is 2 km^{2}. The lake has rich variety of fish species.
