= Alvo (river) =

Location
- Country: Italy

Physical characteristics
- Source
  - location: near Pietragalla and Vaglio Basilicata
- Mouth: Bradano
  - coordinates: 40.7347°N 16.1882°E

Basin features
- Progression: Bradano→ Gulf of Taranto

The Alvo is a river in the Basilicata region of southern Italy. The source of the river is located in the province of Potenza between Pietragalla and Vaglio Basilicata. It flows north near Pietragalla and curves eastward north of Cancellara and south of the Bradano. The river then flows southeast near Oppido Lucano, Tolve, and San Chirico Nuovo before curving northeast. It then crosses the border into the province of Matera and joins the Bradano west of Irsina.
