= Basentello =

Location
- Country: Italy

Physical characteristics
- Source
  - location: near Palazzo San Gervasio
  - elevation: 397 m (1,302 ft)
- Mouth: Bradano
  - coordinates: 40.6695°N 16.3822°E
- Length: 58 km (36 mi)

Basin features
- Progression: Bradano→ Gulf of Taranto

The Basentello is a river that flows near the border between the Apulia and Basilicata regions of southern Italy. Its source is near Palazzo San Gervasio. The river flows southeast and forms part of the border between the province of Potenza and the province of Barletta-Andria-Trani. It flows into the province of Potenza before entering Lago di Serra del Corvo. After flowing out of the lake, the river flows into the province of Matera near the border with the province of Bari. Finally, the river enters the Bradano as a left tributary shortly before the Bradano enters Lago di San Giuliano (a short distance before the Bilioso does the same).
