= Lago di Serra del Corvo =

Lake in Basilicata, Italy

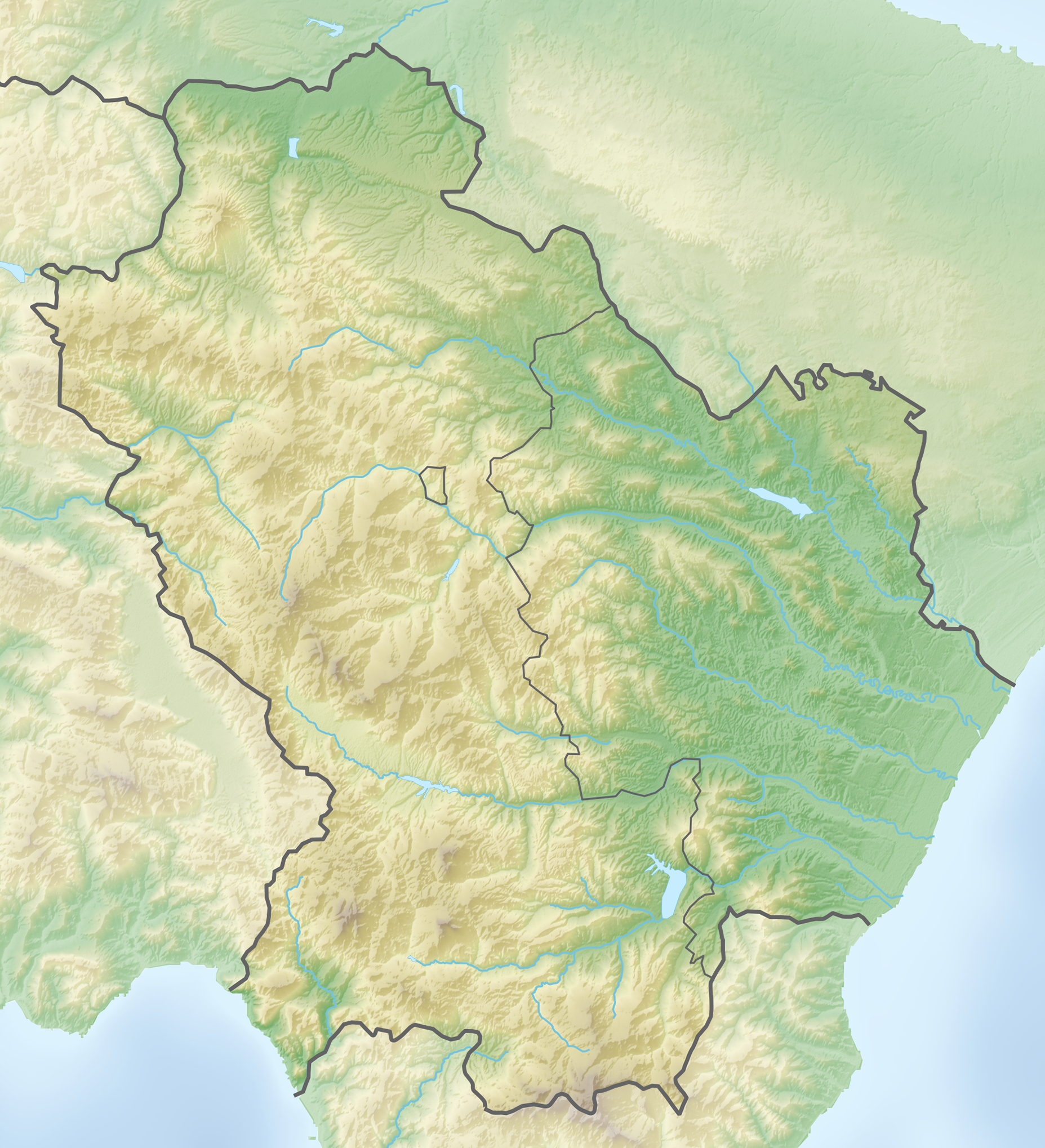
- Location within Basilicata
- Location: Province of Potenza
- Coordinates: 40°51′07″N 16°14′10″E
- Primary inflows: Basentello
- Primary outflows: Basentello
- Basin countries: Italy

Lago di Serra del Corvo is a lake in the Basilicata region of southern Italy. The lake is located in Genzano di Lucania (province of Potenza) on the border with the province of Bari and just north of the province of Matera. The Basentello flows into the lake from the northwest and flows out of it to the southeast.
