= Museum-workshop of the Peasant Culture =

- Museo-laboratorio della Civiltà Contadina
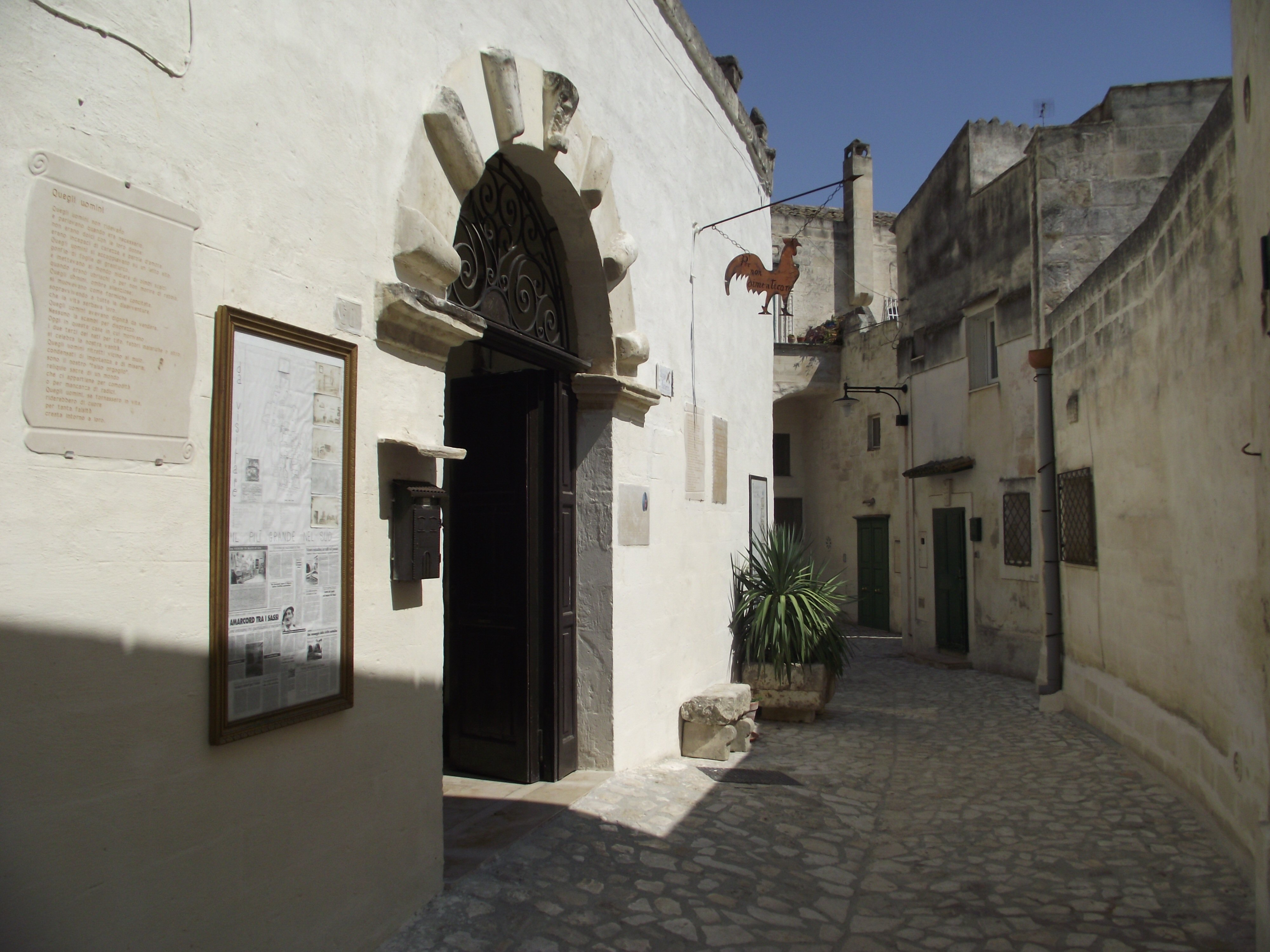
- Entry of palazzo Barberis, house of the museum

- Location within Italy
- Established: 1998
- Location: Via San Giovanni Vecchio, 60; 75100 Matera, Italy
- Coordinates: 40.667576°N 16.609927°E
- Type: ethno-anthropological
- Founders: Donato Cascione, Barbara Eramo
- Director: Donato Cascione
- Website: museolaboratorio.it

The Museum-workshop of the Peasant Culture (Museo-laboratorio della Civiltà Contadina) is an ethno-anthropological museum in Matera, situated in the ancient Sassi district. It was founded by Donato Cascione and is managed by the homonym cultural association.

== Structure ==
The museum currently covers an area of 500 m^{2}: in its definitive layout the current surface will be doubled and it will be completed with the workshops, where young people can learn the ancient trades (cartapestaio, potter, basket-maker, etc.).

The museum is composed by several residences, connected for exhibition purpose. The first environment reproduces a "lamione", a built ambient (16th century) that extends the volume of a pre-existing cave (house cave): it allowed the family to separate from the beasts during the night.

The Sassi population was constituted for the 70% by peasants; the remaining 30% were artisans that carried out innumerable handicraft activities aimed to satisfy the local demand. Commercial exchanges, in fact, were very limited for the lack of suitable infrastructures. Most of the exhibition rooms are dedicated to these artisans’ shops that once existed in the ancient town. Furthermore, there are exhibition rooms representing daily-life places, typical of this agricultural-pastoral society (public wine cellars), and testimonies related to themes connected to the South-Italy history (brigandage, childhood).

== Outfitting ==
The preparation of the exhibition halls has been preceded by years of targeted gathering of daily use objects and tools from various jobs that were the foundation of the economic and social life in the Sassi town.
A fundamental criterion has inspired the setting out of the environments: the museum didn’t have to be a cold exposition of objects but a reconstruction of environments as close as possible to reality.
The operational phase of the preparation, has been preceded by the study of the most meaningful texts of the "peasant literature", and it has been supported by the enthusiastic consultation of seniors, which lived this history themselves and whose testimony is full of details from personal experience.

== Exhibition itinerary ==
=== Map ===
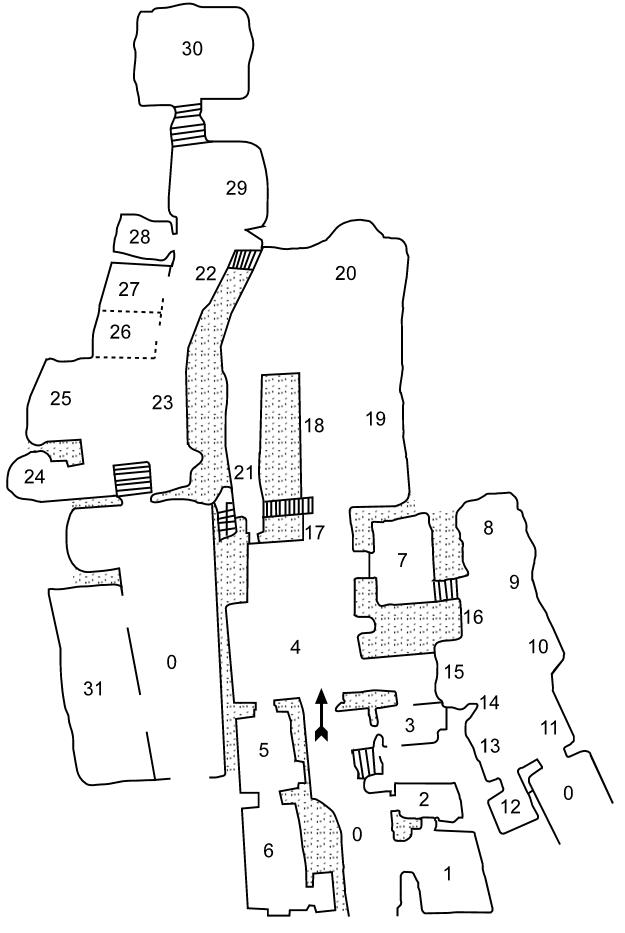
Map of the Museo-laboratorio della Civiltà Contadina (Museum-workshop of the Peasant Culture) of Matera

- External courtyard (0)
- Priest's room (1)
- Sieve-maker (2)
- Entry (→)
- Washrooms (3)
- Typical house (4)
- Weaving room (5)
- Direction (6)
- Utensils to sift, grind and store the cereals (7)
- Tanner (8)
- Wheat case with volume measures (9)
- Shepherd (10)
- Basket-maker (11)
- The short childhood (12)
- Cavamonti's tools (13)
- Shoe shiner’s chair (14)
- Barber (15)
- Brigandage showcase (16)
- Carver's bench (17)
- Cabinet-maker (18)
- Mastro d’ascia (19)
- Blacksmith (20)
- Tailor (21)
- Conciapiatti (22)
- Potter (23)
- Knife-grinder (24)
- Public wine cellar (ciddaro) (25)
- Saddler (26)
- Coppersmith (27)
- Cobbler (28)
- Agricultural tools (29)
- Scalpellino (30)
- Lunch area (31)

== Activities ==
Currently the association is working on the fruition, that have to be guaranteed at different levels: from the simple tourist visit to didactic itineraries for students of every order and degree.
There are different cultural activities that the Association carries out in its territory, always finalized to the involvement of the youth (team works, production of didactic material, dramatizations, publications of testimonies, etc.).

=== Workshop ===
Recently a first artistic workshop has been activated, finalized to different expressive activities: production of graphic-pictorial material, ceramics decoration, clay and wood working.
The artifacts are reproductions of objects connected to the life in the Sassi, as well as representations of life-situations typical of the agricultural-pastoral society. The workshop allows the organization of innumerable didactic activities that involve students of schools of every order and degree.

=== Publications ===
The association collected the result of its own ethnographical researches (testimonies, photos, documents) in a publication, "Tales from the Museum", now to its third edition.
The association also produced a CD-ROM that allows the virtual tour of the exhibition halls, a booklet about the water-harvesting systems in Matera from Neolithic to the first half of the 20th century, and a guidebook to the Museum.

== See also ==
- Matera
- Sassi di Matera
