= Gravina di Matera =

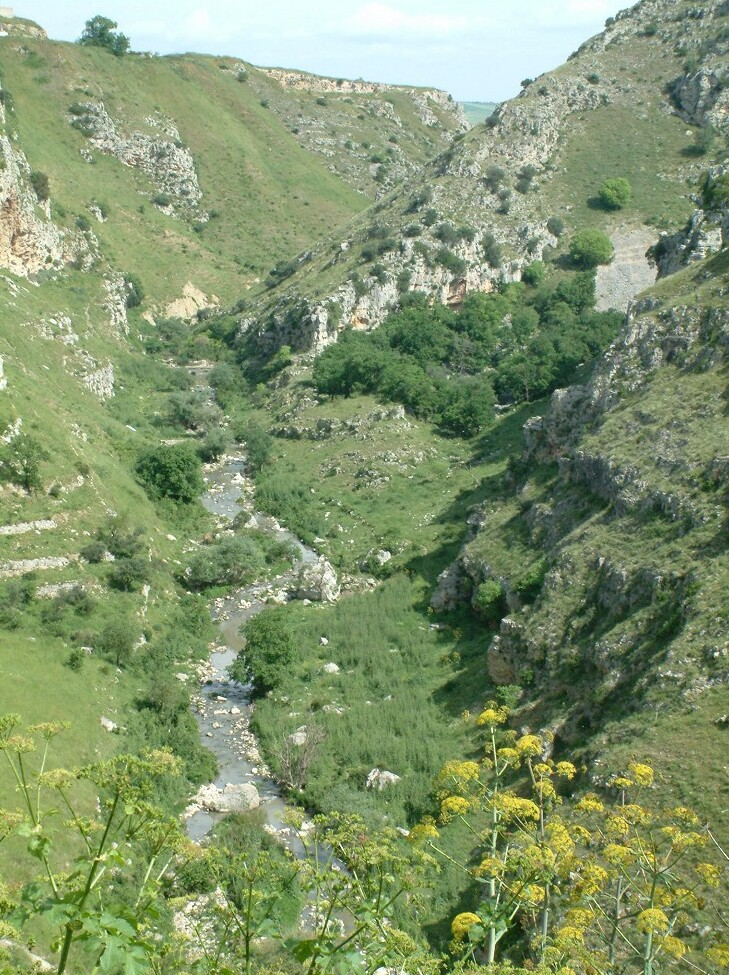

Location
- Country: Italy

Physical characteristics
- Source
  - location: between Altamura and Gravina in Puglia
- Mouth: Bradano
  - coordinates: 40.4838°N 16.7359°E

Basin features
- Progression: Bradano→ Gulf of Taranto

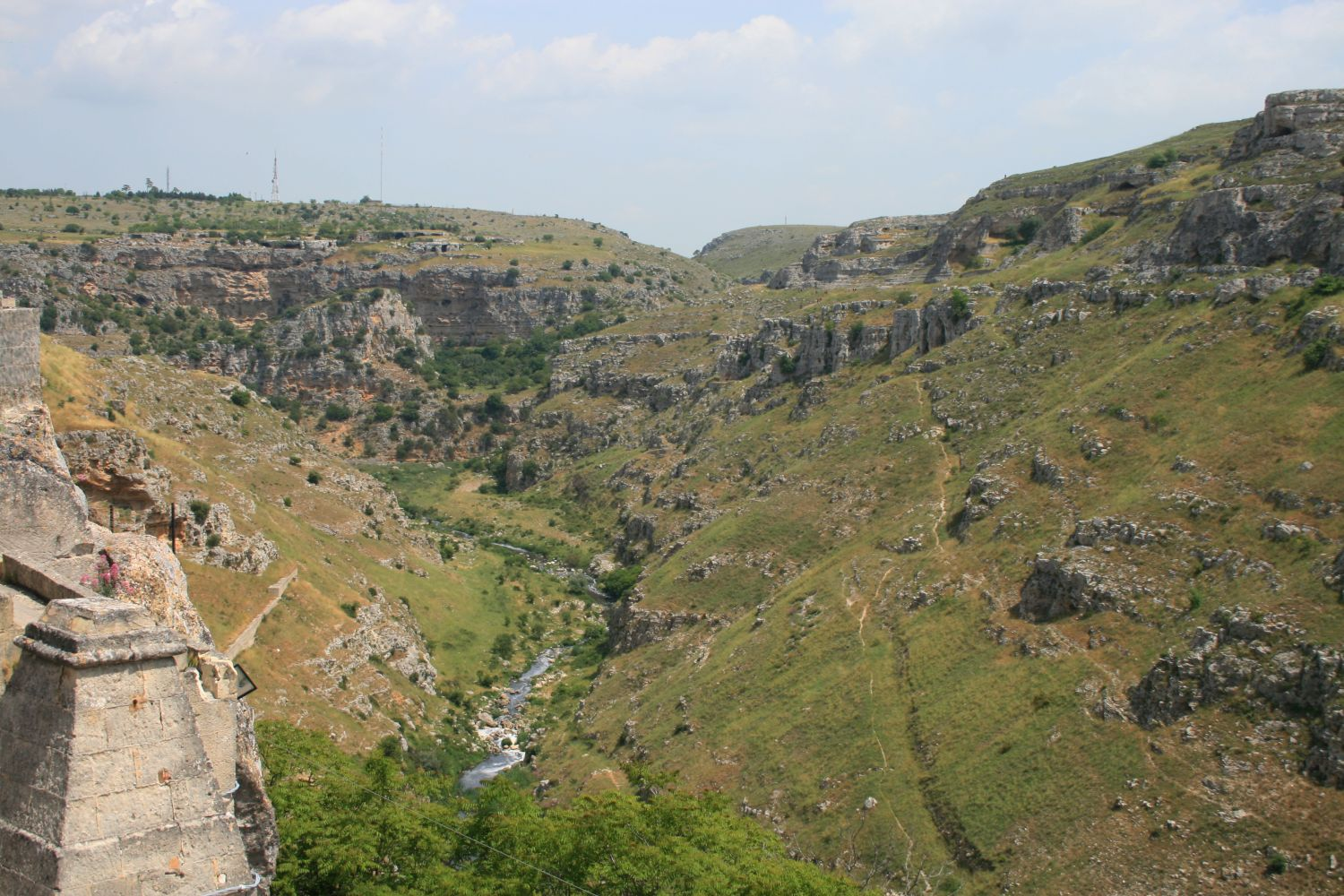
Gravina di Matera

The Gravina di Matera is a river in the Apulia and Basilicata regions of southern Italy. Its source is between Altamura and Gravina in Puglia in the province of Bari. The river flows southeast and curves east before again flowing southeast. It then flows into the province of Matera and is joined by a left tributary at Matera. The river forms the border between the province of Matera and the province of Taranto near Montescaglioso and Ginosa. Finally, it joins the Bradano as a left tributary in the province of Taranto.
