= Gravina (river) =

Gravina Gravina di Picciano
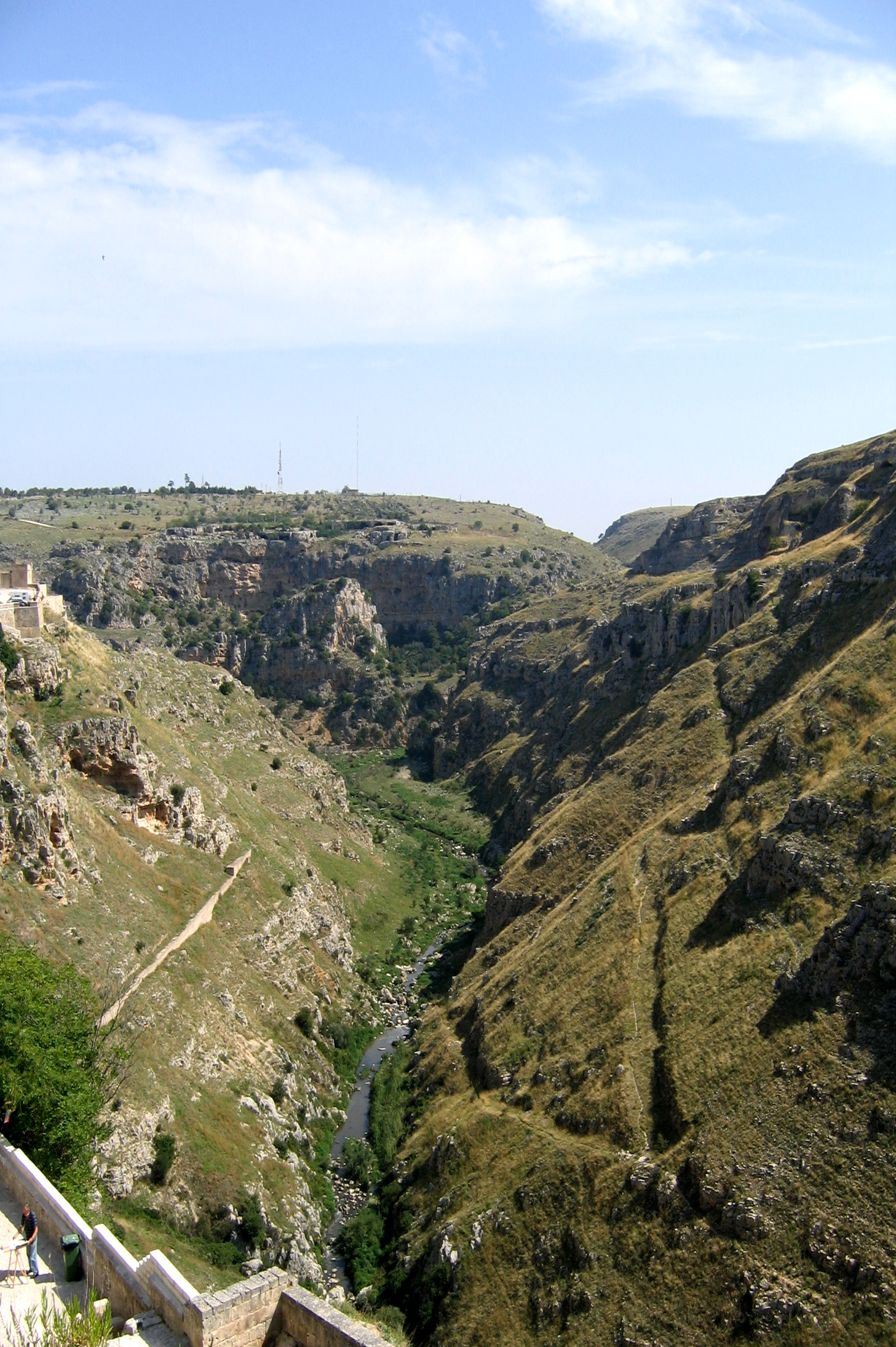

Location
- Country: Italy

Physical characteristics
- Source
  - location: near Poggiorsini
- Mouth: Bradano
  - coordinates: 40.5980°N 16.5721°E

Basin features
- Progression: Bradano→ Gulf of Taranto

The Gravina (also called Gravina di Picciano) is a river in the Apulia and Basilicata regions of southern Italy. Its source is near Poggiorsini and the border of the province of Barletta-Andria-Trani in the province of Bari. The river flows southeast near Gravina in Puglia before crossing into the province of Matera. It flows west of Matera before emptying into the Bradano as a left tributary a short distance after the Bradano exits Lago di San Giuliano.
