= Lago di San Giuliano =

Lake in Basilicata, Italy

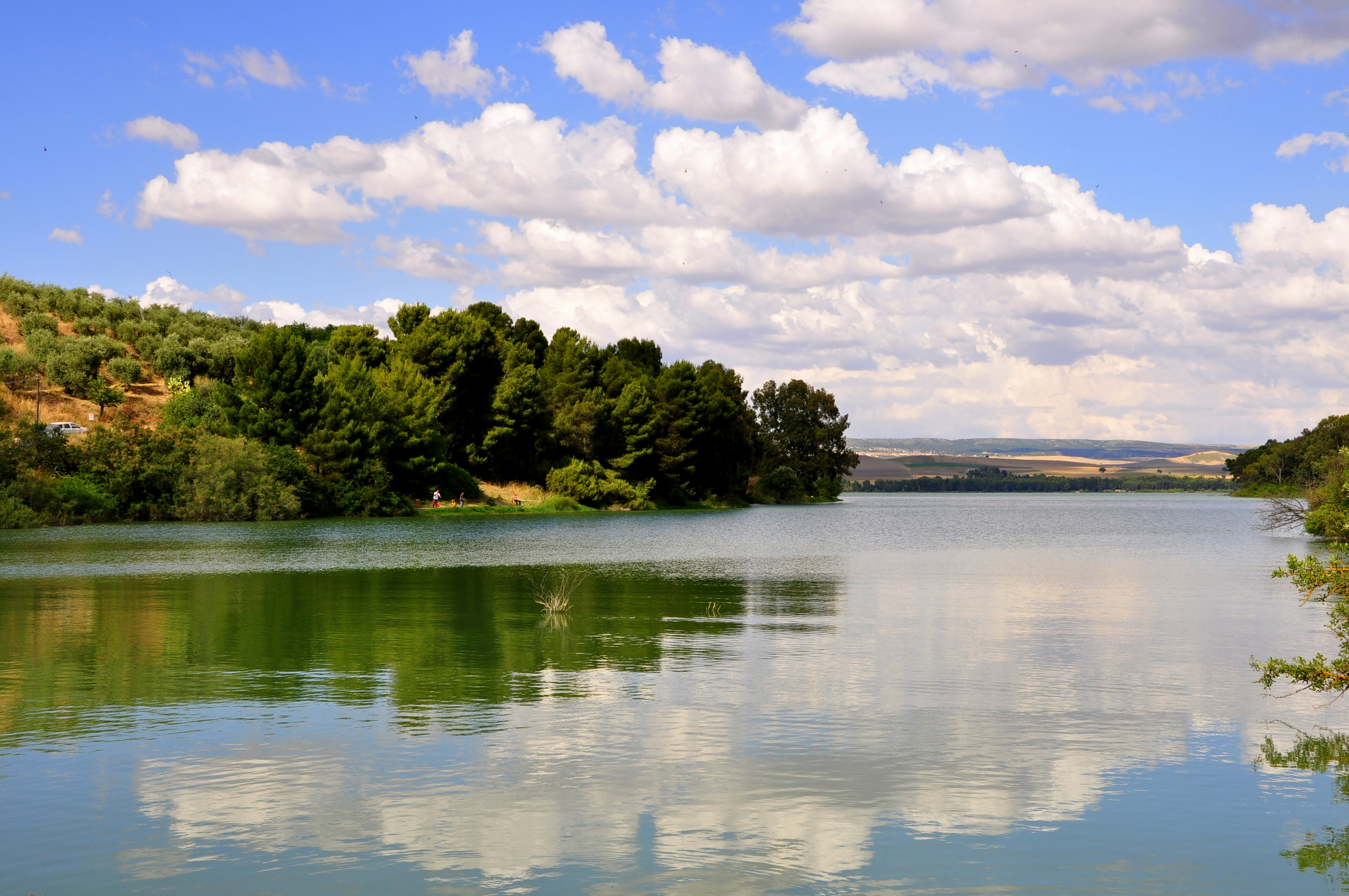

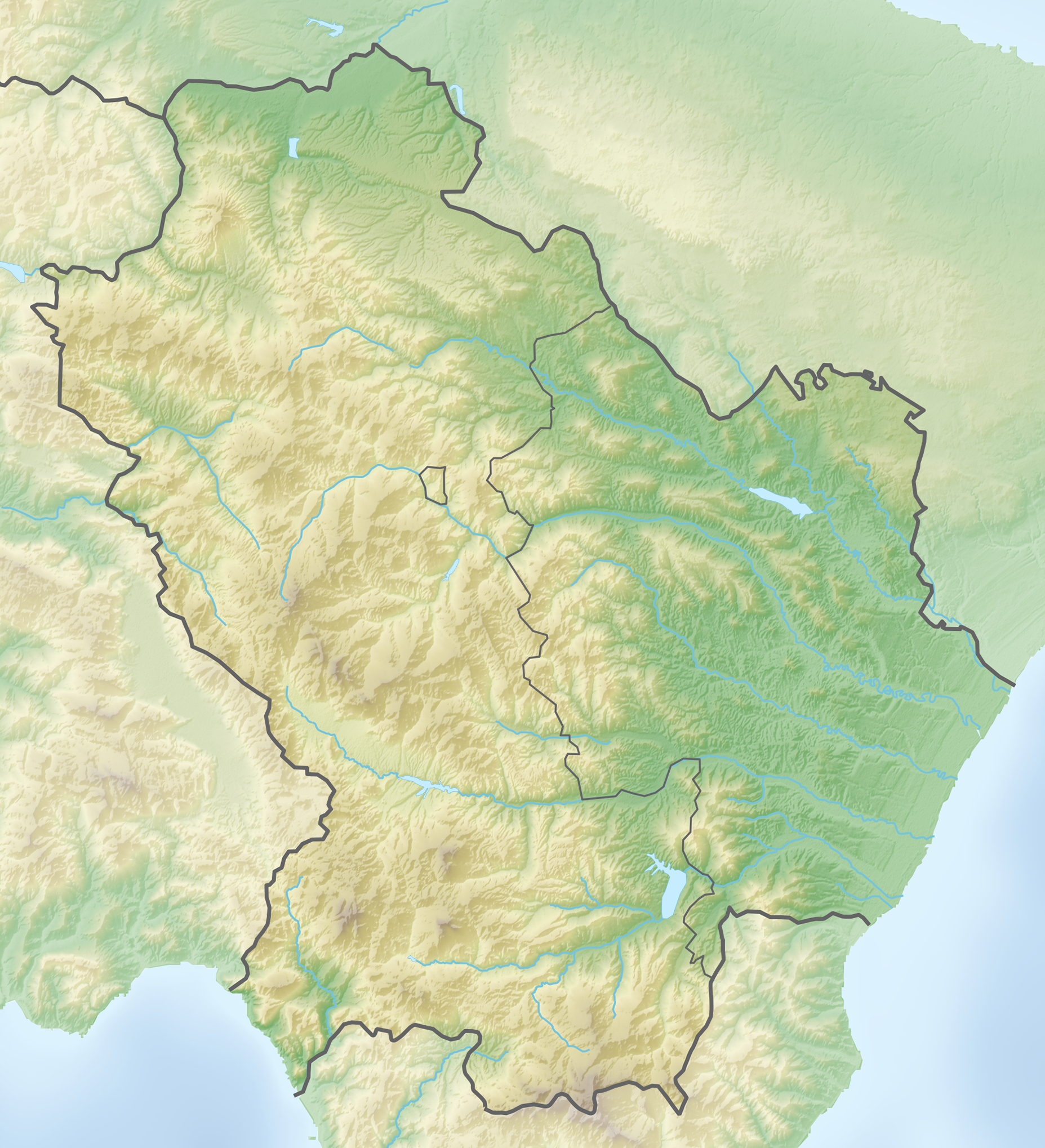
- Location within Basilicata
- Location: Province of Matera
- Coordinates: 40.614°N 16.497°E
- Primary inflows: Bradano
- Primary outflows: Bradano
- Basin countries: Italy

Ramsar Wetland
- Designated: 13 December 2006
- Reference no.: 1663

Lago di San Giuliano is a lake in the Basilicata region of southern Italy. The lake is located entirely within the province of Matera. It is southwest of Matera, east of Grottole, and north of Miglionico. The Bradano flows into the lake from the northwest and flows out of the lake to the southeast.
