= Bradano =

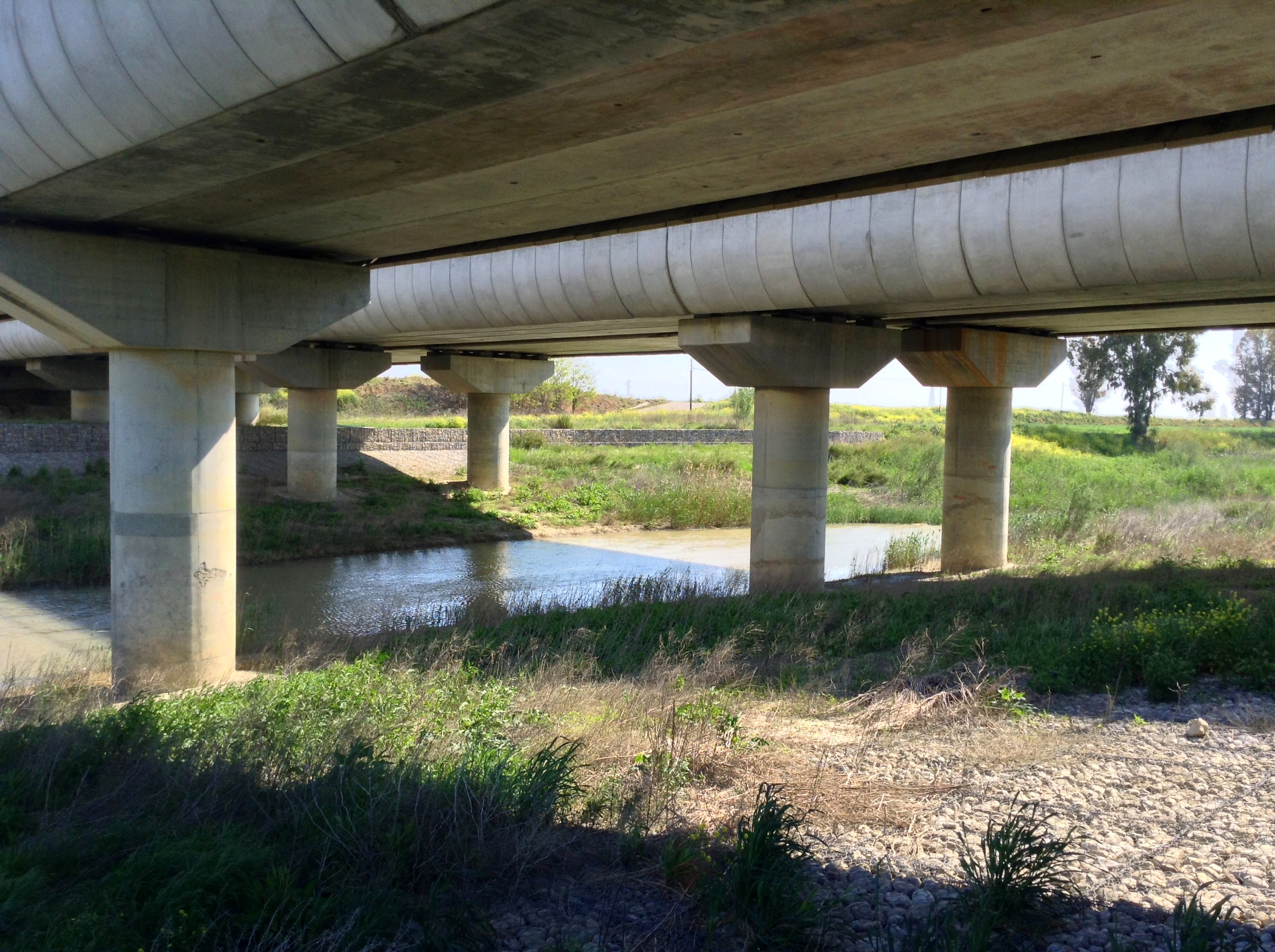

Location
- Country: Basilicata, Italy

Physical characteristics
- Source
  - location: Lago Pesole
  - elevation: 938 m (3,077 ft)
- Mouth: Gulf of Taranto
  - coordinates: 40.3873°N 16.8587°E
- Length: 120 km (75 mi)
- Basin size: 2,765 km^{2} (1,068 sq mi)
- Discharge
  - average: 7 m^{3}/s (250 cu ft/s)

The Bradano is a river in the Basilicata and Apulia regions of southern Italy. Its source is Lago Pesole (which is near Forenza and Filiano) in the province of Potenza. The river flows southeast near Monte Torretta, Acerenza, and Oppido Lucano. After crossing into the province of Matera, it is joined by a right tributary, the Alvo. The river flows near Irsina before being joined by a left tributary, the Basentello. Shortly after that, it is joined by another right tributary, the Bilioso. The river then enters Lago di San Giuliano. After flowing out of the lake, the Bradano is joined by a left tributary, the Gravina, and flows southeast near Montescaglioso before entering the province of Taranto. It is then joined by a left tributary, the Gravina di Matera, before re-entering the province of Matera after a short distance. The river flows near the border with the province of Taranto before entering the Gulf of Taranto near Lido di Metaponto.
