= San Chirico Nuovo =

- Comune
- Comune di San Chirico Nuovo
- Location within Italy Location within Basilicata
- Coordinates: 40°41′N 16°5′E
- Country: Italy
- Region: Basilicata
- Province: Potenza (PZ)

Government
  - Mayor: Rosa Baldassarre

Area
  - Total: 23.39 km^{2} (9.03 sq mi)
- Elevation: 745 m (2,444 ft)

Population (31 December 2018)
  - Total: 1,294
  - Density: 55.32/km^{2} (143.3/sq mi)
- Demonym: Sanchirichesi
- Time zone: UTC+1 (CET)
  - Summer (DST): UTC+2 (CEST)
- Postal code: 85010
- Dialing code: 0971
- ISTAT code: 076073
- Patron saint: St. Roch
- Saint day: 22 August
- Website: Official website

San Chirico Nuovo is an Arbëreshë town and comune in the province of Potenza, in the southern Italian region of Basilicata. It was founded by Albanian settlerswith the blessing of the prince of Tolve. It is about 25 km northeast of Potenza, the provincial capital. Its population has been around 1,200 to 1,300 in recent years, with a general trend of decline.
