= Lodi, Lombardy =

Lodi Lòd (Lombard)
- Comune
- Comune di Lodi
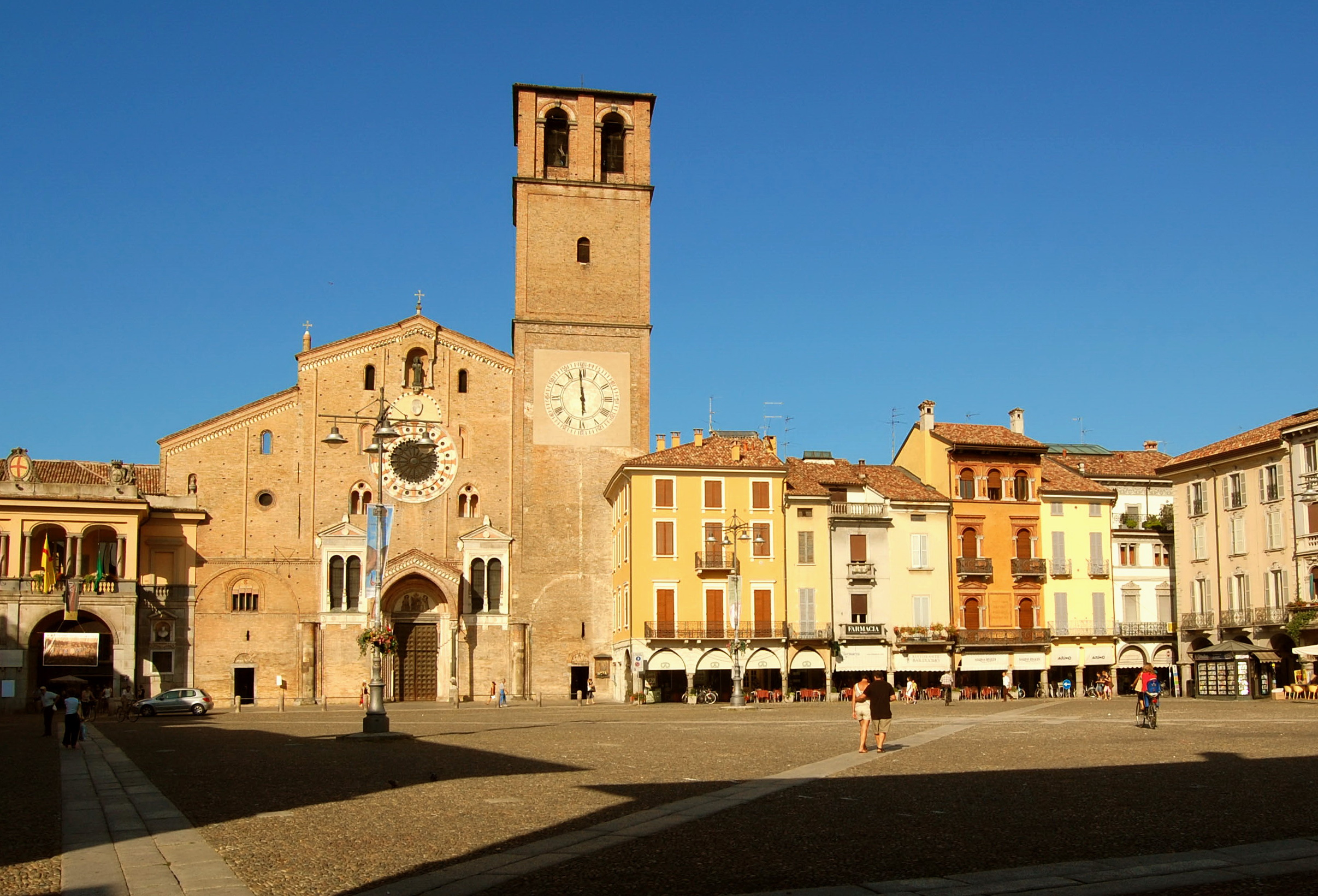
- Piazza della Vittoria

- Flag Coat of arms

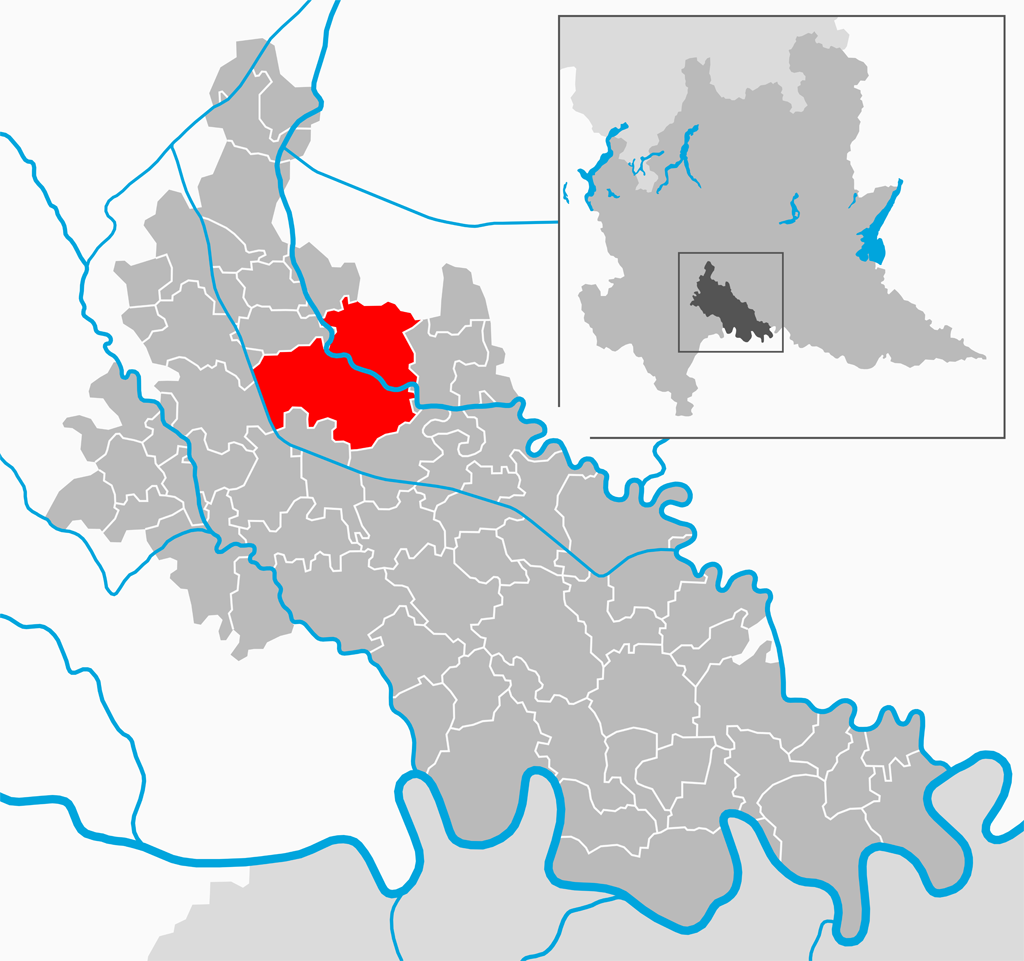

- Location within Italy Location within Lombardy
- Coordinates: 45°19′N 9°30′E
- Country: Italy
- Region: Lombardy
- Province: Lodi (LO)
- Frazioni: Fontana, Olmo, Riolo, San Grato

Government
  - Mayor: Andrea Furegato (Democratic Party)

Area
  - Total: 41.38 km^{2} (15.98 sq mi)
- Elevation: 87 m (285 ft)

Population (2026)
  - Total: 45,643
  - Density: 1,103/km^{2} (2,857/sq mi)
- Demonym: Lodigiani or Laudensi
- Time zone: UTC+1 (CET)
  - Summer (DST): UTC+2 (CEST)
- Postal code: 26900
- Dialing code: 0371
- Patron saint: St. Bassianus
- Saint day: 19 January
- Website: Official website
Additional information
- Neighboring municipalities: Boffalora d'Adda, Cornegliano Laudense, Corte Palasio, Dovera, Lodi Vecchio, Montanaso Lombardo, Pieve Fissiraga, San Martino in Strada, Tavazzano con Villavesco
- Seismic classification: Zone 3 (low seismicity)
- Climate classification: Zone E, 2,592 DD

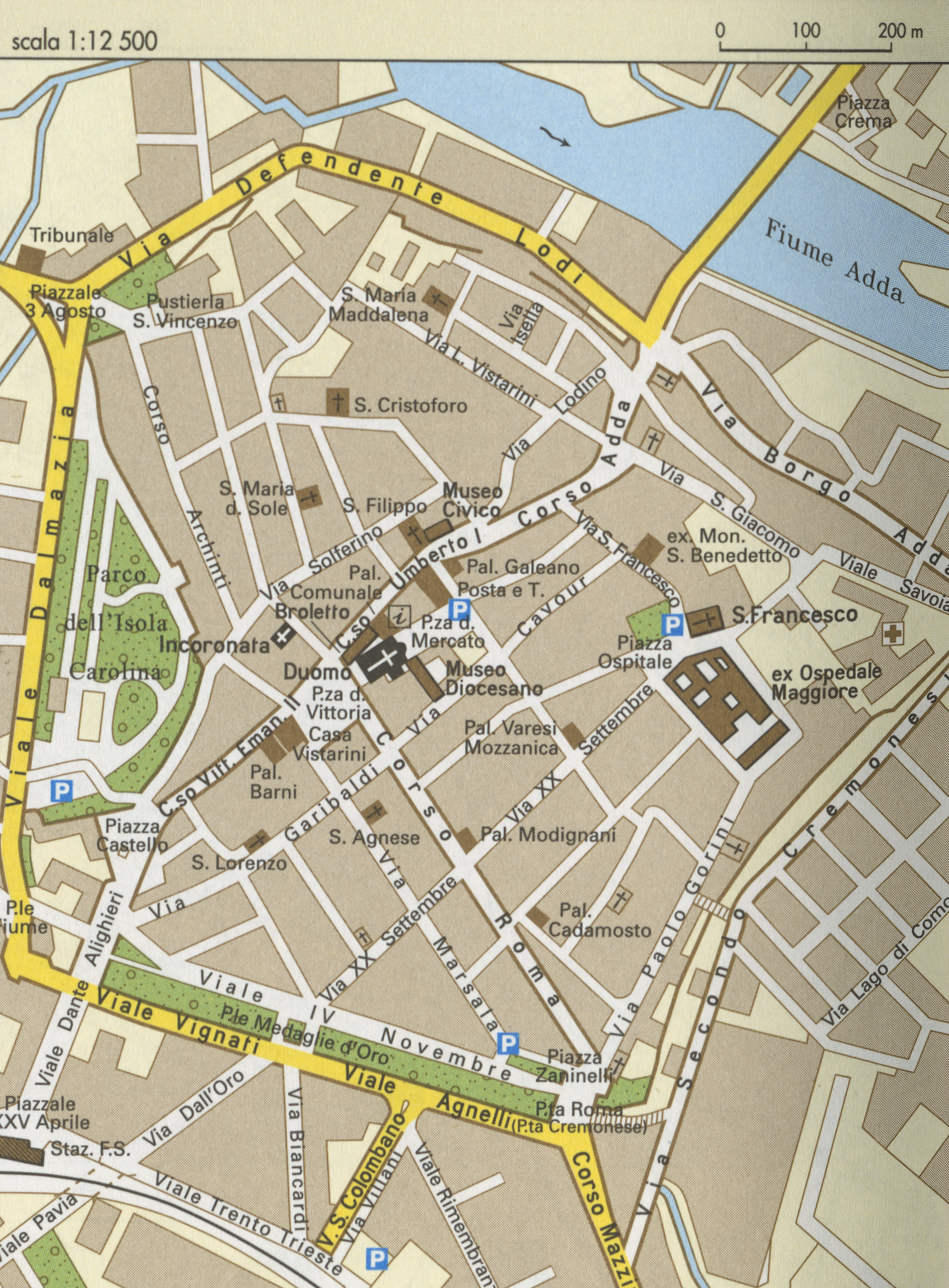
Map of historical centre

Lodi (/ˈloʊdi/ LOH-dee, Italian: [ˈlɔːdi]; Ludesan: Lòd) is a city and comune (municipality), the capital of the province of the same name in the region of Lombardy in Italy. With a population of 45,643, it is the 21st-largest city in Lombardy.

The city was founded on 3 August 1158 by Frederick Barbarossa, following the destruction of the ancient village of Laus Pompeia, a former Roman municipium, episcopal see, and free commune. During the Renaissance, Lodi experienced a period of significant artistic and cultural splendor, notably after hosting the signing of the historic treaty between the pre-unification Italian states, known as the Treaty of Lodi, in 1454.

In the 21st century, Lodi has become a major industrial hub for cosmetics, crafts, and cheese production. It also serves as a reference point for a region primarily dedicated to agriculture and livestock farming; due to this characteristic, Lodi was chosen as the location for the faculty of veterinary medicine at the University of Milan and the Parco Tecnologico Padano, one of the most qualified research institutes in Europe in the field of agri-food biotechnology.

The city also has a well-developed tertiary sector and tourism industry: Lodi is recognized as one of the art cities of the Po Valley and is notable for several important monuments, including the Cathedral, the Civic Temple of the Crowned Virgin, the Church of San Francesco, the Church of Sant'Agnese, and Palazzo Mozzanica.

== History ==
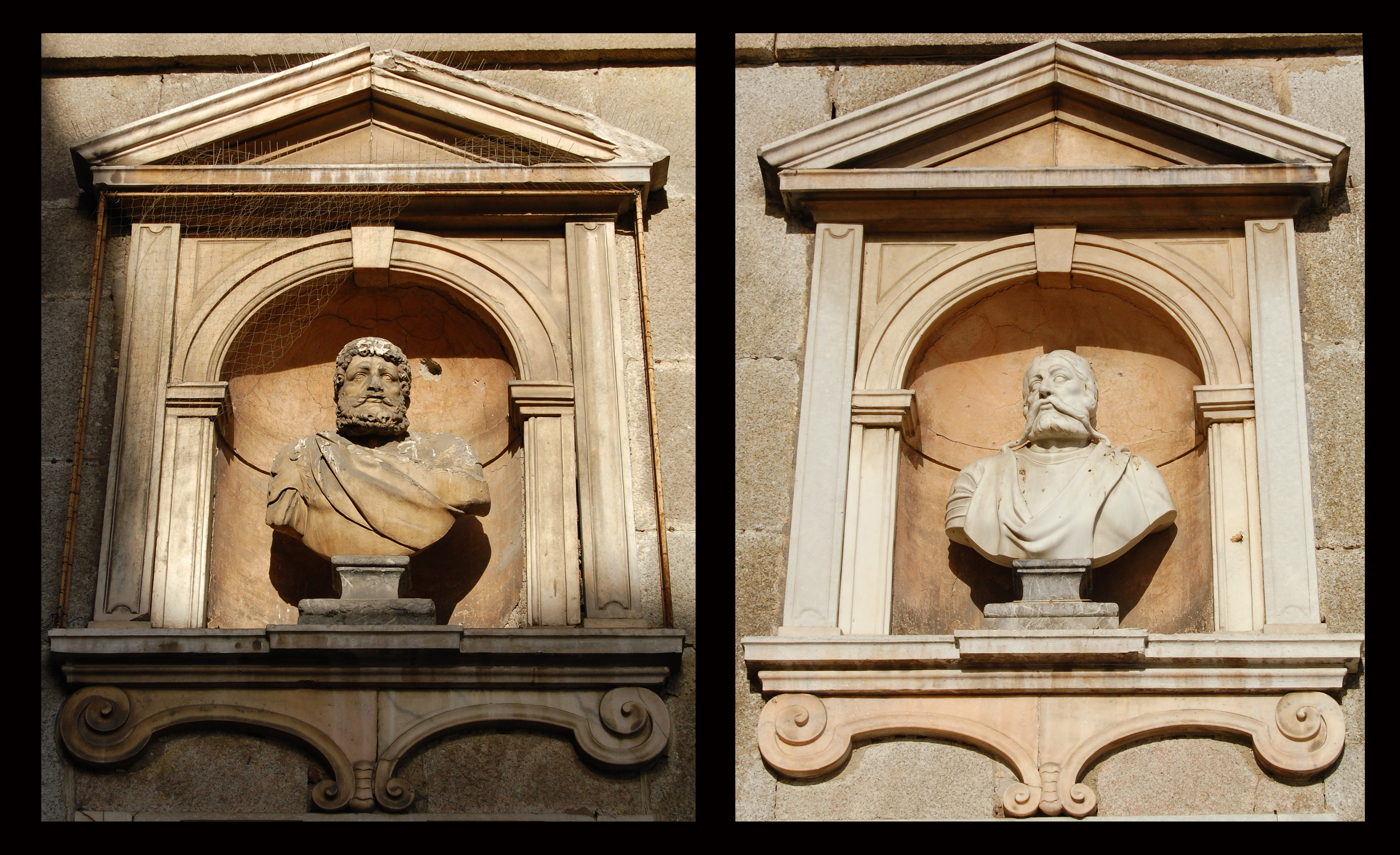
Marble busts placed on either side of the municipal palace, depicting the two "founding fathers" of the city: on the left Gnaeus Pompeius Strabo, on the right Frederick Barbarossa

Lodi traces its origins to the destruction of Laus Pompeia, an ancient village of the Boii and later a Roman municipium, renamed in 89 BC in honor of the consul Gnaeus Pompeius Strabo. Located at the confluence of the roads from Placentia (Piacenza) and Acerrae (Pizzighettone) to Mediolanum (Milan), and at the intersection with the road from Ticinum (Pavia) to Brixia (Brescia), Laus was a key hub and became a thriving commercial and agricultural village. After coming under the control of the Lombards (6th–8th centuries) and later the Franks (8th–9th centuries), on 24 May 1111, Laus Pompeia was razed by the Milanese following a period of siege. The peace agreements prohibited the reconstruction of the destroyed buildings.

Nearly fifty years later, on 3 August 1158, the city was refounded by Emperor Frederick Barbarossa not on the ruins of Laus Pompeia (now Lodi Vecchio) but along the banks of the Adda, to ensure a more strategic position for territorial control. The emperor granted Lodi extraordinary privileges, despite which the city grew with difficulty: in 1167, it was forced by the Milanese to join the Lombard League and participate in the Battle of Legnano in 1176.

In the 13th century, Lodi continued to develop under the protection of Frederick II. From 1251, the city saw a succession of lordships under the Vistarini, Torriani, Visconti, Fissiraga, and Vignati, until in the 14th century, the County of Lodi became dependent on the Duchy of Milan, initially under the Visconti, who built the imposing Castle of Porta Regale (1355–1370), and later under the Sforza, who, under Francesco Sforza, expanded and strengthened the defensive system by constructing two fortifications at the ends of the Adda bridge.

During the Renaissance, significant historical events took place in Lodi: in 1413, Antipope John XXIII and Emperor Sigismund convened the Council of Constance from the Lodi Cathedral, which later resolved the Western Schism. On 9 April 1454, the pre-unification Italian states signed the Treaty of Lodi, which ensured forty years of political stability. This also marked one of the happiest periods in Lodi’s history from a cultural perspective, particularly under the episcopate of Carlo Pallavicino.

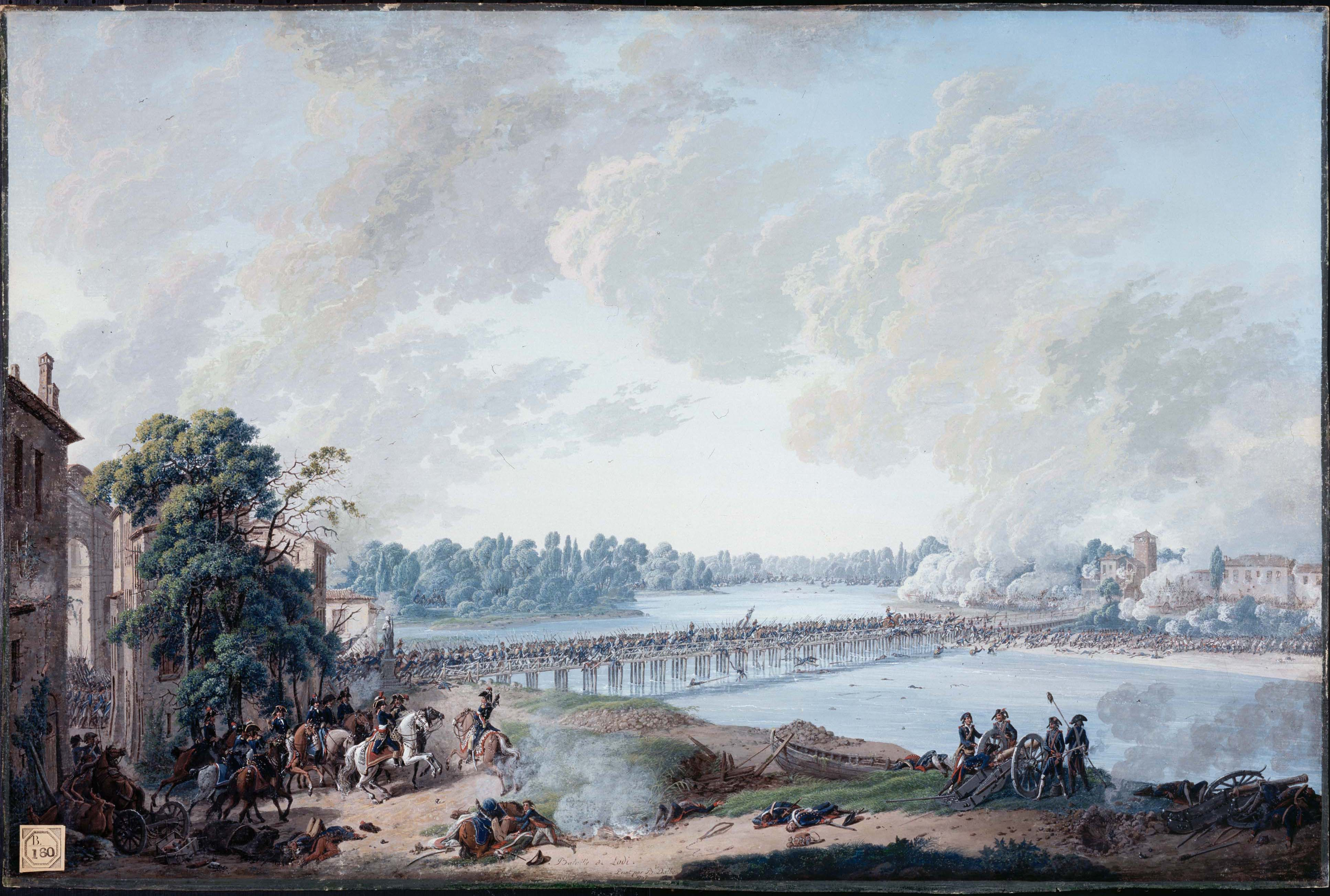
The Battle of the Lodi Bridge depicted in a painting by Louis Albert Guislain Bacler d'Albe

In subsequent eras, Lodi fell under Spanish, Austrian, and French domination. This corresponded to a period of decline and slowed demographic growth, particularly during the Spanish era, when the city was reduced to a veritable fortress. On 10 May 1796, Napoleon Bonaparte defeated the Austrians in the Battle of the Lodi Bridge, paving the way for the conquest of Milan.

In the second half of the 19th century, the city began to expand beyond the ancient medieval walls, particularly following the opening of the Milan-Piacenza railway in 1861 and the establishment of the first industries (including Polenghi Lombardo in 1870). Toward the end of the century, the first social clashes occurred between emerging mass parties.

The people of Lodi played a significant role during the Resistance: the actions of the National Liberation Committee, formed in the city in October 1943, intensified in 1944, culminating in the fatal attack on a fascist party official. The reprisal was severe, and by the end of the year, eleven partisans were executed at the shooting range. Lodi was liberated by the CLN on 27 April 1945: when the Allies arrived from Piacenza, they found the city completely free.

=== Symbols ===
The blazon of the municipal coat of arms is described as follows:

Or, a plain cross gules. External ornaments of a city.

The origins of the emblem are uncertain: some historians suggest it dates back to the time of the First Crusade (1095), although there is no evidence confirming the city’s participation in the enterprise. Most scholars identify an imperial origin, as the gold cross on a red field derives from the banner of Constantine I; the colors were later reversed. According to this interpretation, the city’s banner was created even before the crusade to declare the city’s loyalty to the Ghibelline cause and to distinguish Lodi’s militias during wartime actions.

The gonfalon of the comune displays the heraldic iconography of the coat of arms on the front and two scenes on the back: the first is dedicated to the patron saint Bassianus, while the second depicts Barbarossa presenting the new city’s insignia to Lodi’s notables.

=== Honors ===
Title of City - ribbon for ordinary uniform

Title of City

The comune of Lodi holds the title of city, inherited from Laus Pompeia, an ancient Roman municipium; this status was formally recognized on 3 December 1158 by an imperial diploma issued by Frederick Barbarossa and confirmed by the Imperial Patent of 24 April 1815.

== Geography ==
The territory of Lodi, covering 41.38 km^{2} (15.98 sq mi), is located in the central-southern part of Lombardy, in the area known as the "lower plain". The oldest core of the city is situated on the Eghezzone hill, an approximately trapezoidal elevation on the right bank of the Adda River; the rest of the urban center lies partly on a morphological terrace shaped by the river’s erosion and partly in the floodplain area. The municipal territory ranges in elevation from 65 to 87 m (285 ft) above sea level.

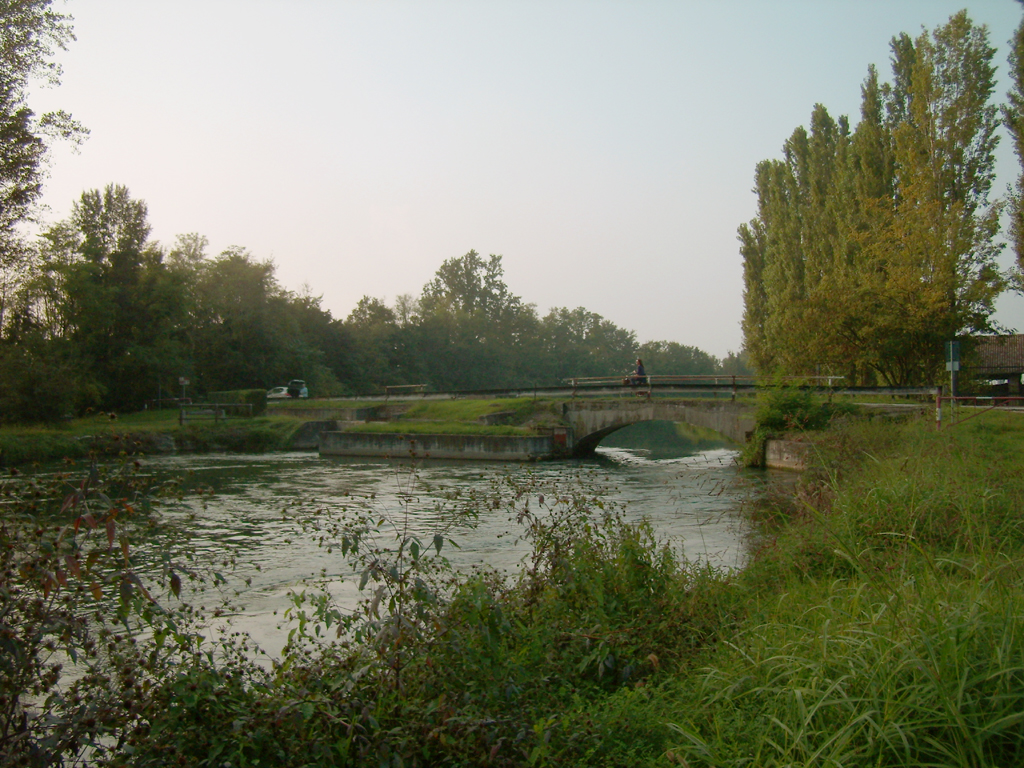
The Muzza Canal, at the border between Lodi and Lodi Vecchio

=== Hamlets ===
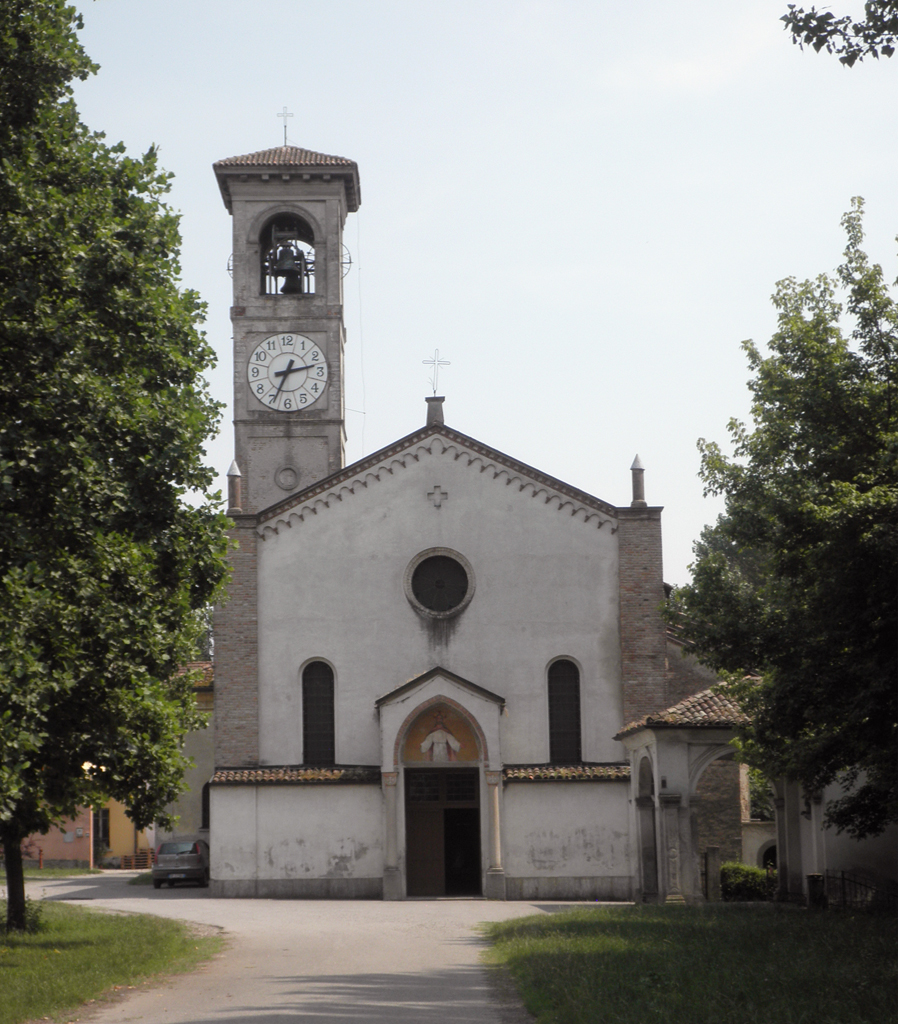
The sanctuary of Fontana

- Fontana is located 3 km northeast of the city, in the portion of the territory on the left bank of the Adda. The locality, which is home to a sanctuary built between the 16th and 17th centuries, is crossed by the former Pavia-Brescia state road and has 304 residents.
- Olmo is a settlement of 197 inhabitants, located 4 km southeast of the city center, along the Via Emilia.
- Riolo, formerly a frazione of the suburban municipality of Vigadore, is a locality situated between Lodi and Dovera, in the Oltreadda Lodigiano. It is adjacent to the route of the Bergamina road and has a primary school; it is home to 120 people.
- San Grato is located in the northwestern sector of the municipal territory, approximately 4 km from the city center; with 692 inhabitants, it is the most populous of Lodi’s hamlets.

==== Other localities in the territory ====
- Bottedo is a rural locality located west of the city, near the Milan-Bologna railway line, about 5 km from the historic center. Until 1873, it was an autonomous municipality; today, it is a large farmstead inhabited by a few families.
- Torre de’ Dardanoni is a farmstead located on the banks of the Cassinetta ditch, near the border with the municipality of Lodi Vecchio, southwest of the capital. Until 1841, it was the seat of a municipality. Due to the depopulation of rural areas, the locality is uninhabited.
- Vigadore is a hamlet of ancient origins with 41 inhabitants. Located on the left bank of the Adda, along the road to Crema, it was an autonomous municipality until 1870.

==== Hydrology ====
The municipal territory is crossed by the Adda River and several other waterways, including the Muzza Canal (which marks its western boundary), the Roggia Bertonica, and the Roggia Molina (whose urban section is now almost entirely underground).

In the Middle Ages, the city was bordered by the Gerundo Lake: the territory was largely marshy and hazardous, but thanks to hydraulic engineering works and the efforts of Cistercian and Benedictine monks, it was reclaimed and transformed into one of the most fertile regions in Europe. Agricultural activity is also supported by the abundant irrigation waters from numerous springs present in the area.

==== Geology and morphology ====
From a petrological perspective, the soil consists of glacial and fluvial deposits that filled the Po Valley between the Upper Pleistocene and the Holocene, during the last glaciation. The lithotypes present are varied and irregularly distributed; they are generally rich in matrix. The soils are predominantly sandy and silty.

==== Seismology ====
The seismic hazard is low and uniformly distributed across the territory: the comune has been classified by the Protezione Civile as "zone 3" (low seismicity).

=== Climate ===
The climate of the Lodi territory, like the rest of the Po Valley, exhibits characteristics typical of a continental climate, specifically the Cfa subtype of the Köppen climate classification (warm-humid temperate climate with hot summers): summers are sweltering and characterized by the phenomenon of sultriness (based on data from the reference period 1961–1990, the average maximum summer temperature is +29.7 °C); conversely, winters are often cold (the average minimum temperature is −0.8 °C) and snowfalls are common, though rarely heavy. A very frequent phenomenon during the winter semester is fog, which can sometimes persist for days due to the absence of synoptic winds at ground level. Autumn and spring are the seasons with the highest precipitation.

The Italian climate classification places Lodi in "zone E" with 2,592 degree days.

Climate data for Lodi (1991–2020)
Month	Jan	Feb	Mar	Apr	May	Jun	Jul	Aug	Sep	Oct	Nov	Dec	Year
Mean daily maximum °C (°F)	6.2 (43.2)	9.3 (48.7)	15.1 (59.2)	19.0 (66.2)	24.1 (75.4)	28.1 (82.6)	30.6 (87.1)	30.1 (86.2)	25.3 (77.5)	18.6 (65.5)	11.7 (53.1)	6.5 (43.7)	18.7 (65.7)
Daily mean °C (°F)	2.7 (36.9)	4.7 (40.5)	9.5 (49.1)	13.4 (56.1)	18.4 (65.1)	22.3 (72.1)	24.4 (75.9)	23.9 (75.0)	19.4 (66.9)	14.0 (57.2)	8.2 (46.8)	3.3 (37.9)	13.7 (56.6)
Mean daily minimum °C (°F)	−0.7 (30.7)	0.1 (32.2)	3.9 (39.0)	7.8 (46.0)	12.6 (54.7)	16.6 (61.9)	18.2 (64.8)	17.7 (63.9)	13.6 (56.5)	9.4 (48.9)	4.7 (40.5)	0.1 (32.2)	8.7 (47.6)
Average precipitation mm (inches)	61 (2.4)	65 (2.6)	69 (2.7)	75 (3.0)	77 (3.0)	68 (2.7)	61 (2.4)	84 (3.3)	71 (2.8)	99 (3.9)	101 (4.0)	67 (2.6)	898 (35.4)
Source 1: Climi e viaggi
Source 2: Istituto Superiore per la Protezione e la Ricerca Ambientale (precipitation 1951–1980)

== Demographics ==
Historical population
Year	Pop.	±%
1861	26,054	—
1871	25,514	−2.1%
1881	25,478	−0.1%
1901	26,827	+5.3%
1911	27,057	+0.9%
1921	27,490	+1.6%
1931	29,839	+8.5%
1936	30,636	+2.7%
1951	35,320	+15.3%
1961	38,158	+8.0%
1971	44,422	+16.4%
1981	43,282	−2.6%
1991	42,250	−2.4%
2001	40,805	−3.4%
2011	43,332	+6.2%
2021	44,716	+3.2%
Source: ISTAT

As of 2026, the population is 45,643, of which 48.9% are male, and 51.1% are female. Minors make up 14.5% of the population, and seniors make up 25.5%.

=== Immigration ===
As of 2025, immigrants make up 16.4% of the total population. The 5 largest foreign countries of birth are Romania, Albania, Egypt, Peru, and Tunisia.

Foreign population by country of birth (2025)
Country of birth	Population
Romania	1,420
Albania	888
Egypt	678
Peru	323
Tunisia	246
Morocco	239
Ecuador	232
Nigeria	224
Togo	192
China	185
Ukraine	184
Ivory Coast	169
Brazil	132
Philippines	131
Moldova	118

=== Quality of life ===
The following table shows the rankings of the municipality of Lodi in the annual report published by Legambiente as part of the "Ecosistema Urbano" survey on the environmental quality of provincial capital cities. Between the 18th and 20th editions of the survey, municipalities were evaluated separately based on population size; Lodi was placed in the group of "small cities".

Year	Ranking	Year	Ranking	Year	Ranking	Year	Ranking
1994	19th	1995	41st (−22)	1996	67th (−26)	1997	13th (+54)
1998	5th (+8)	1999	36th (−31)	2000	13th (+23)	2001	24th (−11)
2002	21st (+3)	2003	17th (+4)	2004	60th (−43)	2005	33rd (+27)
2006	61st (−29)	2007	61st (=)	2008	51st (+10)	2009	60th (−9)
2010	43rd (+17)	2011	9th (Note: The data is not comparable with the previous year: from the 18th to the 20th edition of the survey, municipalities were placed in separate categories based on population size.)	2012	9th (=)	2013	19th (−10)
2014	47th	2015	61st (−14)	2016	65th (−4)	2017	20th (+45)
2018	35th (−15)	2019	27th (+8)	2020	25th (+2)	2021	31st (−6)
2022	35th (−4)	2023	26th (+9)	2024		2025	

== Administration ==
The administrative history of the Municipality of Lodi since the establishment of the Italian Republic can be divided into two phases: for the first thirty years, only mayors from the Christian Democracy party succeeded one another, while from 1975 onward, the city has been predominantly governed by representatives of left or center-left coalitions.

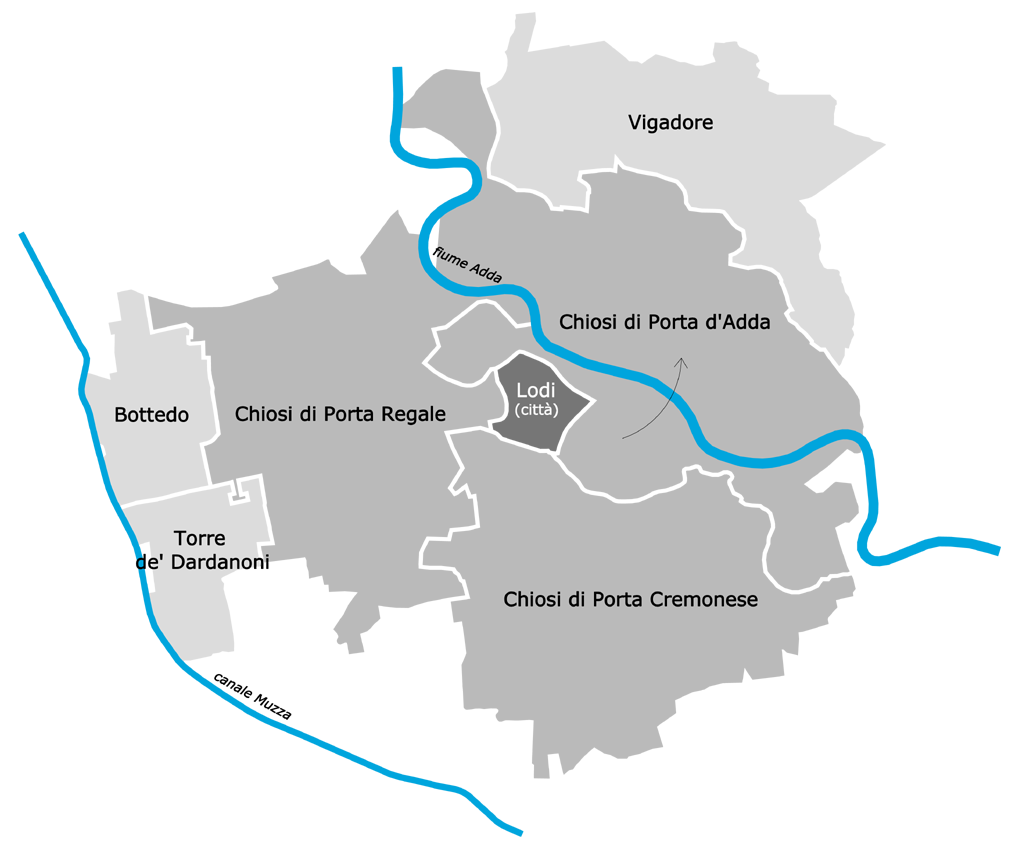
Subdivision of Lodi’s suburb before 1840, with the three chiosi and the three external municipalities

=== Other administrative information ===
The municipality is part of the management consortium of the Adda Sud Park, whose headquarters are located in Lodi.

In 1877, the suburban municipalities of Chiosi Uniti con Bottedo and Chiosi d’Adda Vigadore were annexed to the municipal territory. The term "chiosi", of dialectal origin, referred to the agricultural lands surrounding the city of Lodi, similar to the more well-known Corpi Santi around Milan.

== Sights ==
=== Religious architecture ===
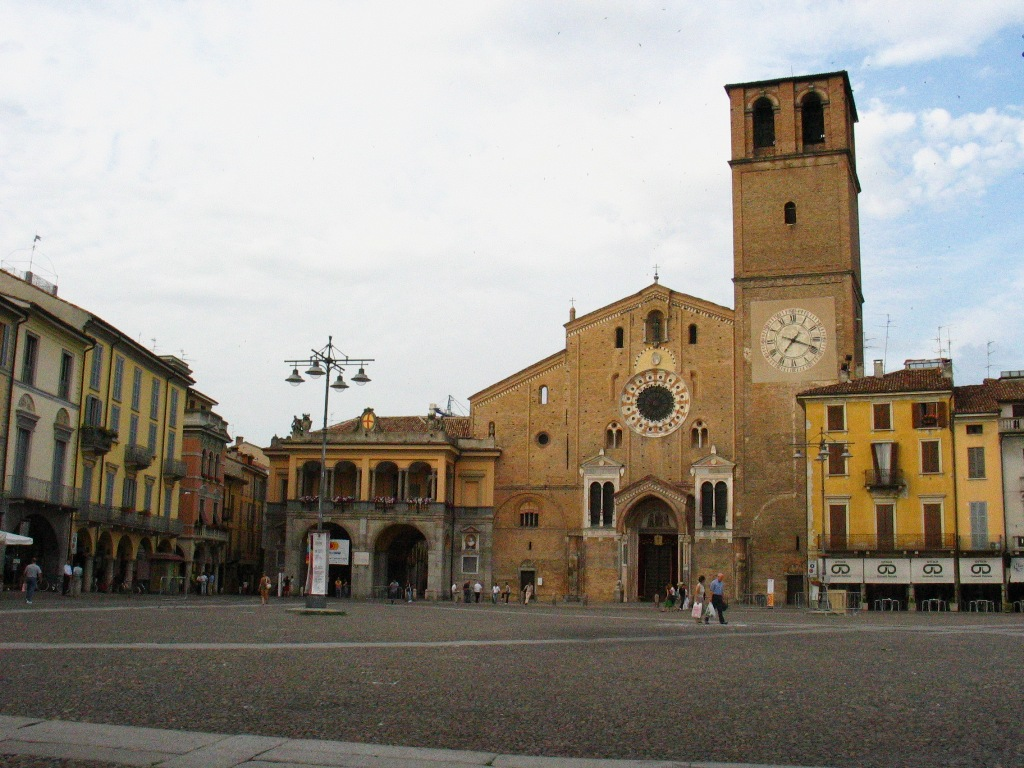
The facade of the Cathedral dominates Piazza della Vittoria

Cathedral
It is the oldest and most significant monument in Lodi, as well as one of the largest churches in Lombardy. Its construction symbolically began on 3 August 1158, the same day as the city’s founding, and was completed in 1284. The asymmetrical terracotta facade is typically Romanesque, though characterized by a tall prothyrum in Gothic style and a large rose window in Renaissance style; the bell tower, built between 1538 and 1554 based on a design by the Lodi native Callisto Piazza, remained unfinished for military security reasons. The interior, with three naves covered by rib vaults, houses notable works of art, including a polyptych by Callisto Piazza. The oldest part of the building is the crypt, which contains the relics of the patron saint Bassianus; in the left apsidiole, there is also a 15th-century sculptural group depicting the Lamentation over the Dead Christ.

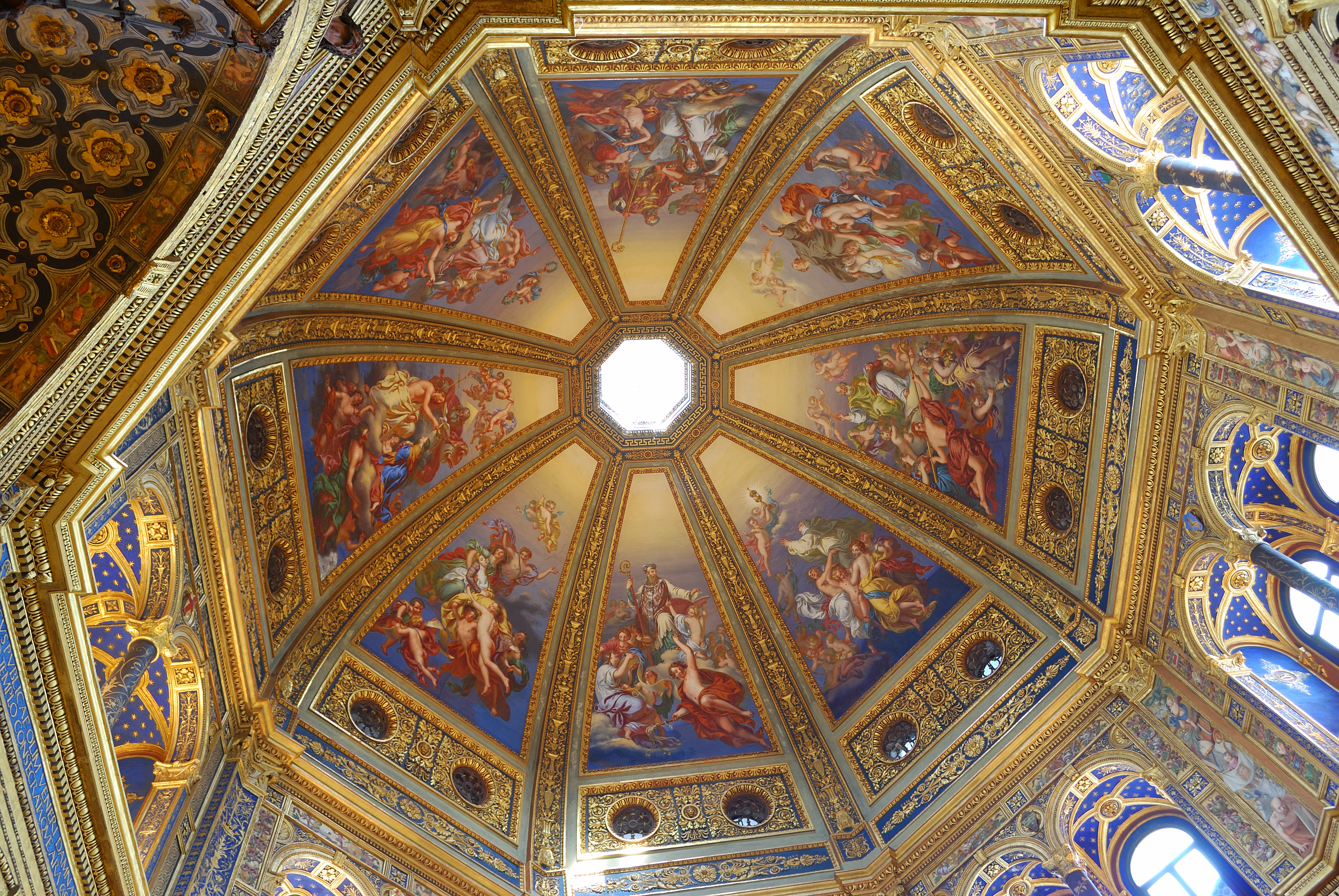
Interior of the Civic Temple of the Crowned Virgin

Civic Temple of the Crowned Virgin
Located in a characteristic narrow street near Piazza della Vittoria, it is considered a masterpiece of Lombard Renaissance and represents the city’s most prestigious monument from an artistic perspective. Designed in 1488 by Giovanni Battagio, it was built at the comune’s expense as an expression of popular religiosity on the site of a former brothel. The temple is a small octagonal structure, topped by an eight-segment dome surmounted by a lantern; the pointed bell tower and facade were completed in later periods. The interior is adorned with lavish gold decorations and houses numerous frescoes, panels, and canvases created between the late 15th and early 19th centuries by Bergognone, the Piazza workshop, and Stefano Maria Legnani; the dome’s segments were frescoed in the 19th century by Enrico Scuri.

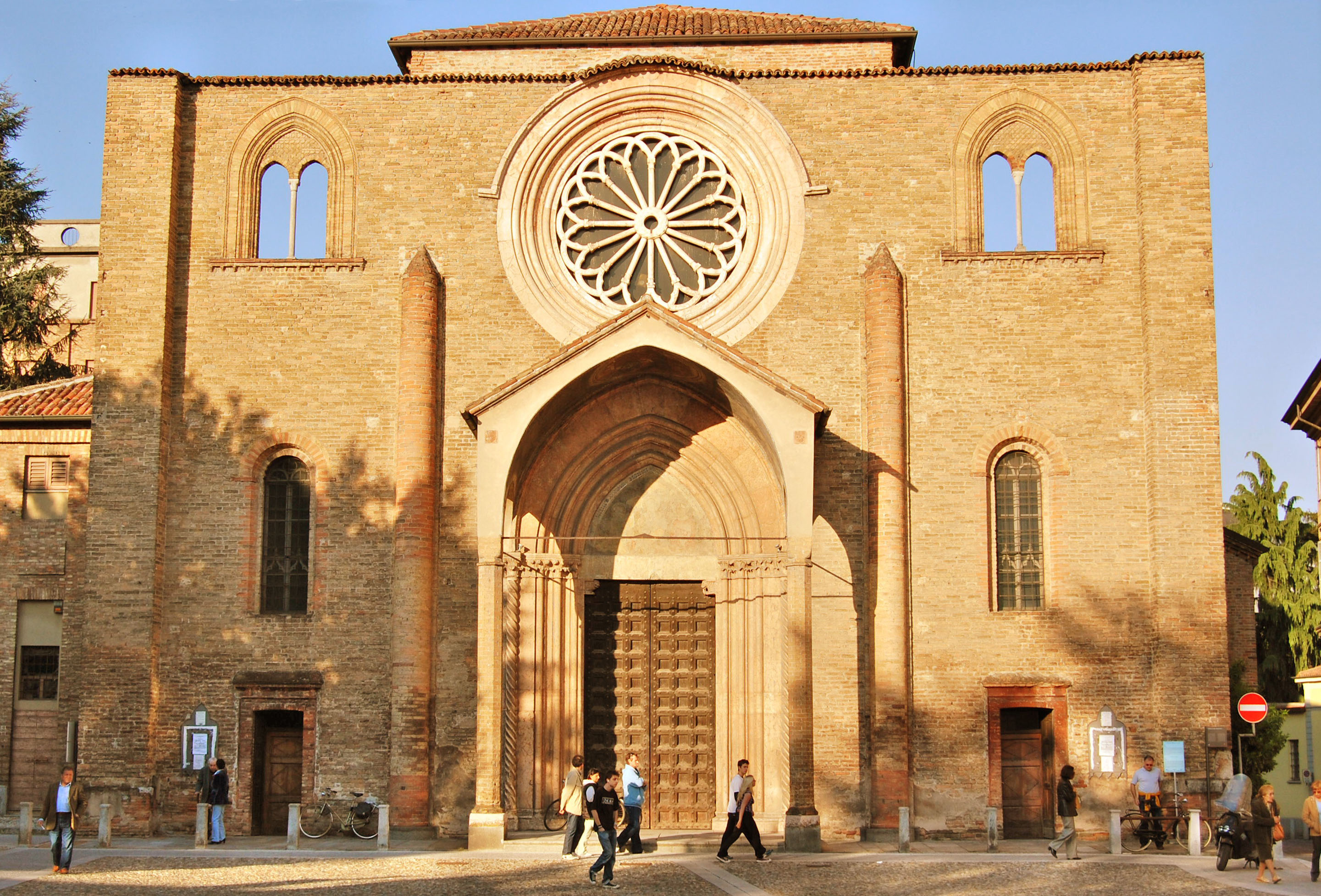
Facade of the Church of San Francesco

Church of San Francesco
Built between 1280 and 1307, its terracotta facade, left unfinished just above the marble rose window, features a tall prothyrum and two open biforas, representing the first example of an architectural design that spread throughout northern Italy. The interior, with three naves and a Latin cross plan, is decorated with numerous frescoes from the 14th to 18th centuries; the church also houses the remains of notable Lodi figures, including the librettist Francesco De Lemene, the poet Ada Negri, and the naturalist Agostino Bassi.

Church of San Lorenzo
It is the oldest church in Lodi after the Cathedral. The interior, with three naves, houses significant works of art, including two frescoes by Callisto Piazza. The typically Romanesque facade is characterized by two semicylindrical pilasters and a terracotta-framed rose window, above which is an aedicule with a statue of the saint.

Church of Sant'Agnese
In the 14th-century Lombard Gothic style, it houses an important work of art: the Galliani Polyptych created in 1520 by Alberto Piazza. The rose window decorated with polychrome majolica is also noteworthy. Adjacent to the church is the former convent with a cloister featuring pointed arches, transformed in the 19th century into a lavish residence now divided into private apartments.

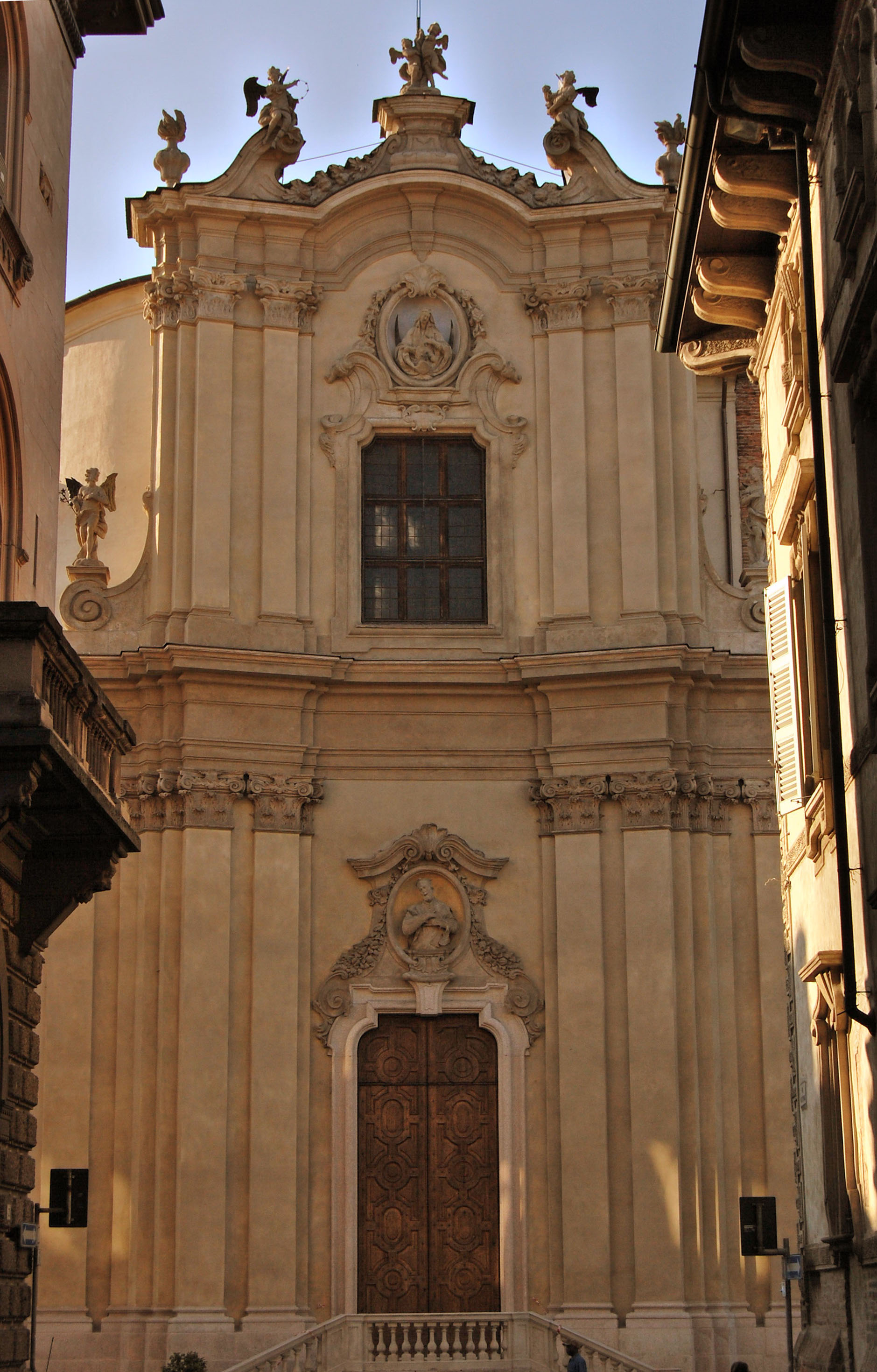
Facade of the Church of San Filippo

Church of San Filippo Neri
The building, in Rococo style, was constructed opposite the end of a long street, in keeping with the scenic style of the era. The interior, in a Greek cross plan, is entirely adorned with precious 18th-century frescoes.

Episcopal Palace
Built in the medieval period and renovated in the 18th century by architect Antonio Veneroni (in collaboration with the Sartorio brothers), it is characterized by a massive and austere structure. Noteworthy is the courtyard with paired columns. The elegant interior features some rooms decorated in the 18th century: notable are the former episcopal chapel and the frescoes by Carlo Innocenzo Carloni.

Church of Santa Maria delle Grazie
Built between 1669 and 1743 to house a sacred image of the Virgin, considered miraculous. The Greek cross interior is fully decorated with frescoes, canvases, and stucco; a side chapel contains the Neoclassical tomb of Maria Cosway, a benefactress of the city.

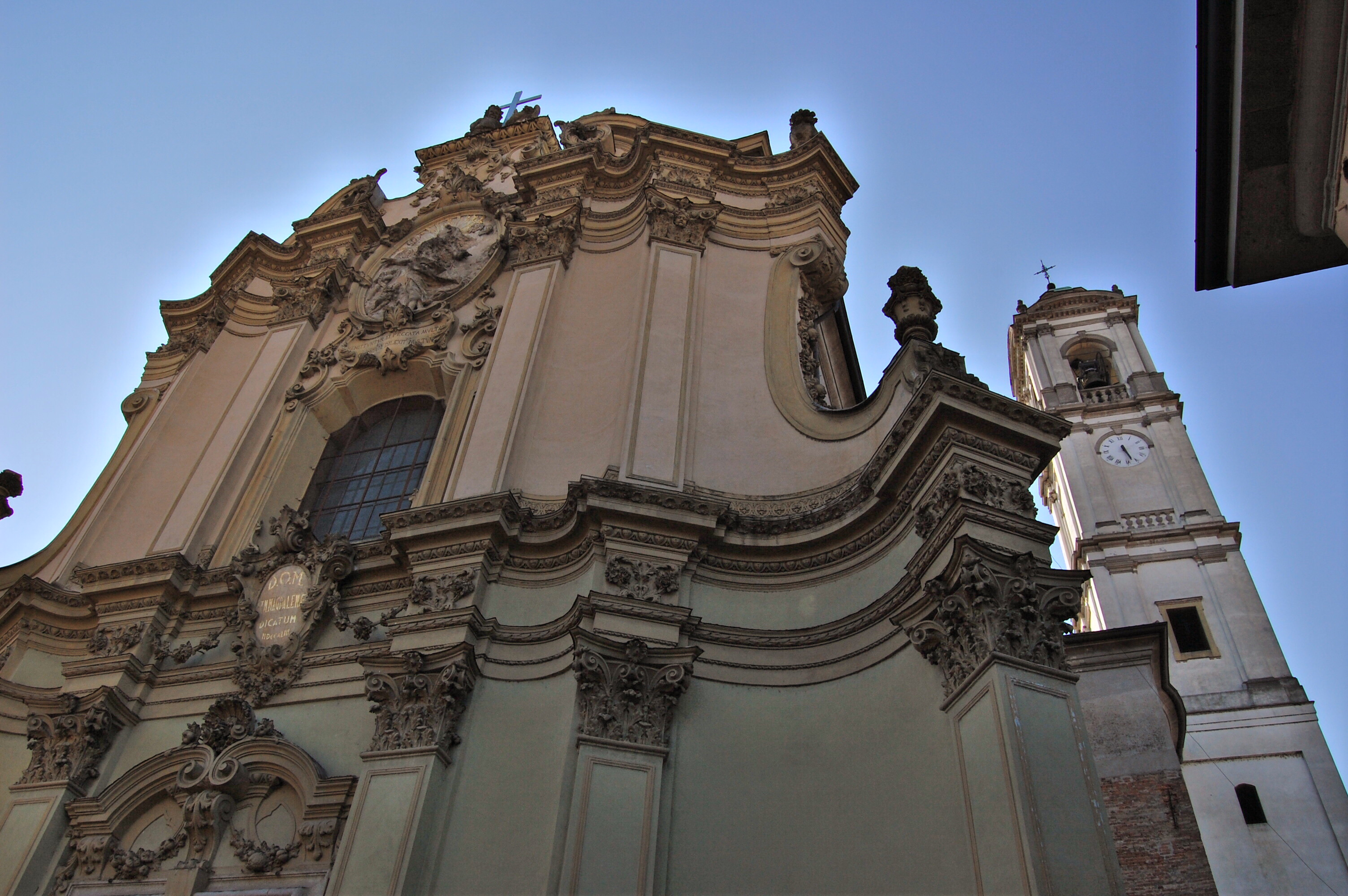
Facade of the Church of Santa Maria Maddalena

Church of Santa Maria Maddalena
Located near the Adda river, slightly off-center from the heart of the medieval historic center, it represents the best example of a Baroque building in the city. Completed in the first half of the 18th century, except for the facade, the church features a single nave with an elliptical plan.

Church of Santa Chiara Nuova
A small space housing notable artistic works. It is located in a very narrow street, typical of medieval Lodi. The small building consists of two distinct structures, one in the Romanesque style and the other in the Rococo style.

Church of San Cristoforo
Designed by Milanese architect Pellegrino Tibaldi and deconsecrated since 1798, it hosted a major exhibition dedicated to the Piazza family of painters from Lodi in 1989 and a retrospective on the graphic work of American artist Andy Warhol in 2001.

Former convents of San Cristoforo and San Domenico
They serve as the headquarters of the Province of Lodi; the internal cloisters are noteworthy.

Church of San Gualtero
In Neoclassical style, it was built in a peripheral area in 1835, on the occasion of the visit of Emperor of Austria Ferdinand I. The building preserves the relics of the Lodi saint to whom it is dedicated.

Church of Santi Bassiano e Fereolo
Erected in the second half of the 17th century, it houses a wooden choir with nine stalls.

=== Civil architecture ===
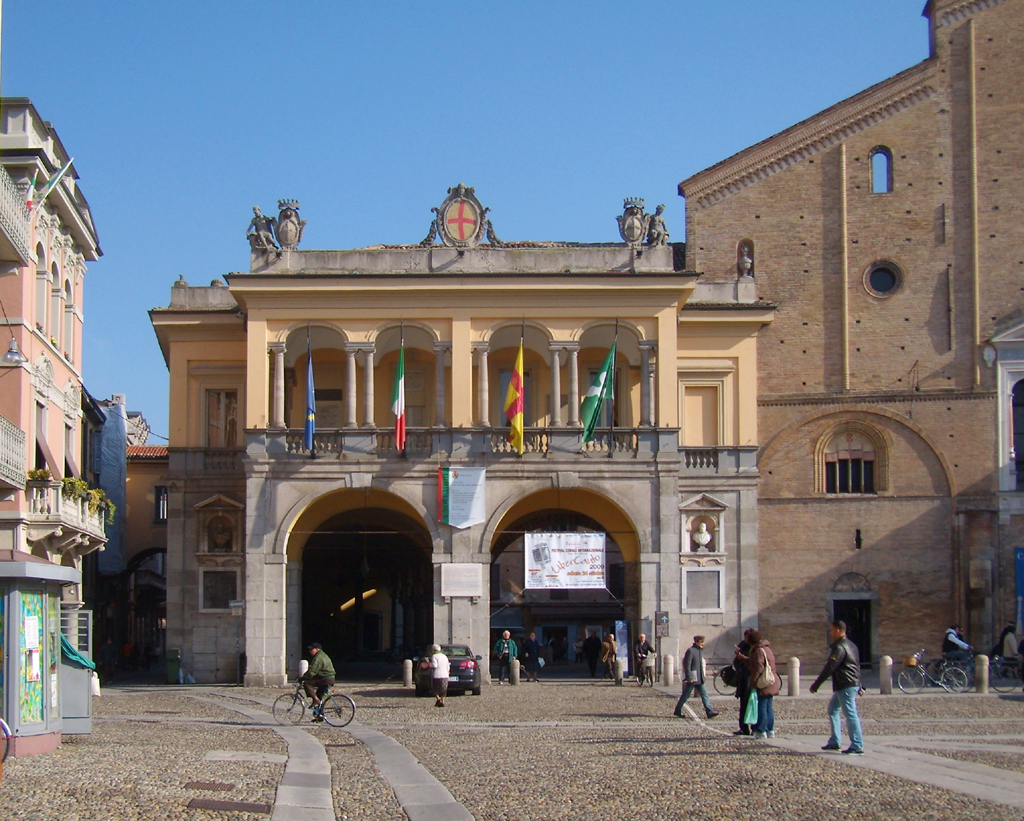
Palazzo Broletto, seat of the municipal administration

Palazzo Broletto
Built in 1284 next to the Cathedral, after numerous renovations, it has Neoclassical forms, as evident from the portico and the upper loggia, which opens onto the municipal council chamber. On either side of the portico are the busts of Gnaeus Pompeius Strabo, who granted the title of municipium to Laus Pompeia (left), and Frederick Barbarossa, founder of Laus Nova (right).

Ospedale Maggiore
The oldest core of the building dates back to the 15th century; the structure was later expanded and converted into a hospital. The Neoclassical facade was designed at the end of the 18th century by Giuseppe Piermarini, the same architect of the Teatro alla Scala in Milan. Inside, there is a cloister with a portico, loggia, and 15th-century terracotta decorations.

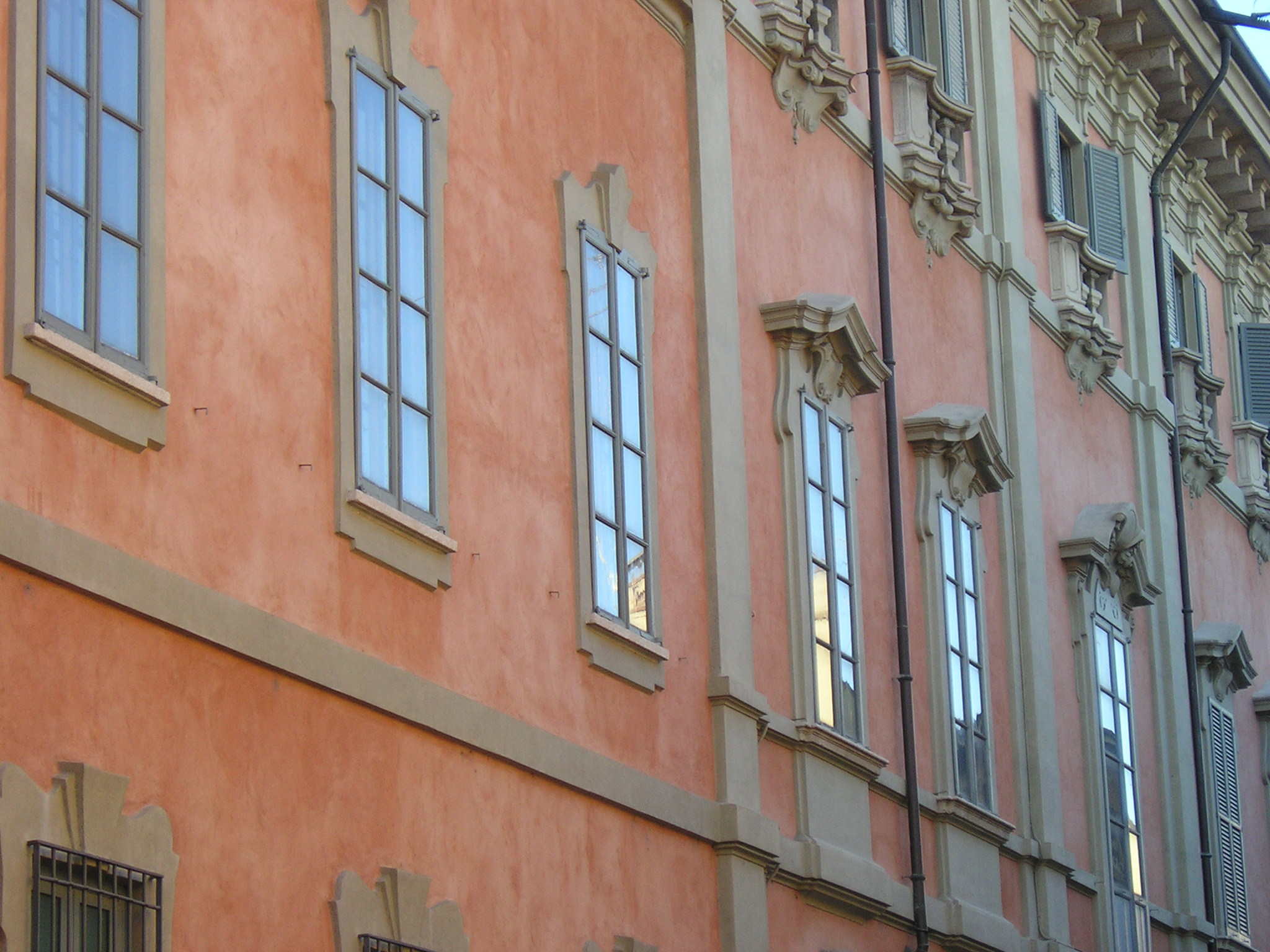
Palazzo Modignani

Palazzo Mozzanica
Built in the second half of the 15th century, it is the finest example of a Lodi patrician residence. The facade features a terracotta frieze decorated with floral crowns and marine mythology figures; the portal is adorned with medallions depicting Gian Galeazzo Visconti, Isabella of Aragon, Francesco Sforza, and Bianca Maria Sforza. The upper floor is rich in frescoes. According to historian Giovanni Agnelli, Francis I of France stayed there during the summer of 1509.

Palazzo Modignani
Dating to the 18th century, it hosted numerous illustrious figures, including Napoleon Bonaparte and Austrian Emperor Franz Joseph. It features a large internal courtyard accessed through a wrought iron gate by Alessandro Mazzucotelli; the piano nobile is richly frescoed.

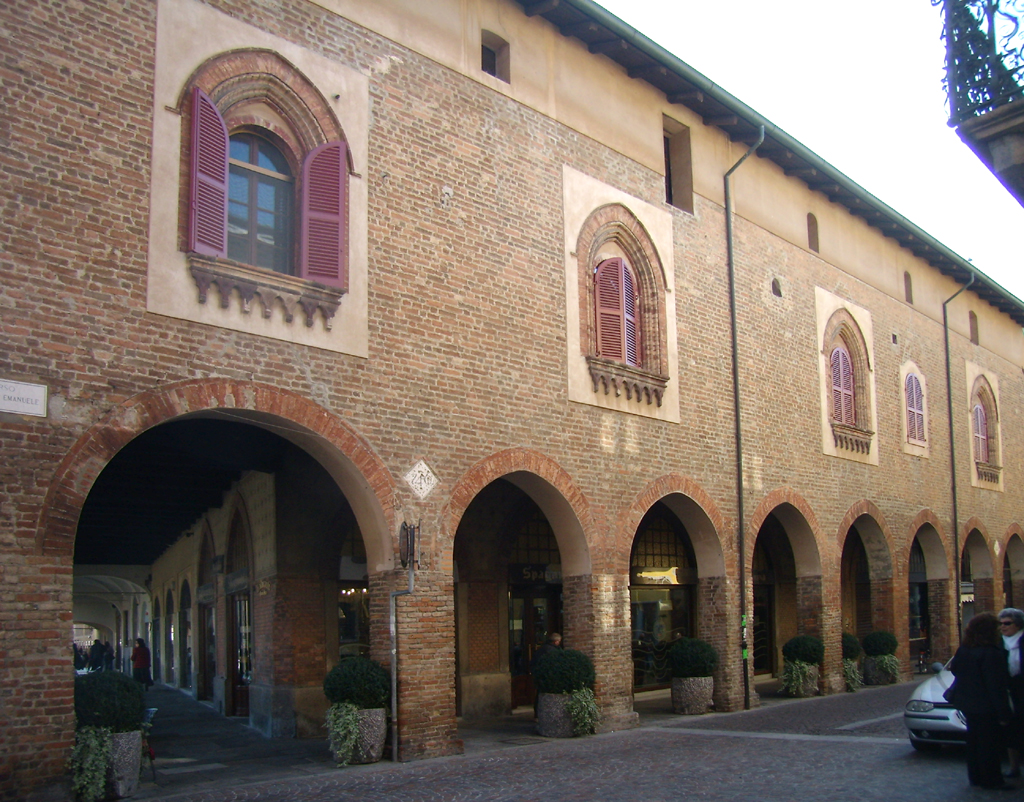
Palazzo Vistarini

Palazzo Vistarini
Built in the 14th century, it owes its name to the influential Ghibelline family that commissioned it. The structure is in Gothic style: the brick facade is enhanced by monoforas with terracotta frames; the portico features pointed arches and partially frescoed vaults.

Palazzo Galeano
A Baroque building from the 17th century, expanded and transformed in later periods.

Palazzo Villani
Erected in the 16th century, it is distinguished by a 16th-century facade with Baroque architectural elements.

Teatro alle Vigne
The city’s main theater. Originally a church, it was the clergy house of the order of the Humiliati; in 1570, it passed to the Barnabite fathers, who converted the building into a higher institute of theology. After numerous changes in use and a radical renovation, it became the theater’s headquarters in 1985.

Palazzo del Governo
One of the city’s most original buildings from an architectural perspective; it is a large palace occupying an entire block behind the municipal palace and overlooking Piazza del Mercato. Built in 1929 on medieval foundations, the building combines different styles: notably, the bossage of the lower order recalls Venetian architecture. Since 1995, it has been the seat of the Prefecture of Lodi.

Villa Braila
A historic residence in Liberty style, located southeast of the city center and surrounded by an extensive public park.

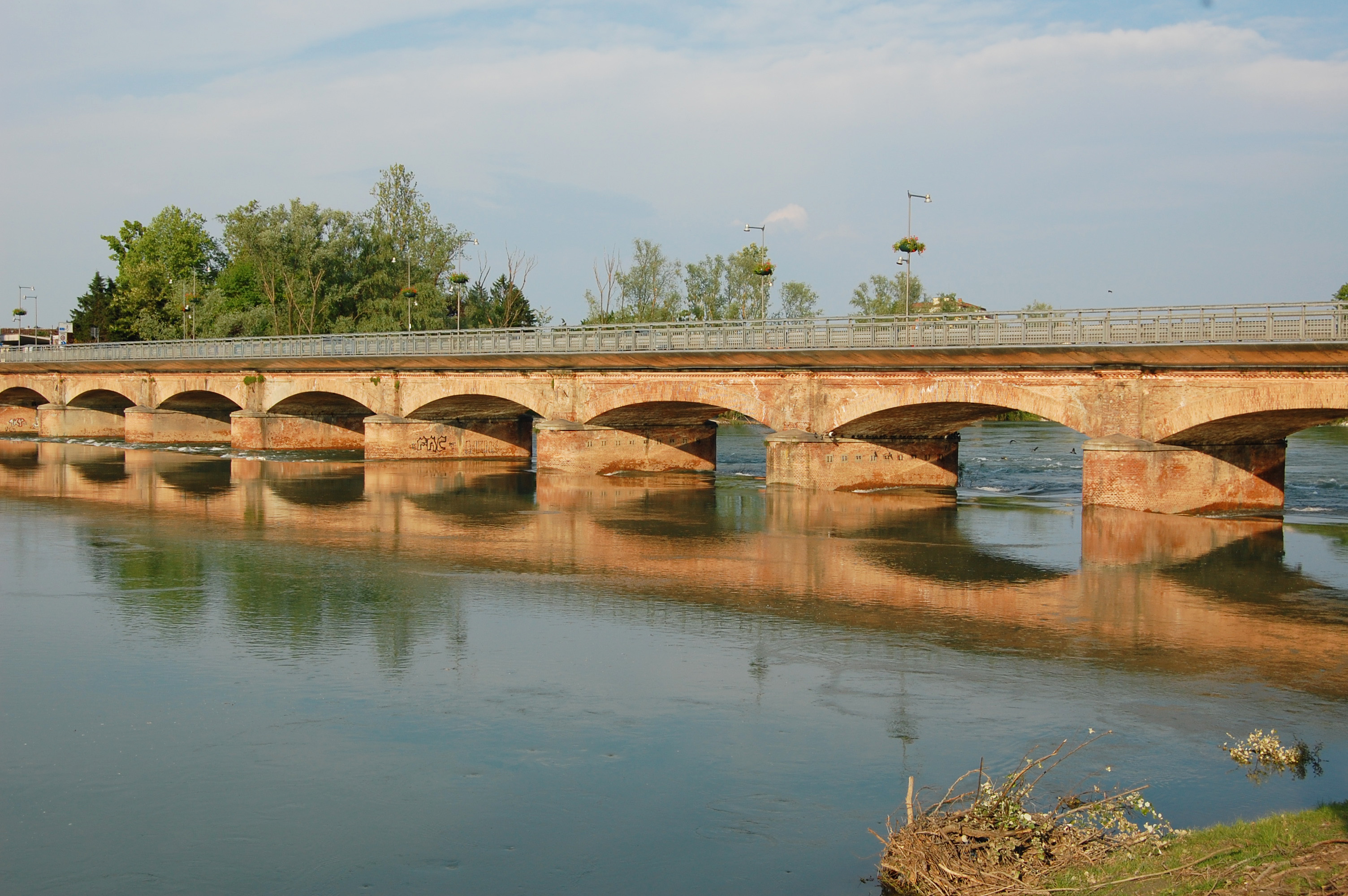
The Adda Bridge

Adda Bridge
An arch bridge that crosses the river, connecting the Borgo Adda district with Revellino-Campo di Marte. Built in 1864 to replace the original wooden bridge where the Battle of Lodi took place, which was burned by Austrian troops in 1859 during the Second Italian War of Independence.

Headquarters of Banca Popolare di Lodi
Designed by Renzo Piano and located near the railway station close to the historic center, it spans over 3,000 m^{2} (32,000 sq ft) and represents the city’s most interesting architectural construction from the second half of the 20th century. It has been used as a setting for several commercials.

=== Military architecture ===
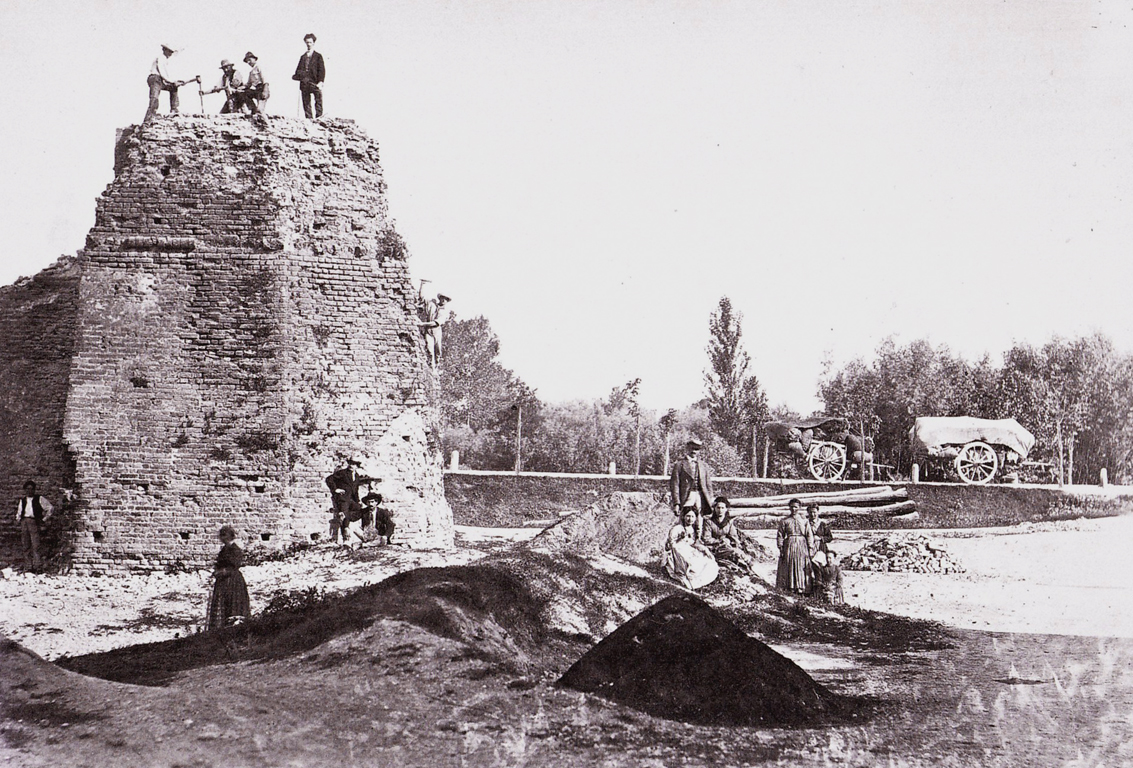
Demolition works of the Revellino fort (current Piazzale Crema), July 1872

Walls of Lodi
The city’s first defensive structure—already protected on three sides by the Adda marshes—consisted of a simple wooden palisade protected by a moat through which the Roggia Molina flowed, effectively turning Lodi into an island (Note: Between 1931 and 1937, after the walls were demolished, the moat was filled and transformed into the current public gardens.). The construction of the walls began on 3 August 1160, in the presence of Frederick Barbarossa, Bishop Alberigo Merlino, and the Cremonese architect Tinto Muso de Gata, and was completed in 1211. These walls were at least six or seven meters high, with merlons shaped like swallowtails, reflecting the city’s Ghibelline allegiance. During the Sforza period, defensive systems were particularly developed near the river, with the construction of the ravelin on the Crema bank and two towers at the ends of the Adda bridge. In 1607, during the Spanish era, extensive bastions were built extending toward the countryside, giving the city a "star-shaped" structure. Deemed obsolete and unusable, they were quickly demolished in the mid-18th century during the Austrian period, replaced by the ring road. The ancient walls were largely demolished in the 20th century due to urban expansion; today, traces remain in various parts of the city, including the Observatory of San Vincenzo near the Isola Carolina park.

Visconti Castle
A typical medieval fortress, largely destroyed; its tall and massive keep is one of the city’s most iconic symbols. The building is not open to visitors as it houses the offices of the Lodi Police Headquarters.

Porta Cremona
The only surviving gate of the city’s ancient access points. Its current appearance is due to a complete reconstruction between 1790 and 1792 by architect Antonio Dossena.

=== Streets and squares ===
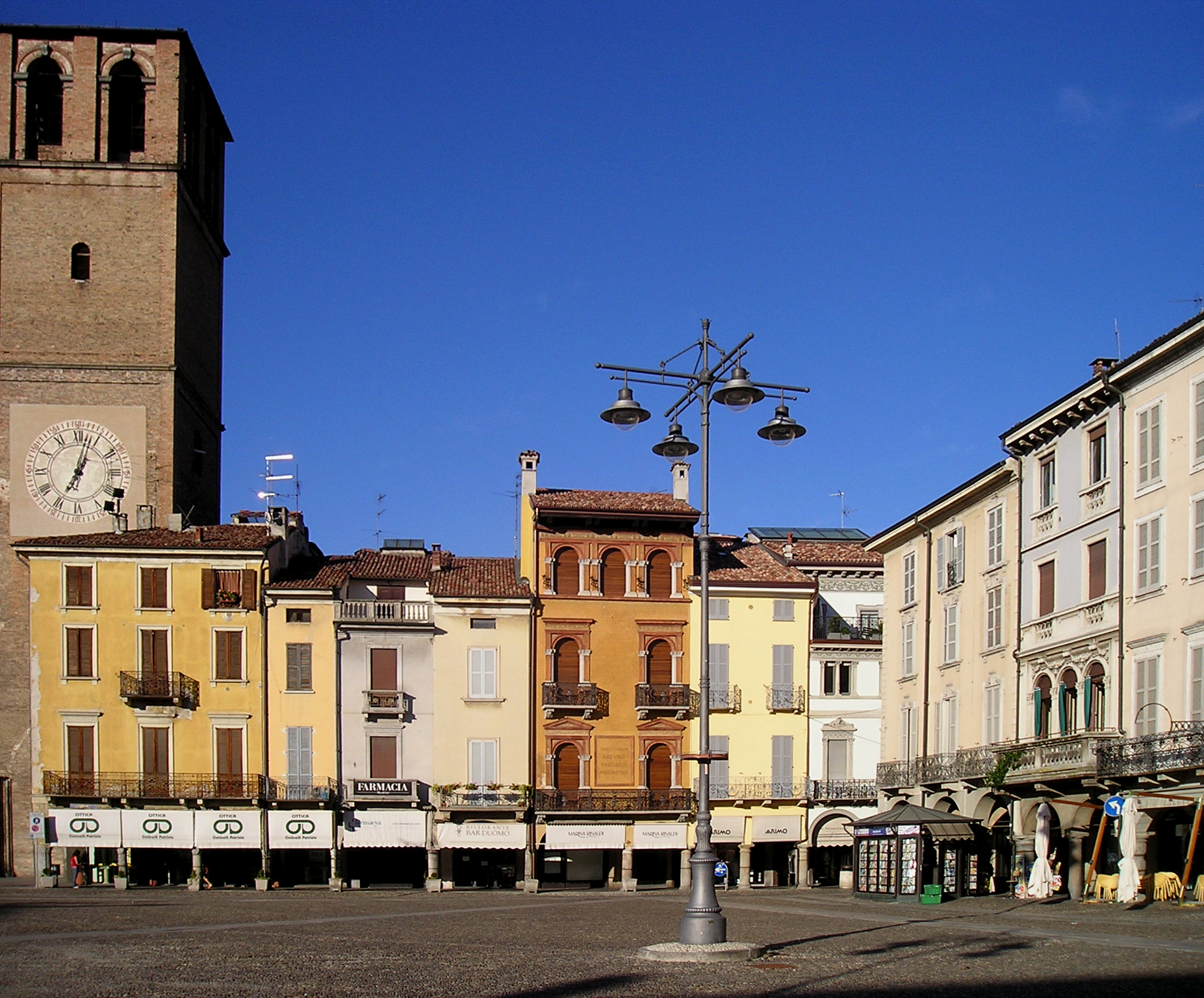
Piazza della Vittoria

Piazza della Vittoria
Known as "Piazza Maggiore" until 1924, it is the heart of the city: notably, the Cathedral and the municipal palace (Palazzo Broletto) face onto it. Characterized by a quadrangular plan, it is a rare example of a square with porticos on all four sides. This unique feature, combined with the elegance of the variously colored and sized palaces surrounding it, makes it a particularly evocative place, so much so that the Touring Club Italiano included it in 2004 in the list of Italy’s most beautiful squares. The paving of the square, in the typical Lombard cobblestone made of river pebbles, dates back to 1471 or, according to some sources, to the 18th century.

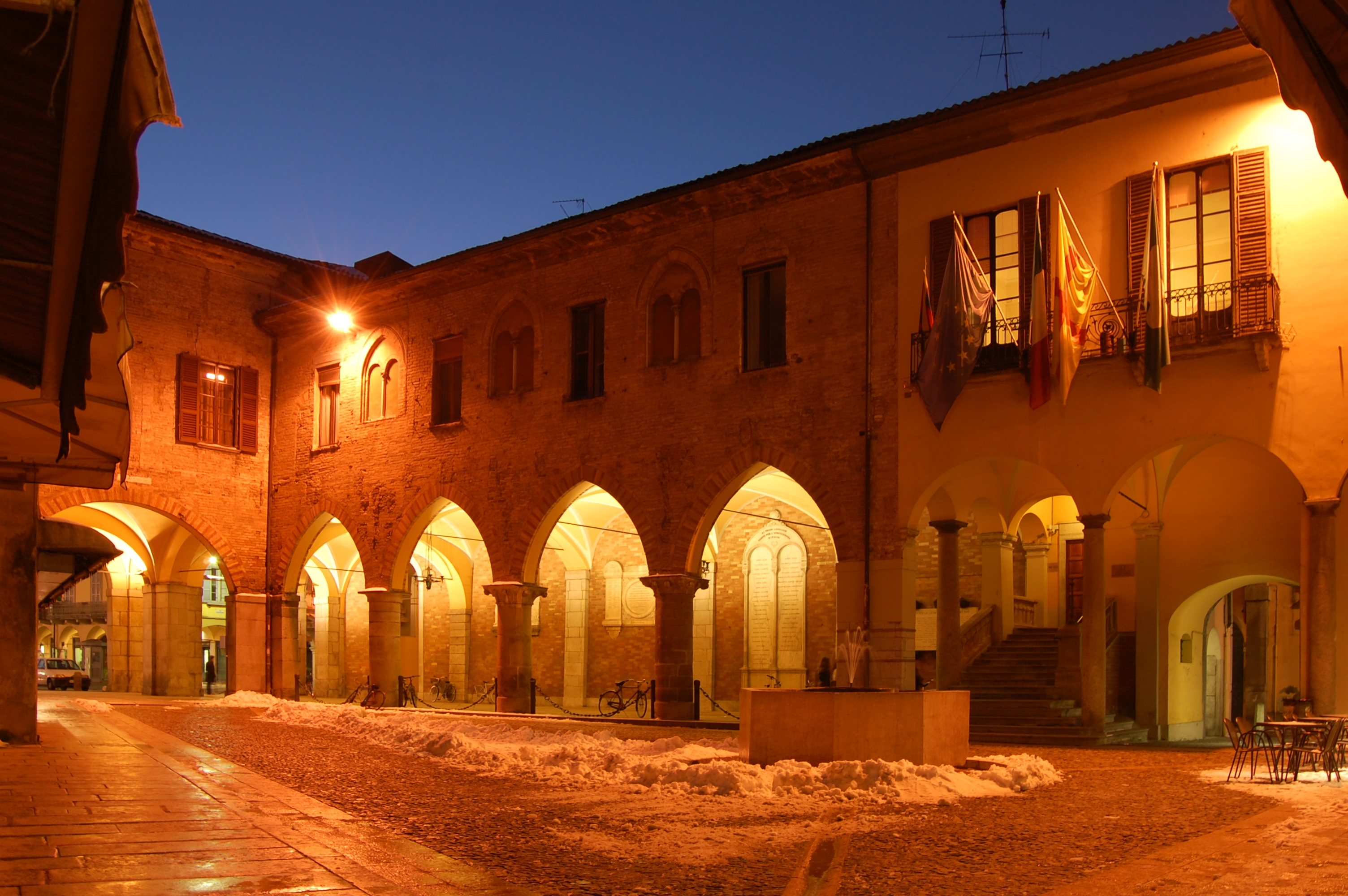
Piazza Broletto at night

Piazza Broletto
A small trapezoidal area enclosed between the porticos of Palazzo Broletto and the left side of the Cathedral. In the medieval period, it was the hub of the city’s public life, and it now serves as the seat of municipal authority. At its center is a fountain in pink Carrara marble, derived from the baptismal font of the Cathedral and dating to the 14th century. It is a pedestrian area.

Piazza del Mercato
A rectangular square, also paved with the typical cobblestone, where the apse of the Cathedral, a secondary wing of Palazzo Broletto, the Palazzo del Governo, and the Episcopal Palace face. On Saturdays and Sundays, the traditional street market is held here.

Piazza Castello
A relatively large square, designated as a pedestrian area except for the central strip open to vehicular traffic; it takes its name from the Visconti Castle that faces it. Notable is the statue dedicated to Victor Emmanuel II, celebrating Italian unification. The square borders the Isola Carolina park.

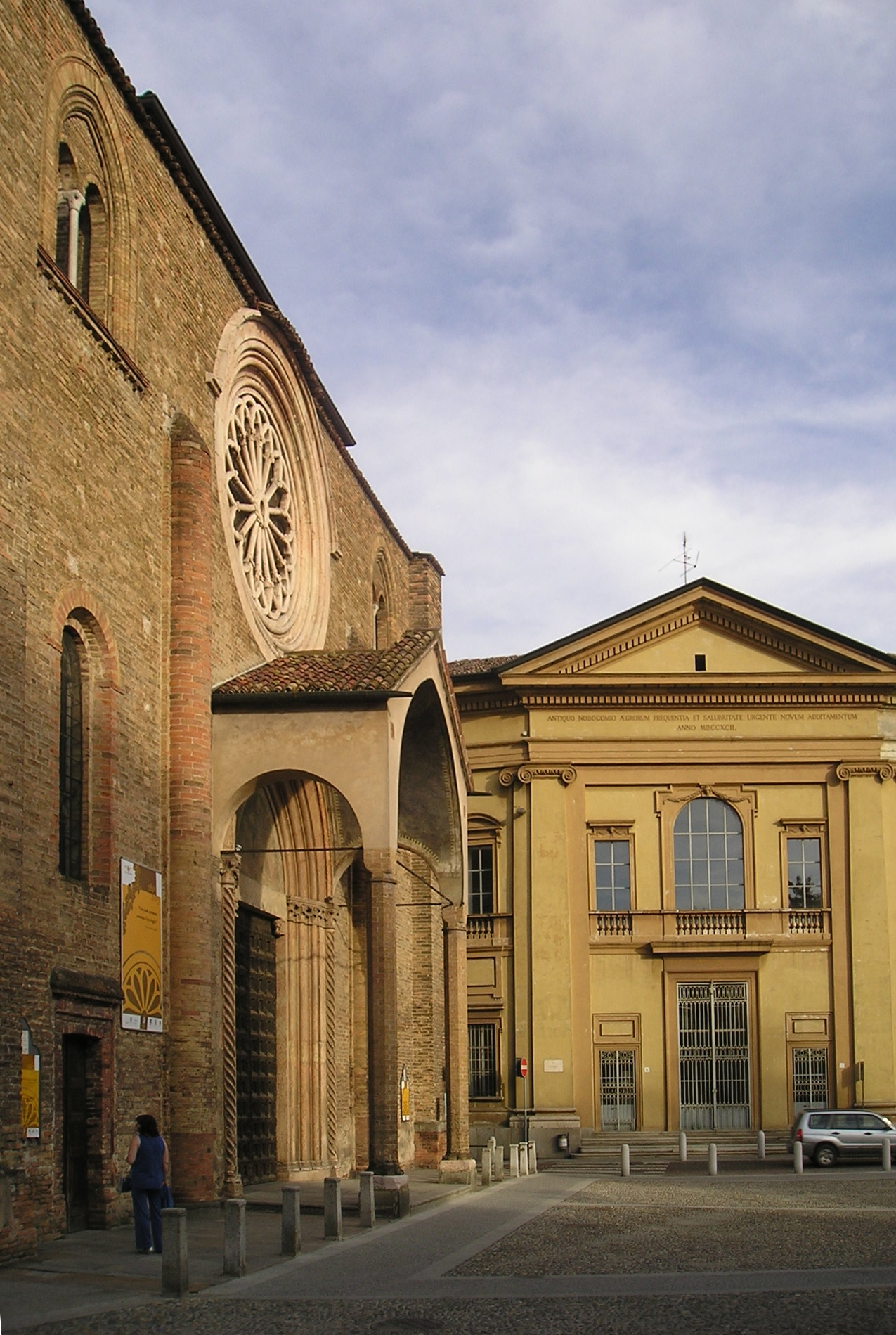
View of Piazza Ospitale

Piazza Ospitale
Commonly called "Piazza San Francesco", it is celebrated in some works by the poet Ada Negri. This rectangular square, also paved with cobblestone and designated as a pedestrian area, is characterized by the presence of the Church of San Francesco and the facade of the Ospedale Maggiore; it also features a statue of the scientist Paolo Gorini.

Piazza San Lorenzo
A very small square, almost hidden among a maze of narrow, winding streets typical of Lodi’s medieval historic center. Its intimate yet luminous atmosphere recalls a Venetian square. The square takes its name from the church it faces and is also a pedestrian area.

Corso Roma
Originating from Piazza della Vittoria, it is heavily frequented due to its numerous commercial activities. Like other streets in the city center, its main attraction is the presence of Liberty-style palaces and the evocative internal courtyards of noble residences.

=== Natural areas ===
Isola Carolina Park
Located near the historic center, close to Piazza della Vittoria and Piazza Castello, it takes its name from the Carolina farmhouse, which was named in 1825 in honor of Caroline Augusta of Bavaria, wife of Emperor Francis I of Austria. The park covers approximately 50,000 m^{2} (540,000 sq ft) and was created in the mid-1950s thanks to a donation from Enrico Mattei, who wanted to repay the city where significant natural gas deposits were discovered. Mattei spared no expense and planted species of notable botanical interest, selected from the Lake Como area. Since 2006, it has hosted the headquarters of the Adda Sud Park.

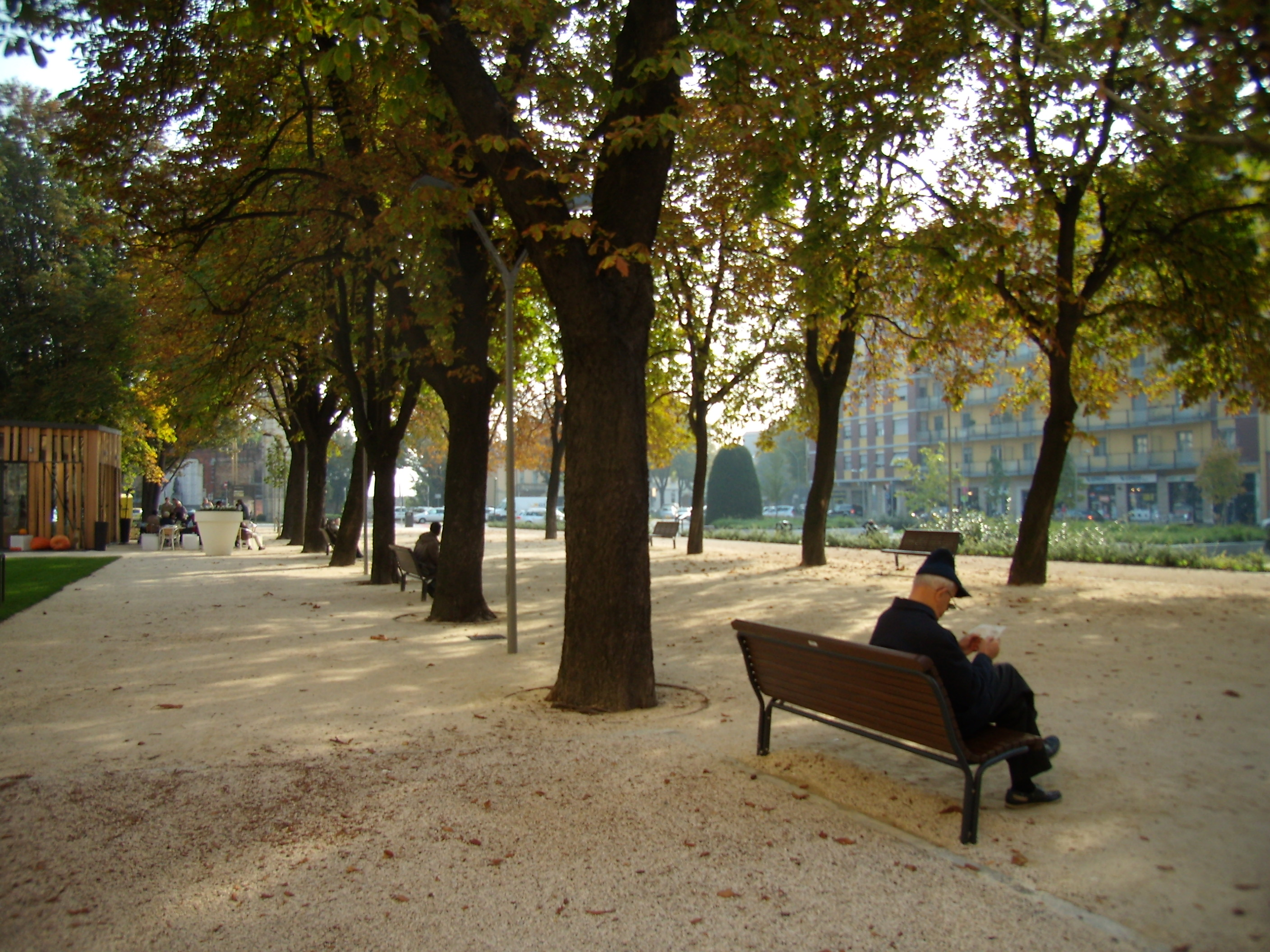
The Federico Barbarossa public gardens

Federico Barbarossa Public Gardens
Located almost in the heart of the city center, along Viale IV Novembre, they occupy the area that was the leveling of the moat where, until the 1930s, the Roggia Molina flowed, which was channeled and covered between 1931 and 1937 thanks to a project by local architect Giovanni Attilio Fugazza. The original core of the gardens dates to 1835, the year of Emperor Ferdinand I of Austria’s visit to the city. At the center stands the Monument to the Resistance, a 1967 work by sculptor Gianni Vigorelli.

Lungo Adda Bonaparte
Visitors can stroll along the banks of the Adda River and enjoy the surrounding river vegetation; it was one of the favorite places of the poet Giosuè Carducci when visiting Lodi.

Bosco del Belgiardino
A small naturalistic oasis on the banks of the Adda, at the border with the territory of Montanaso Lombardo; numerous paths originate from the area, allowing visits to the surrounding woods, partially transformed into a botanical garden, where waterfowl such as moorhens, mallards, swans, herons, and little grebes live. During the summer, it becomes a recreational center thanks to a swimming pool managed by the Comune of Lodi.

Great Lodi Forest (Bosco Valle Grassa-Coldana-Sant'Antonio)
An area of significant naturalistic interest, created by the Province of Lodi with funding from the Lombardy Region. Located near the urban center, it can be visited via bicycle and pedestrian paths. It is a reforestation project with native tree and shrub species, with a permanent legal designation as a forest.

=== The market ===
The street market in the historic center is one of the city's oldest and most significant popular traditions. It takes place on Saturdays and Sundays in the square of the same name, while on Tuesdays and Thursdays, it is held in Piazza della Vittoria. The market consists of a variable number of stalls, ranging from 75 to 78. At the stalls specializing in food products, visitors can find typical items of local cuisine.

=== The Palio dei Rioni ===
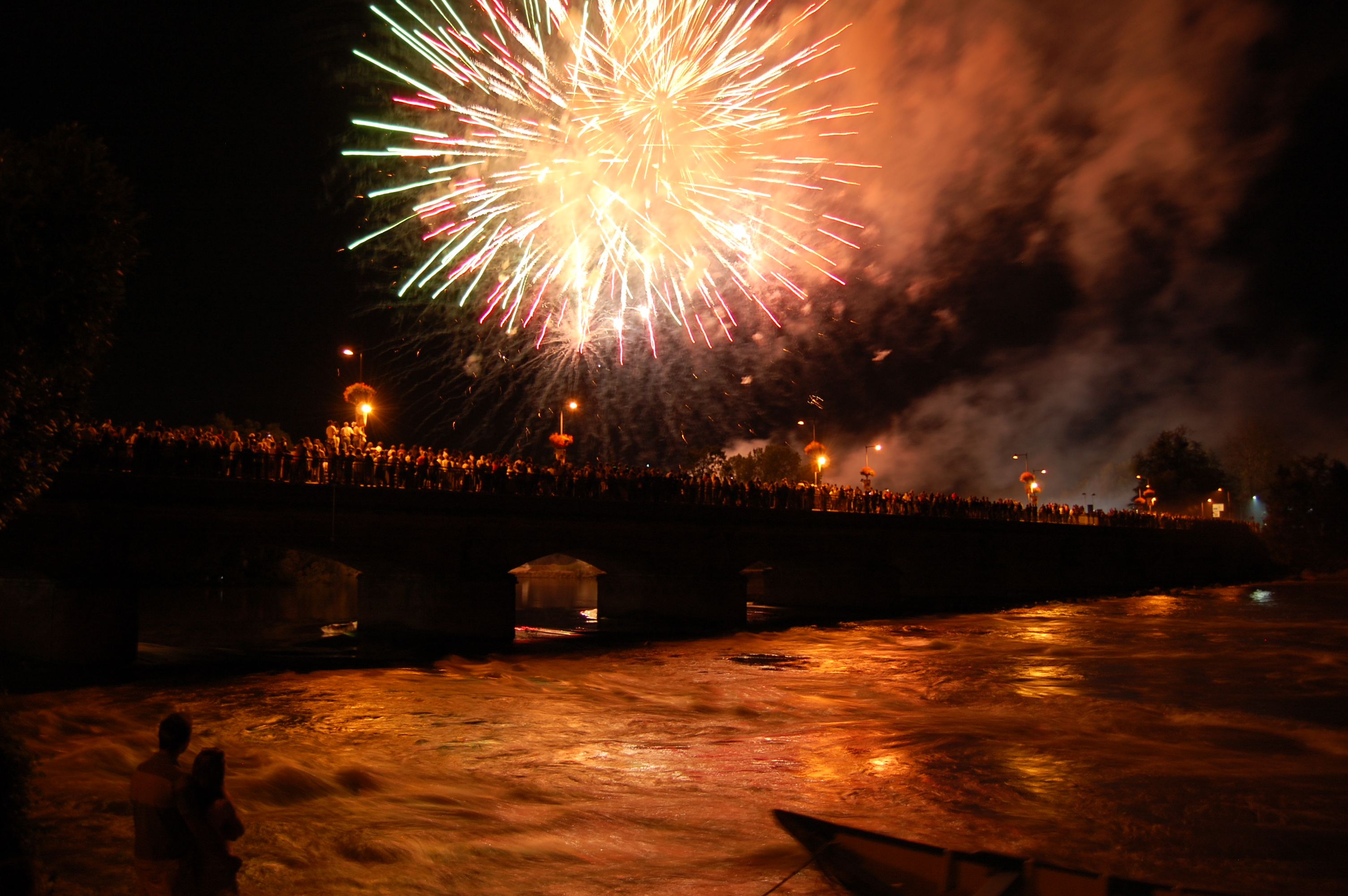
Spectators gathered on the bridge to watch the fireworks display during the opening evening of the 2009 Palio

Since 1986, the "Palio dei Rioni" has been held annually, a historical reenactment consisting of a series of challenges among the city's ancient neighborhoods. The Palio day begins in the Cathedral with a solemn Mass presided over by the bishop. Following a parade in traditional costumes, the "ring race" takes place, during which a jockey rides a wooden and iron horse and, pushed by two athletes, attempts to throw his javelin through four rings placed around the perimeter of Piazza della Vittoria in the shortest time possible. The event continues with the "cursa dei cavài" (Note: "Horse race" in Lodigiano dialect.), in which competitors must ride their horses three laps around the square, trying to be the first to reach the finish line located in front of the cathedral square. The winning neighborhood, determined by the rankings of the various events, receives "el bastón de san Bassan" (Note: "The staff of Saint Bassianus" in Lodigiano dialect.) from the hands of the city’s mayor. Occasionally, the final ranking is also determined by the outcomes of competitions held on the Adda River during the summer, including a contest for allegorical boats, a canoe race, and a "river bicycle" race. The Department for the Development and Competitiveness of Tourism has awarded the Lodi Palio the title of "Italy’s heritage for tradition", a recognition aimed at promoting the most significant folkloric events at the national level.

=== Museums ===
Lodi is home to several important museums, including the Civic Museum, the Paolo Gorini Anatomical Collection, the Natural Sciences Museum, the Incoronata Temple Treasure Museum, the Diocesan Museum of Sacred Art, and the Printing and Art Printing Museum.

== Education ==
=== Libraries ===
The Biblioteca Laudense has ancient origins and was opened to the public in 1792. Its historical section houses approximately 11,000 volumes, including incunabula, sixteenth-century books, illuminated manuscripts, and other manuscripts, as well as valuable prints and maps. The modern collection, on the other hand, consists of more than 135,000 volumes.

=== Universities and research ===
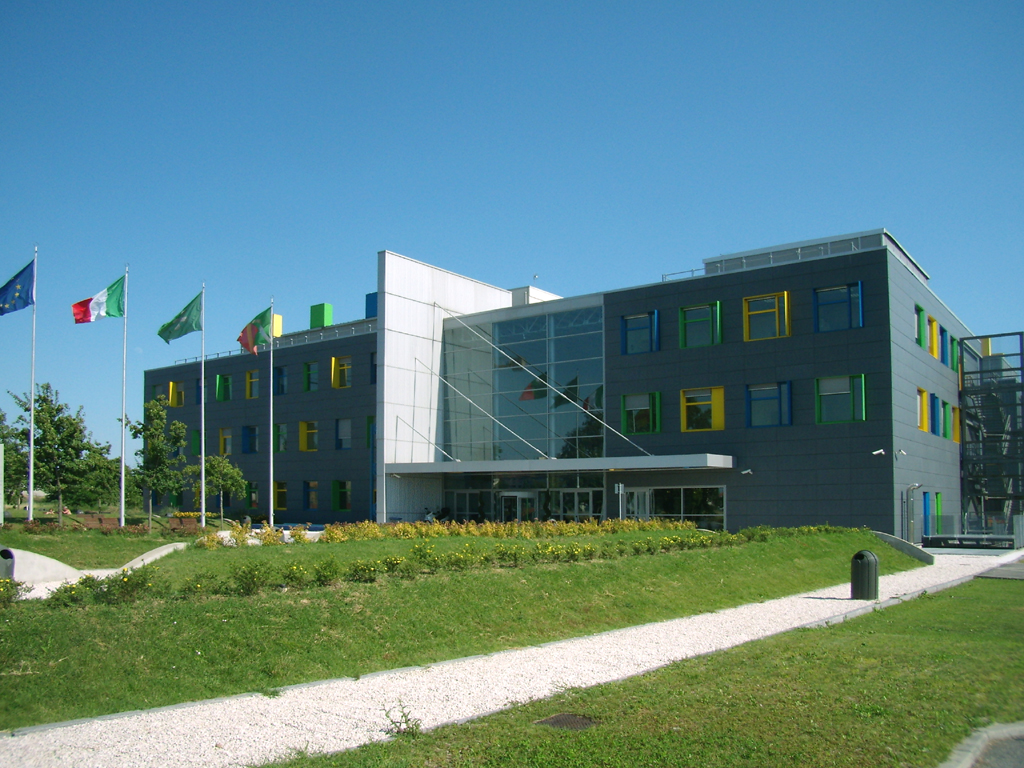
The entrance to the Parco Tecnologico Padano

Since 2005, Lodi has been home to a scientific-university hub, comprising the Parco Tecnologico Padano and some facilities of the University of Milan.

The Parco Tecnologico Padano is one of the most important research centers in Europe in the field of agri-food biotechnology.

The University of Milan’s hub includes the faculty of veterinary medicine, designed by the Japanese architect Kengo Kuma, alongside which are located an educational-experimental zootecnical center and a veterinary hospital comprising educational and clinical facilities for horses, cattle, pigs, sheep, goats, and companion animals. The city also is home to the Research Center for Forage and Dairy Productions, formed by the merger of the Experimental Institute for Forage Crops, directed from 1948 to 1976 by the renowned agronomist Giovanni Haussmann, with the Experimental Dairy Institute and the Experimental Institute for Dairy Cattle Husbandry.

Lodi is also home to a branch campus of the University of the Republic of San Marino.

=== Schools ===
The municipal territory is home to 17 kindergartens, 12 primary schools, 6 middle schools, 9 high schools, and 4 vocational training centers.

== Culture ==
=== Media ===
The city is home to the editorial office of the local daily newspaper Il Cittadino and a branch office of Telepace.

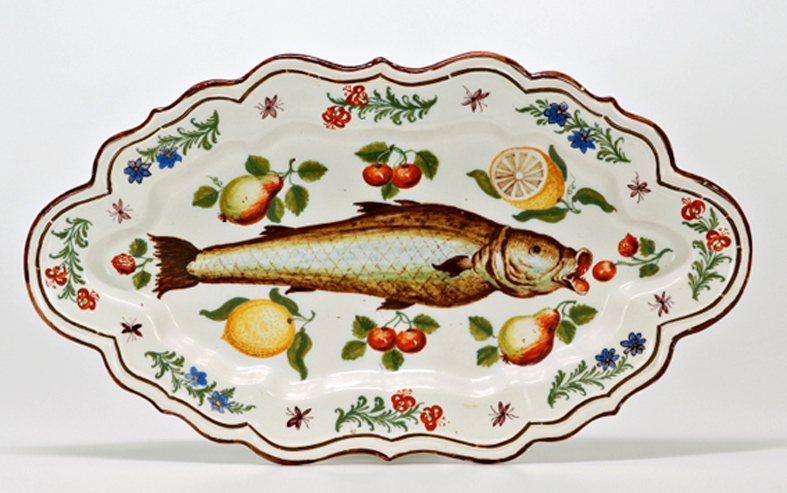
A majolica polychrome tray made in Lodi in the 18th century

=== Art ===
Lodi is renowned for its artistic ceramic production. Documented since the 15th century, this activity saw significant expansion in the 18th century with the Coppellotti, Rossetti, and Ferretti factories, and in the 19th century with the Dossena family. The main subjects, reproduced in turquoise monochrome and polychrome, include landscapes with ruins, still lifes, floral motifs, popular scenes, and chinoiserie. Contemporary Lodi artistic ceramic production, known as "Vecchia Lodi", focuses on revisiting the stylistic models of the Ferretti manufacture. Lodi is recognized among the "Cities of Ceramics – Traditional Artistic Ceramics", a designation proudly borne by its numerous artisan workshops.

In the 1950s, the city hosted two painting competitions: the "Città di Lodi" prize (1950) and the "Lodi and the World of Milk" contest (1956), held respectively during the second and fifth Milk Fair.

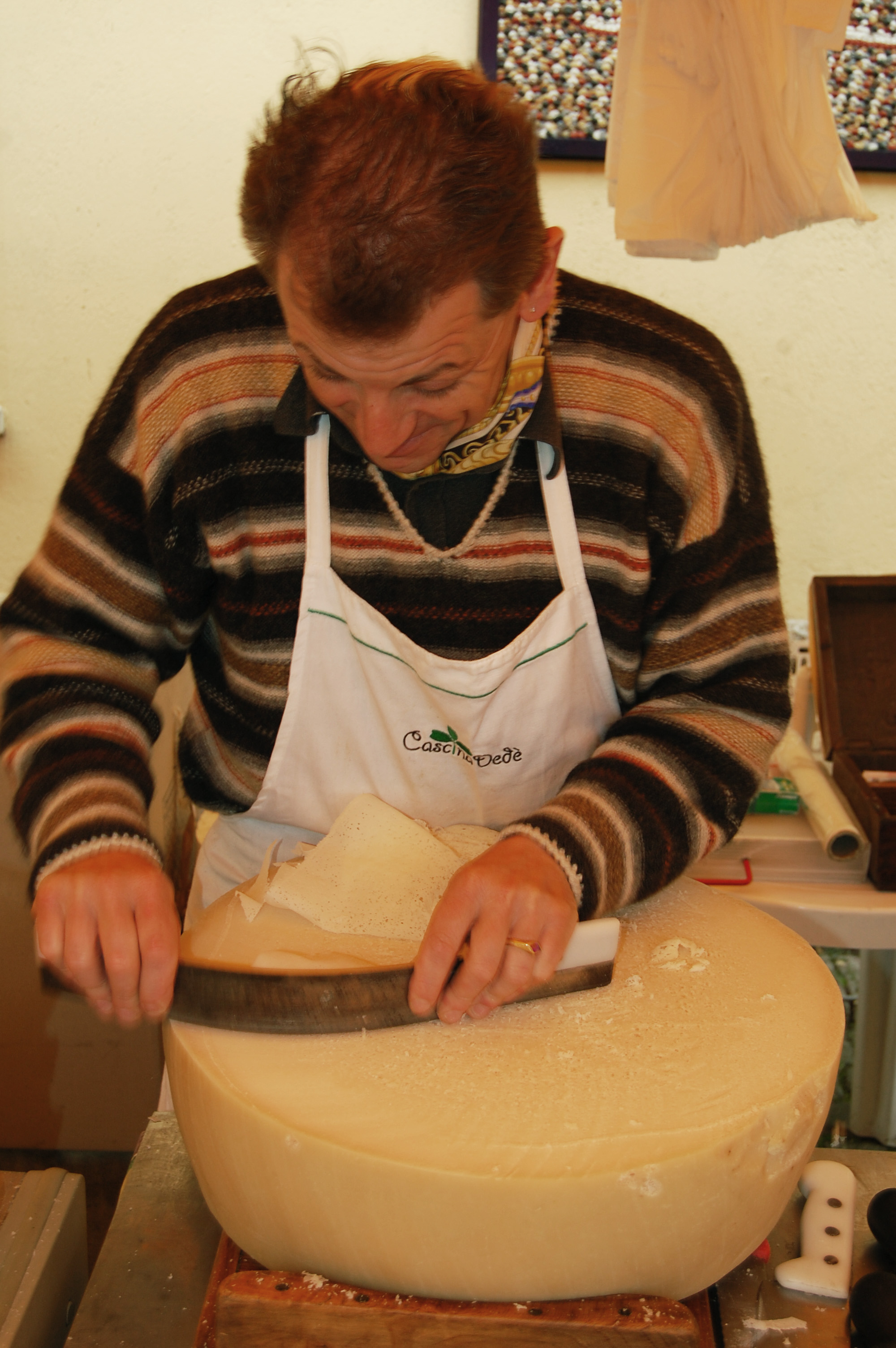
The preparation of raspadüra

=== Cuisine ===
The gastronomy of Lodi is primarily characterized by dairy products. The most renowned among the local cheeses is the Grana Padano PDO. Another version of grana cheese, called Tipico Lodigiano PAT, is produced, directly derived from the traditional processing of Granone Lodigiano, now extinct. This ancient product, considered the "progenitor" of all grana cheeses, had distinctive characteristics: its color was yellow due to the addition of saffron to the paste; moreover, as it was not pressed, it expelled whey during aging, forming the characteristic "tear". Fresh grana cheeses are cut in half and scraped with a special tool: this technique yields very thin flakes known as raspadüra. Other typically Lodi cheeses include mascarpone PAT and pannerone PAT, both made with cream. Frittate, soups, and salumi are other specialties; there are also numerous typical desserts, such as the Tortionata PAT, Amaretti Fanfullini, and Gnam-gnam.

=== Events ===
The "Festival of the Seven Deadly Sins", promoted by the municipality, consisted of seven editions held each spring from 2003 to 2009, attracting over 20,000 visitors for each event. Each of the seven editions featured cultural events, debates, exhibitions, and workshops dedicated to one of the seven deadly sins of Western philosophical tradition. In subsequent years, the event was replaced by the "Human Behaviors" festival (2010-2015) and the "Generating Future" festival (2016-2017).

Since 2010, the "Ethical Photography Festival" has been held every autumn in the city, one of the most significant documentary photography exhibitions on an international scale.

=== Traditions and folklore ===
==== The Feast of Saint Bassianus ====
On 19 January each year, the patronal feast of Saint Bassianus is celebrated. Religious celebrations begin the previous evening in the Cathedral, with a diocesan vigil presided over by the bishop. The actual feast day begins on the morning of 19 January with a procession of civic authorities from Palazzo Broletto to the Cathedral, accompanied by figures in medieval costumes; in the crypt, where the saint’s relics are kept, official speeches are delivered by the mayor and the bishop.

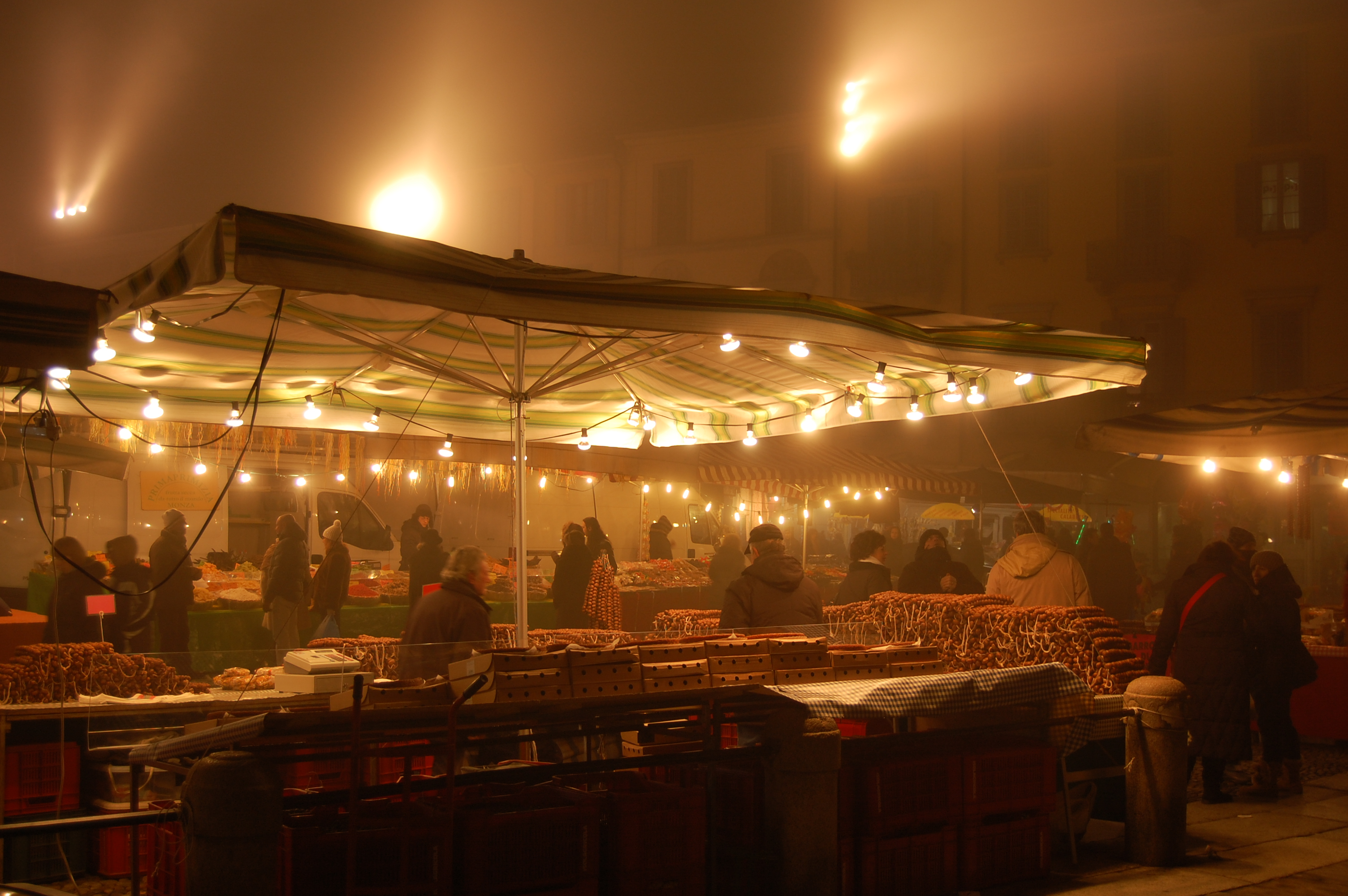
Vendors of the traditional "filsòn" (strings of boiled chestnuts) during the Saint Bassianus fair

After the solemn mass, under the porticos of Palazzo Broletto, the free distribution of büšèca (Lombard-style tripe cooked with pancetta, vegetables, and beans), hot tea, and mulled wine takes place; simultaneously, throughout the day, the traditional Saint Bassianus fair is held in Piazza della Vittoria. In the afternoon, after the celebration of vespers, the ceremony for the awarding of civic honors and the "Fanfullino della riconoscenza" prize takes place, given to Lodi citizens distinguished in the fields of social commitment and cultural or scientific promotion.

==== The Feast of Saint Lucia ====
Lodi is one of the northern Italian cities where Saint Lucia is venerated as a bringer of gifts: according to tradition, in the days leading up to the 13 December feast, children list their desired gifts in a letter, which must then be placed in an urn set up for the occasion in the Cathedral, at the foot of the saint’s statue. Preparations for the feast begin in one of the first afternoons of the month, when the city hosts the "Saint Lucia vigil", an event dedicated to primary and kindergarten-age children. Additionally, from 8 December (Note: Sometimes from 7 December.) to midnight on 12 December, the ancient Saint Lucia fair is held in Piazza della Vittoria, with stalls selling toys, sweets, and handicrafts.

== Urbanism ==
In the early centuries of the city’s existence, urban development progressed slowly: the construction of the Cathedral, begun between 1158 and 1160, was completed over a hundred years later, excluding subsequent modifications; at the end of the 12th century, the San Lorenzo Church was built, while the San Francesco Church and the initial core of the Broletto Palace date back to the late 13th century. The following century left behind the Vistarini Palace, the Castle, and the Sant’Agnese Church. In the late 15th century, remembered as the period of the city’s greatest splendor, numerous new buildings were erected, including the Mozzanica Palace, the Ospedale Maggiore, and the Civic Temple of the Incoronata; during the same period, the defensive fortification system dating back to the early 13th century was strengthened. Between the 16th and early 18th centuries, the San Cristoforo Complex and the Modignani Palace were built.

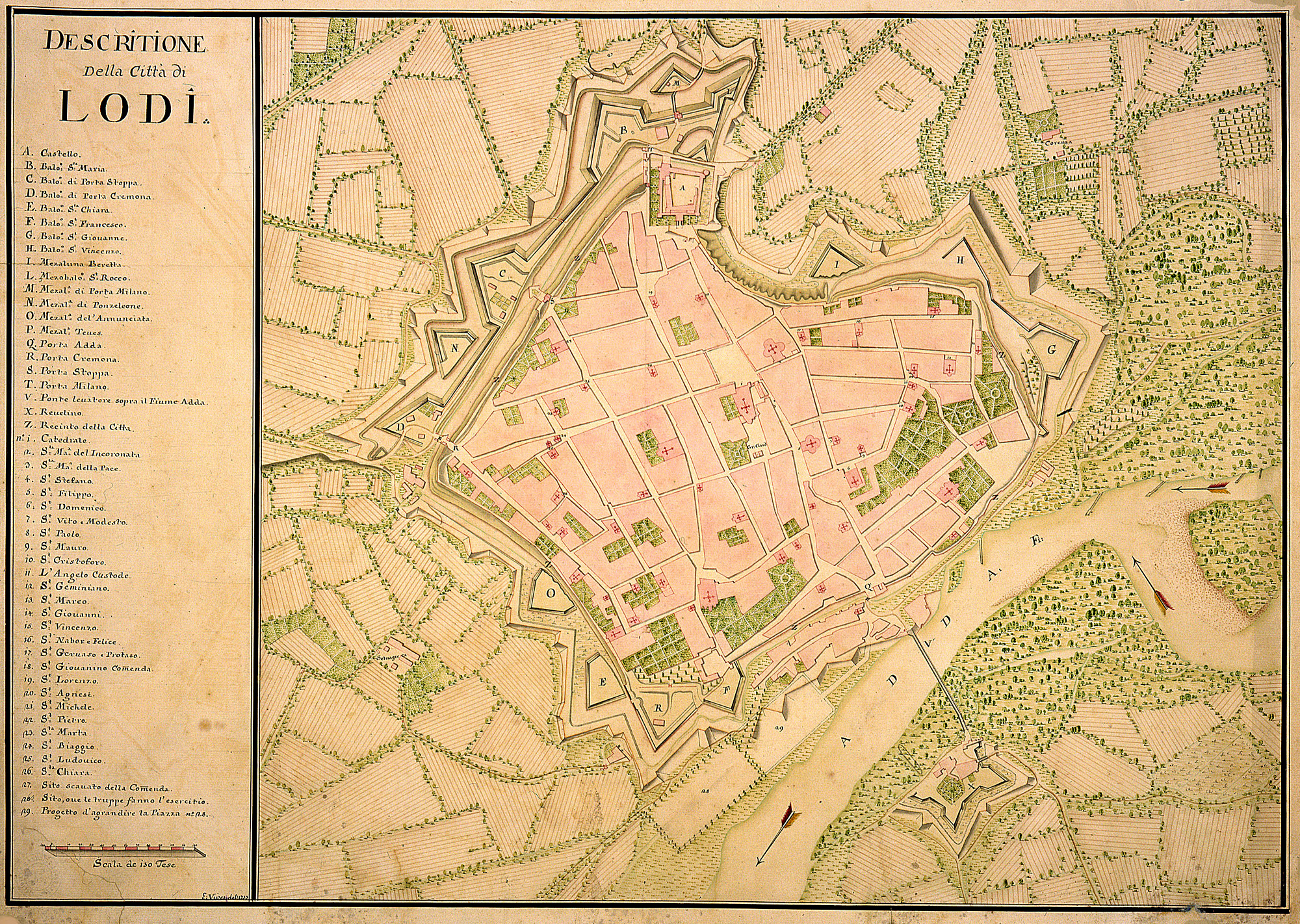
Map of the city in 1753

However, the current appearance of the historic center is largely due to the works carried out between the 18th and 19th centuries, which altered the original urban structure of Lodi’s ancient medieval core. During the Austrian period, in particular, a robust economic recovery led to significant construction development, transforming the city’s appearance in the style of late Baroque architecture: new churches, including Santa Maria del Sole, Santa Maria Maddalena, and San Filippo, were built, while the Episcopal Palace was completely renovated. Numerous monasteries and minor religious buildings were deconsecrated and, in some cases, demolished to make way for new private residences; the main streets were also widened by removing guard stones and demolishing porticos. During the same period, the first two suburban cemeteries of Riolo and San Fereolo were established. The bastions built during the Spanish domination of the 17th century were also demolished; in their place, a 3,700 m (12,100 ft) ring road was designed, connecting all the city gates, which had served as customs barriers for centuries. In 1835, the southern segment of the ring road was transformed into a "public promenade".

By the mid-19th century, Lodi’s urban area was still entirely enclosed within the medieval walls; outside the perimeter of the walled city, in addition to numerous farmsteads (Note: Rural settlements were typically located at the hydraulic nodes formed by the network of irrigation ditches watering the territory.), there were some hamlets (San Grato, San Fereolo, and San Bernardo), situated at the intersections of regional and local roads, at distances ranging from 2 to 5 km from the city center. This complex urban layout was altered in 1861 with the opening of the Milan-Bologna railway line, which passed through Lodi along the southern edge of the inhabited area: the railway track became the main obstacle when, in the following decades, the city began to slowly expand into the areas adjacent to the ring of the walls.

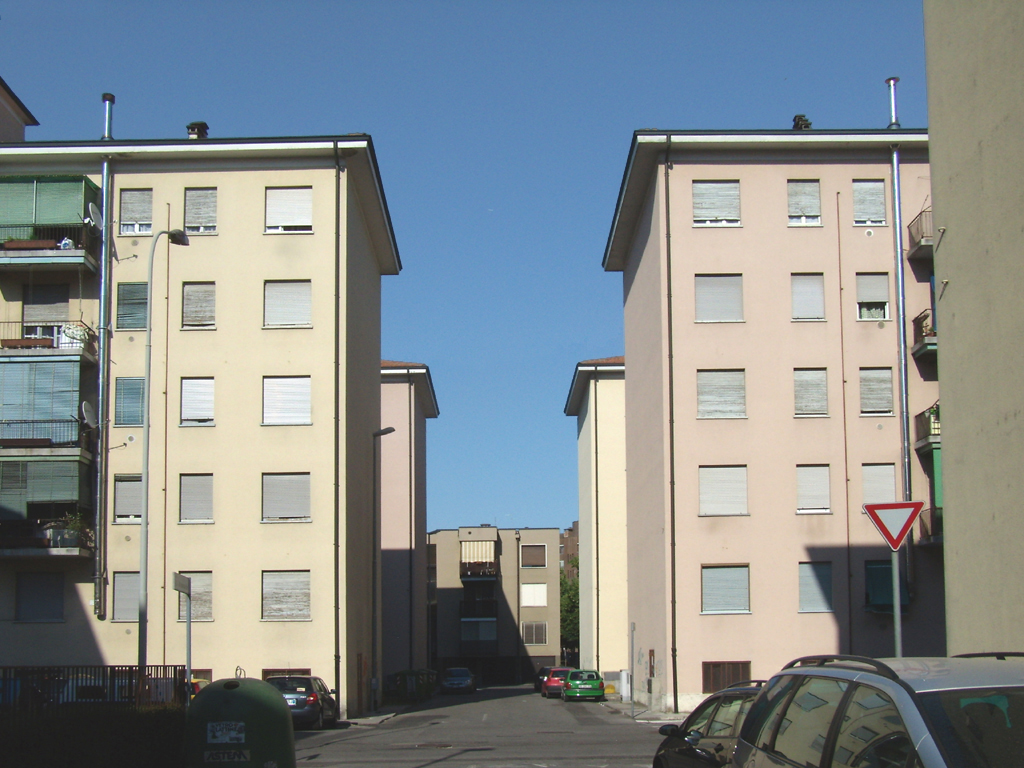
Public housing built in the "Oliva village", named after the mayor of the time (1951)

Between 1864 and the early 20th century, numerous urban interventions were carried out: regarding the two cemeteries in Riolo and San Fereolo, the former was expanded, and the latter was closed; in 1886, the construction of the Monumental Cemetery (better known as "Maggiore") began. Regarding the road network, the most significant works included the construction of the new Adda bridge in masonry, the redevelopment of the Piazza della Vittoria area, the expansion of Piazza Ospitale, and the creation of a road axis between the railway station and the historic center, with the opening of Viale Dante and Piazza Castello. In terms of infrastructure, in 1880, four steam interurban trams were inaugurated: the Milan-Lodi, the Lodi-Treviglio-Bergamo, the Lodi-Sant’Angelo, and the Lodi-Crema-Soncino. During the same period, rapid urbanization occurred in the quadrilateral between the public promenade and the railway: alongside some industrial settlements, the first batch of public housing was built in 1904. Simultaneously, further south, the first large industrial complexes emerged: the National Hemp and Flax Mill in the San Fereolo area and the Lodi Mechanical Workshops in the Camolina locality.

After a phase of moderate growth between the 1920s and World War II, from 1955, the city’s development accelerated and began to involve both banks of the Adda: new neighborhoods were created, including the "Fanfani houses" (west of the historic center) and the "Oliva village" (southwest), both built under the INA-Casa plan. Between the 1970s and 2000s, in addition to the completion of a system of ring roads, much of the industrial building stock was decommissioned and converted into new residential areas.

== Economy ==
=== Agriculture and livestock ===
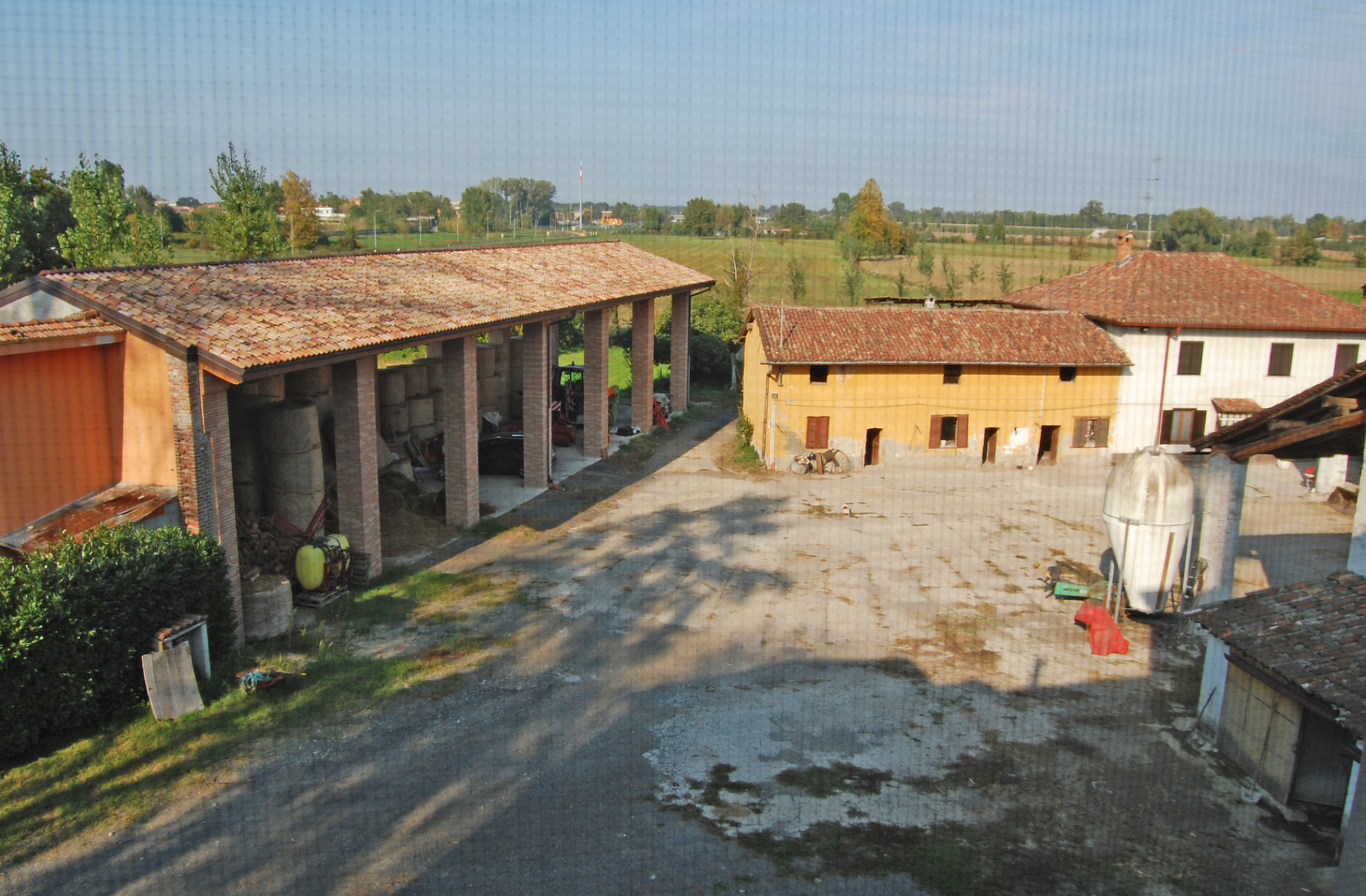
A farmstead located at the city’s outskirts

Agriculture and livestock have been of fundamental importance to Lodi and its territory since the Middle Ages. As evidence of the ongoing significance of the primary sector, data (Note: Related to the fifth general agriculture census of October 2000.) indicate 1,786 farms in the province producing mainly maize (47% of the utilized agricultural area) and forage (24% of the UAA). In the municipal territory, there are 84 farms, and the utilized agricultural area consists of 2,130 ha (5,300 acres), of which 48% is cultivated with maize; additionally, there are 5,495 head of cattle and 23,362 head of pigs.

To ensure and promote the excellence of the sector, as well as to protect the environment, animal welfare, and consumer health, the "Lodigiano Terra Buona" brand committee was established in 2004.

=== Industry and crafts ===
The first industrial plants established in Lodi were related to the processing of primary sector products: the Lanificio Varesi (1868), the Polenghi Lombardo, the first Italian company to fully process milk (1870), the Officine Sordi, which built machinery for the dairy sector (1881), and the Linificio Canapificio Nazionale (1909). Among other industries in the city, the mechanical sector was particularly developed: for example, the Lodi Mechanical Workshops (1908), the Officine Meccaniche Folli-Gay (1922), the Officine Curioni (1925), and the Officine Elettromeccaniche Adda (1926) were active. The latter were acquired in the 1980s by ABB, which in 1994 transferred its global center for the construction of transformers, high-voltage circuit breakers, and electrical substations to Lodi; in 2016, the company employed about 230 people.

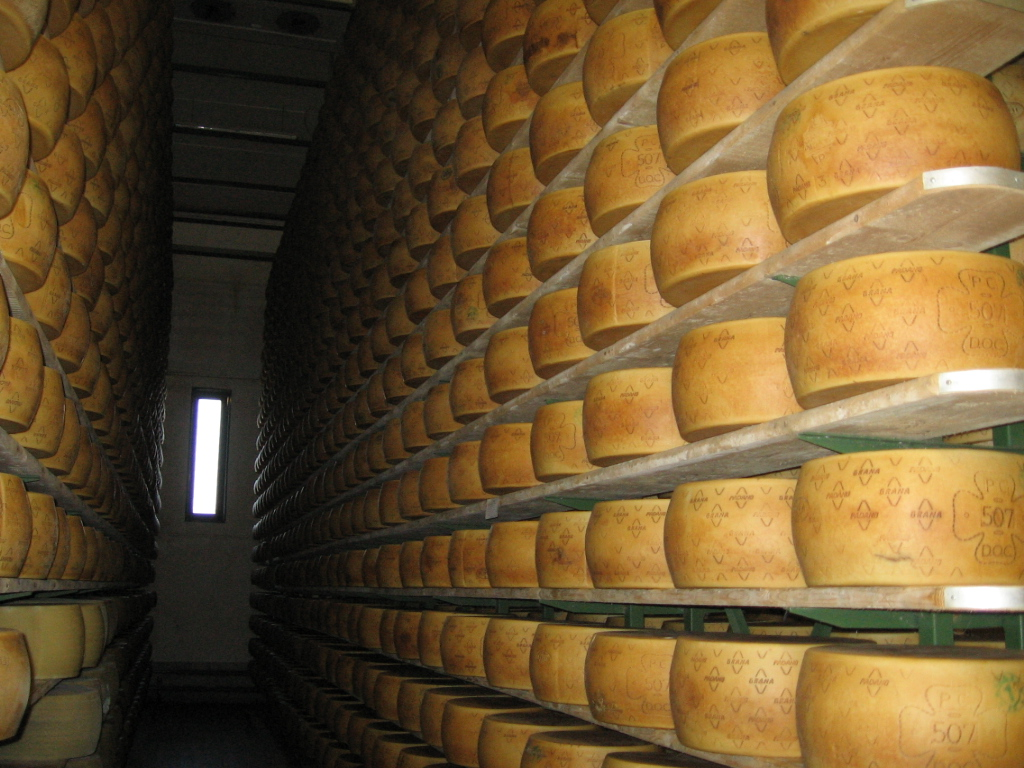
The Lodi area is one of the production areas of Grana Padano

In 1944, methane began to be extracted from the wells of nearby Caviaga, and its applications were tested at the local Agip research center. The six-legged dog, the company’s logo, is said to be inspired by the mythical dragon Tarantasio that allegedly haunted Gerundo Lake: when methane was discovered in those areas, it was imagined that the creature, once the guardian of the marshes and then disappeared underground after their reclamation, had reappeared in the form of gas. Lodi was the first city in Italy to use methane for domestic and industrial purposes. In the petrochemical industry, since 1963, Itelyum has been based in Lodi, specializing in the recycling of used motor oil through a refining process. In 2007, the company had a turnover of 100 million euros and employed 170 people.

At the border of Lodi’s municipal territory, in an area under the jurisdiction of the municipalities of Montanaso Lombardo and Tavazzano con Villavesco, stands a large thermal power plant owned by EPH, powered by natural gas. The plant, with an installed capacity of 1,740 MW (2,330,000 hp), is one of the most important in Italy and employed 73 people in 2019. The initial core, built in 1952 as part of the Marshall Plan, was inaugurated by Enrico Mattei and the Prime Minister Alcide De Gasperi; the current facilities were activated in stages between 2002 and 2010. The plant draws cooling water from the Muzza Canal, the Belgiardino Canal, and the Adda River.

Today, the most developed industries are the dairy industry (the Lodi area is one of the 14 areas where Grana Padano production is concentrated) and artisanal crafts, particularly in the ceramics and cosmetics sectors (L’Erbolario).

=== Services ===
Among the most important companies in the service sector is Zucchetti, which operates in the software and hardware industry; with approximately 7,000 employees, of which 1,300 are in Lodi, and a turnover exceeding one billion euros, it is one of Italy’s leading companies in the IT field.

Lodi also has significant banking activity: the Banca Popolare di Lodi, founded by the activist Tiziano Zalli in 1864, was the first cooperative bank established in Italy. Since 2007, it has been part of the Banco Popolare group (later Banco BPM), the third largest banking group in Italy.

In 1997, Lodi was one of the first cities to be wired with optical fiber as part of Telecom Italia’s Socrates project, aimed at creating a network for cable television and data transmission.

At the beginning of the 21st century, before the Great Recession, the city experienced significant economic growth due to the revival of commercial activities, the expansion of the ring road system, and the development of environmental technologies (thanks to the significant portion of recyclable waste produced by the people of Lodi and district heating technology).

=== Tourism ===
Lodi was part of the art cities circuit of the Po Valley from 1999 until 2018, when the organization was dissolved. Since the 2000s, tourism has been a rapidly expanding sector in the area: in 2006, 137,000 arrivals were recorded, a 116% increase compared to three years earlier.

In addition to cultural tourism, naturalistic tourism is particularly significant, thanks to the efficient cycling network that extends from the capital throughout the territory. Food and wine tourism is particularly concentrated between October and December, during which, since 1988, the "Lodi Gastronomic Festival" is held.

== Transport ==
=== Roads ===
Lodi is a regional road hub: the city is served by the State Road 9 Via Emilia and numerous provincial roads, including the former SS 235 Pavia-Brescia and the former SS 472 Treviglio-Lodi. The roads converging on the city are connected by the South and East ring roads, forming a semi-ring (interrupted in the northwest sector) with dual carriageway characteristics.

The Autostrada del Sole also passes nearby; the "Lodi" exit, located in the municipal territory of Pieve Fissiraga, is 6 km southwest of the city.

=== Railways and trams ===
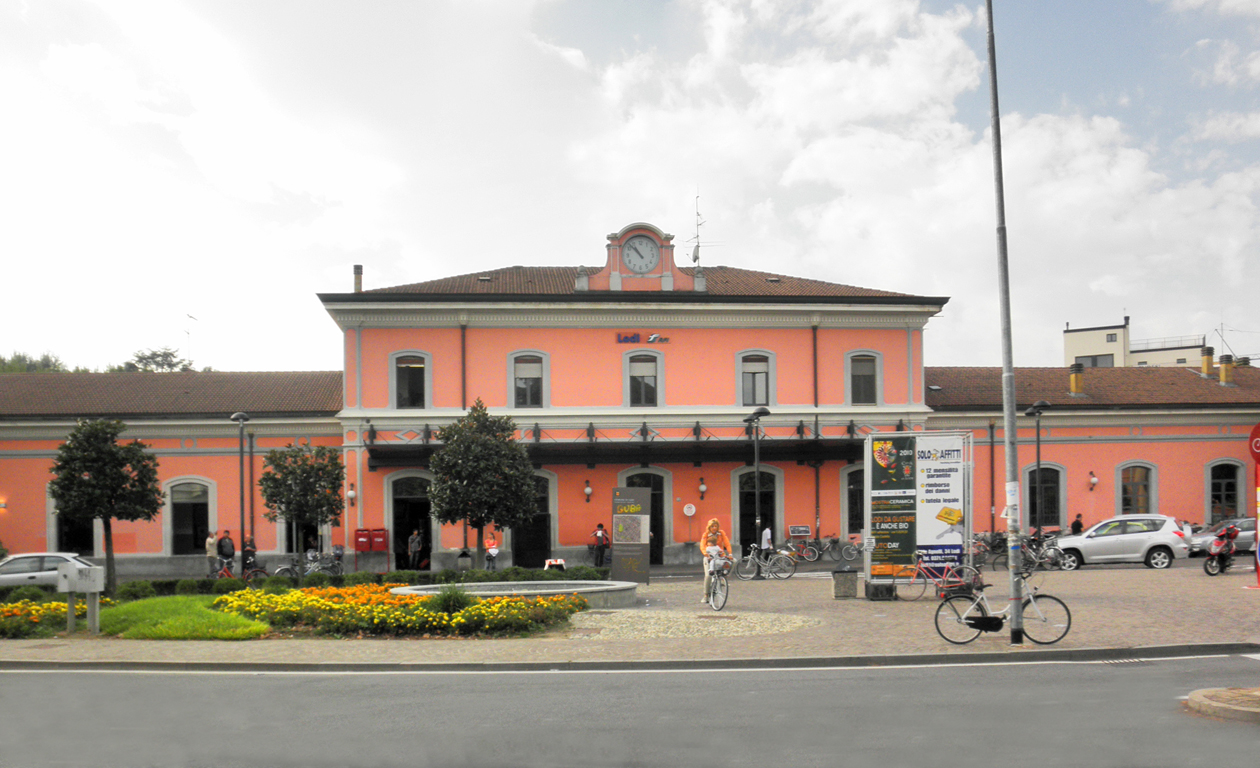
The Lodi railway station is located near the city’s historic center

The Lodi railway station is situated on the Milan-Bologna railway and is primarily served by suburban, regional (Milan-Piacenza), and fast regional (Milan-Bologna and Milan-Mantua) trains operated by Trenord and TPER, as well as some long-distance services run by Trenitalia. Most of the traffic consists of commuters traveling to the capital of Lombardy; the station serves a wide catchment area, including travelers from nearby towns and the Cremasque area.

Between 1880 and the early decades of the 20th century, Lodi was the center of an extensive network of interurban trams, including the Milan-Lodi, Lodi-Treviglio-Bergamo, Lodi-Sant’Angelo, and Lodi-Crema-Soncino lines, connecting the city with the main capitals of Lombardy.

=== Buses ===
The city has an urban bus network managed by the company STAR Mobility, which provides service through seven lines.

The STAR company (Note: "STAR" stands for "Società Trasporti Automobilistici Regionali".), based in Lodi since 1922, also manages numerous interurban lines and connections with the main regional centers.

== International relations ==
=== Twin towns - sister cities ===
- (Italy) Omegna, since 1980;
- (Germany) Konstanz, since 1986;
- (United States) Lodi, since 1987;
- (Germany) Flossenbürg, since 1999;
- (France) Fontainebleau, since 2011;
- (Italy) San Bassano, since 2023.

== Sport ==
The sports scene in Lodi is diverse. Lodi's sports clubs and athletes have achieved titles at both national and international levels.

The most popular sport by tradition is roller hockey. The city's leading team, Amatori Lodi, has won four scudetti, four Coppe Italia, two Supercoppe Italiane, one Coppa di Lega, one Cup Winners' Cup, and one WSE Cup. However, the most widely practiced sport remains football. The Lodi-based club A.S. Fanfulla was a prominent participant in the Serie B championship during the 1930s and 1950s, and later won a Coppa Italia Serie C in 1984.

The city is equipped with numerous sports facilities, including the Stadio Dossenina and the PalaCastellotti.

== Notable people ==
- Antonio Allegri, (1916-2005) medical doctor and mayor
- Elena Cazzulani (1920-2007), novelist
- Eugenio Castellotti (1930-1957), racing driver
- Michele Bartyan (1980), racing driver
- Marco Dolci (1987), robotics systems engineer on Mars missions at NASA Jet Propulsion Laboratory in Pasadena, CA.
- Sandro Tonali (2000), professional footballer who plays as a midfielder for club Tottenham Hotspur and the Italy national team.

== Gallery ==
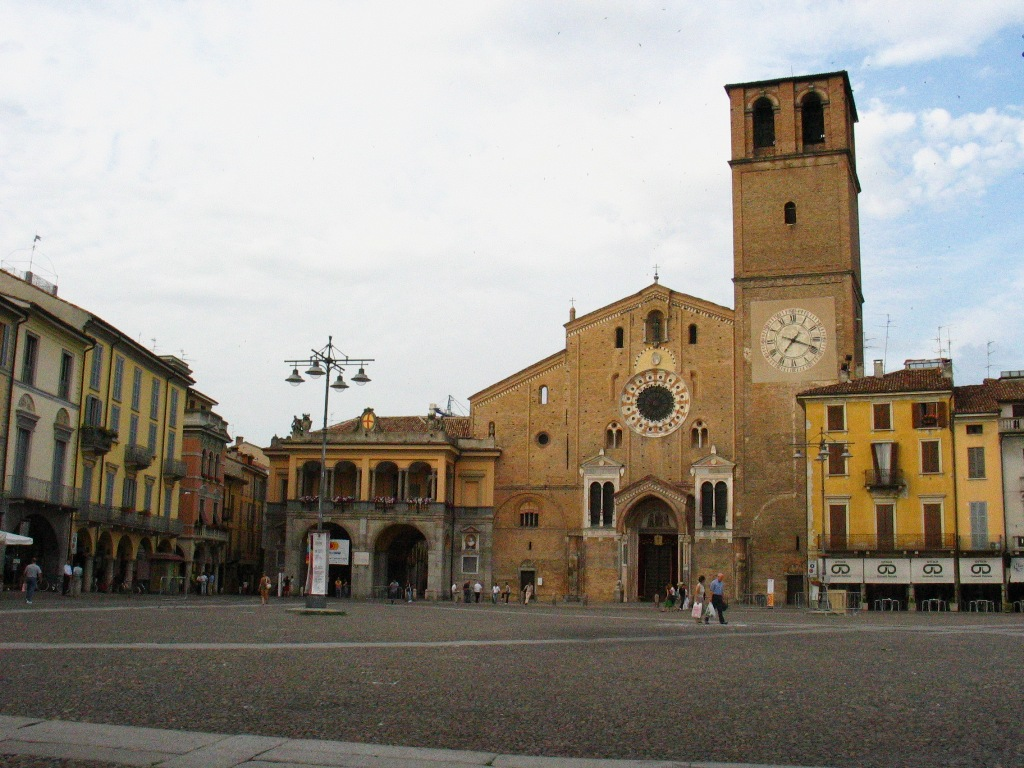
The façade of Lodi Cathedral and Piazza della Vittoria

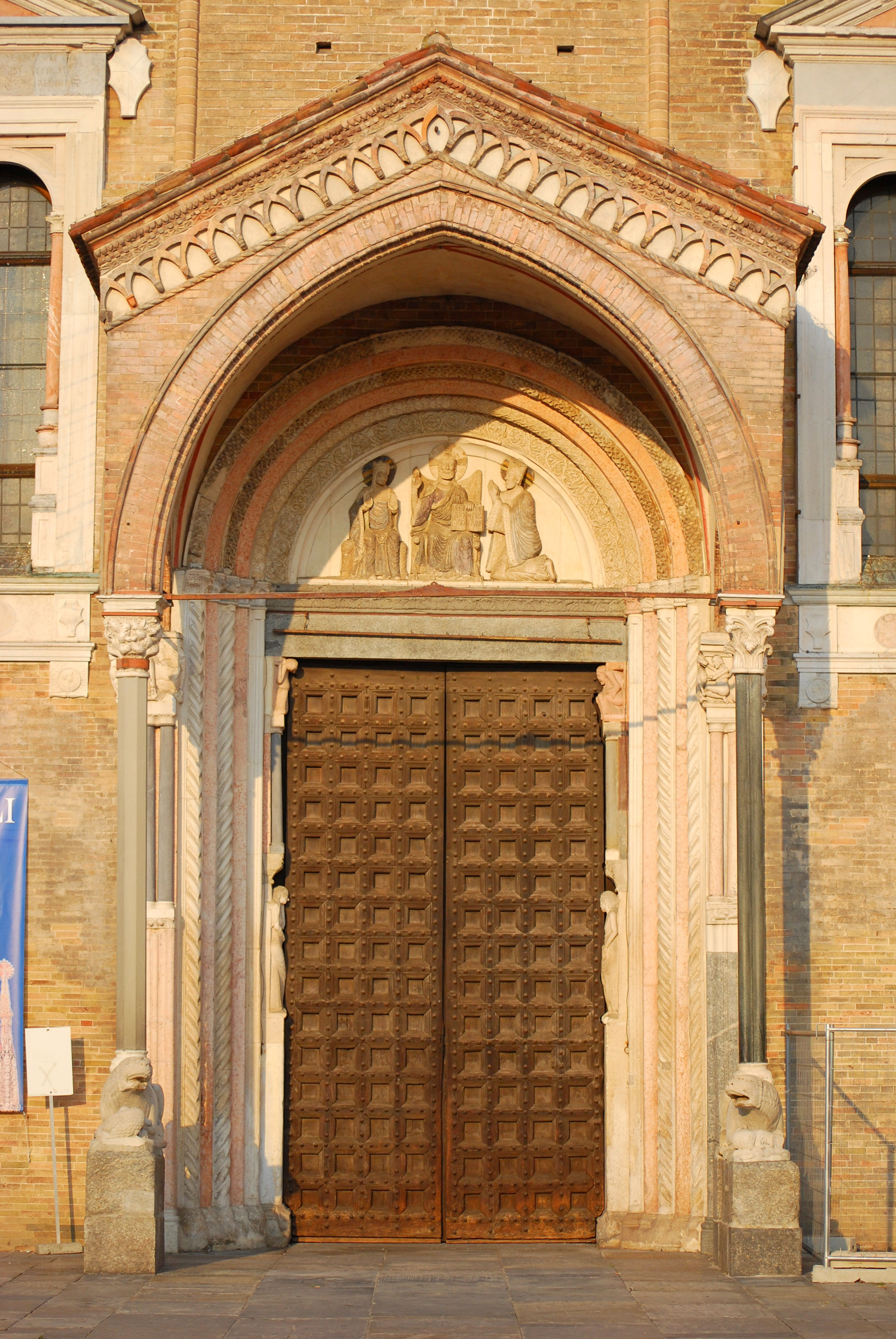
Prothyrum of Lodi Cathedral

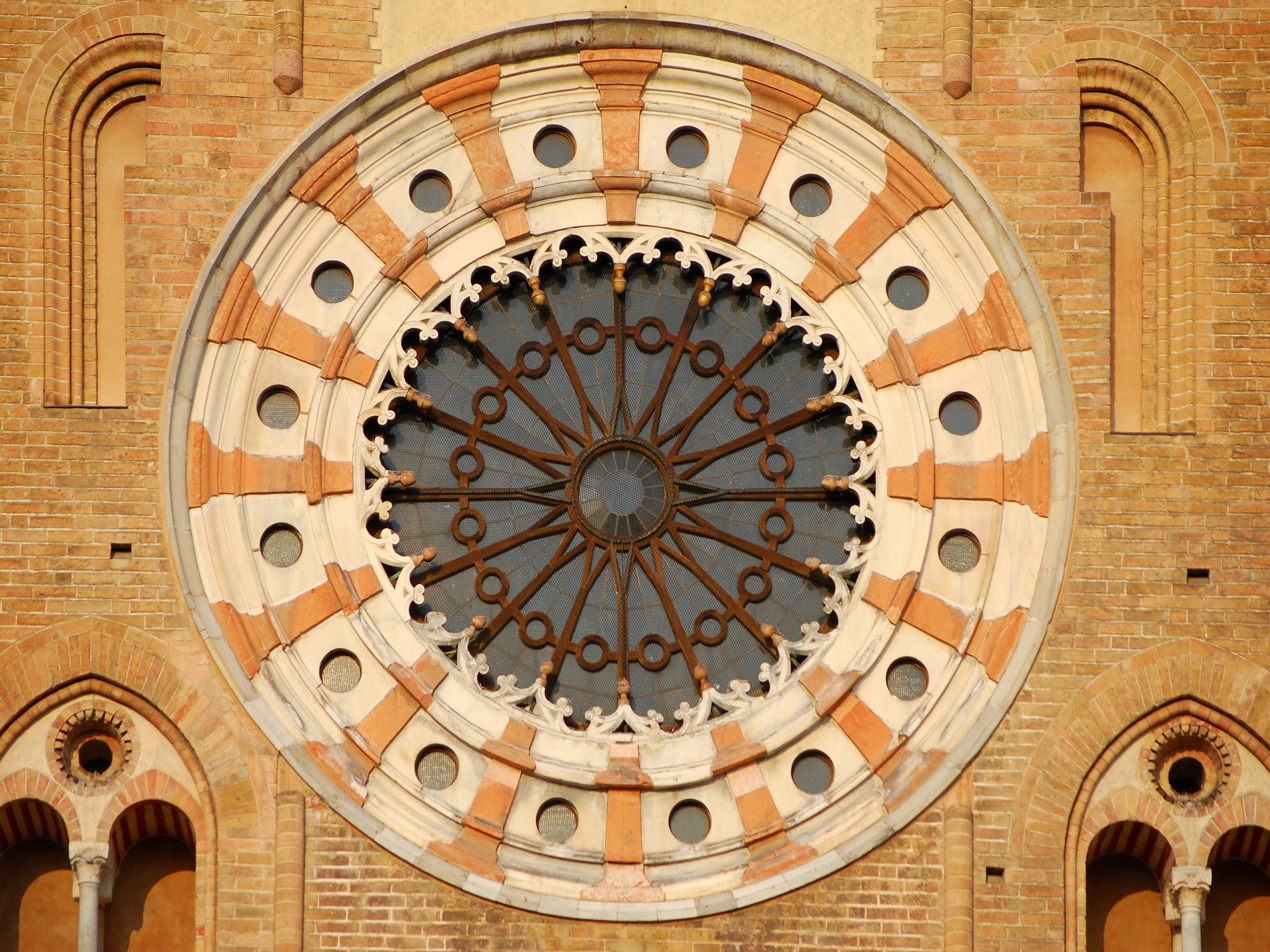
Rose window of Lodi Cathedral

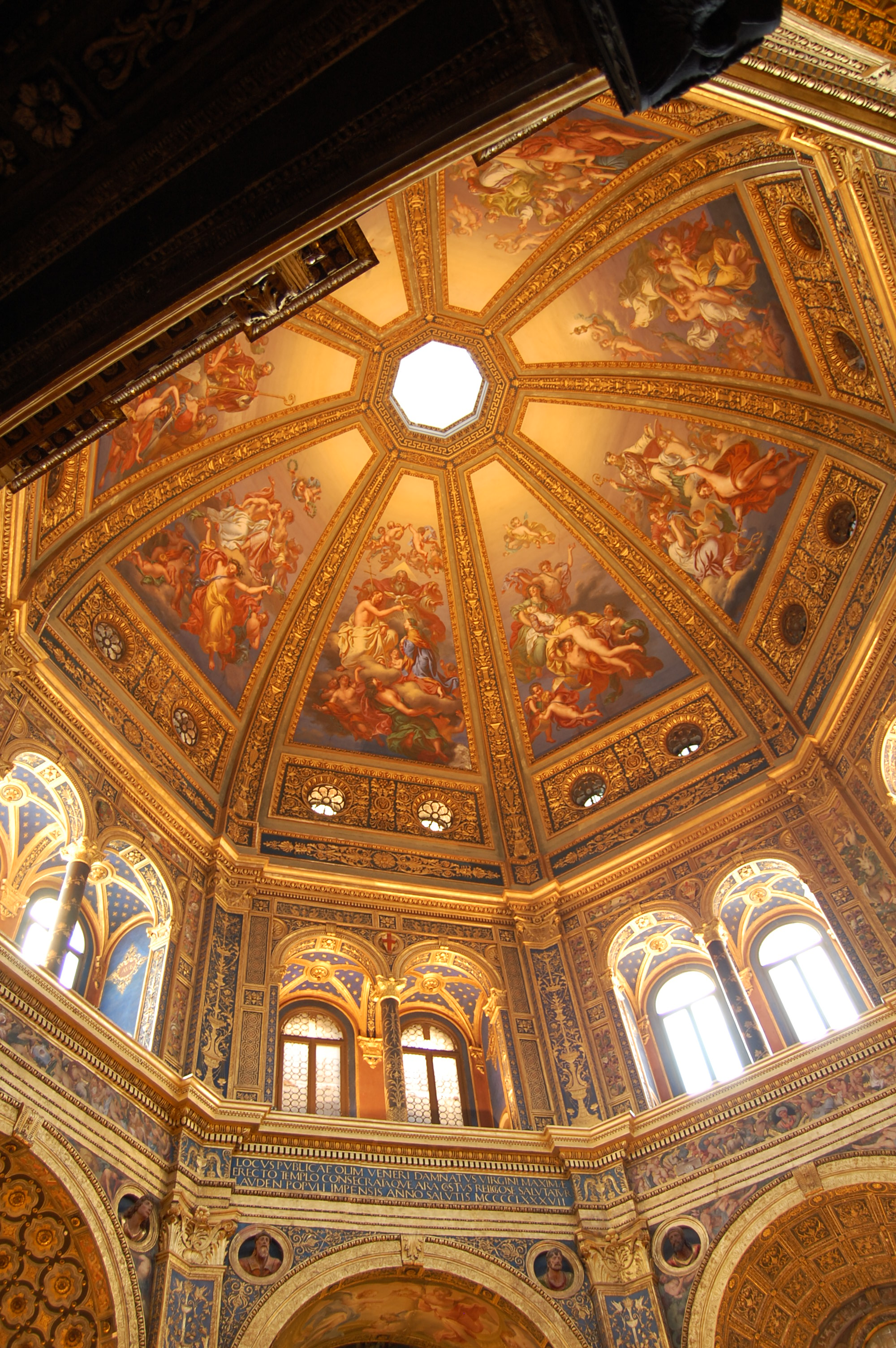
Church of the Beata Vergine Incoronata (view of the interior and dome)

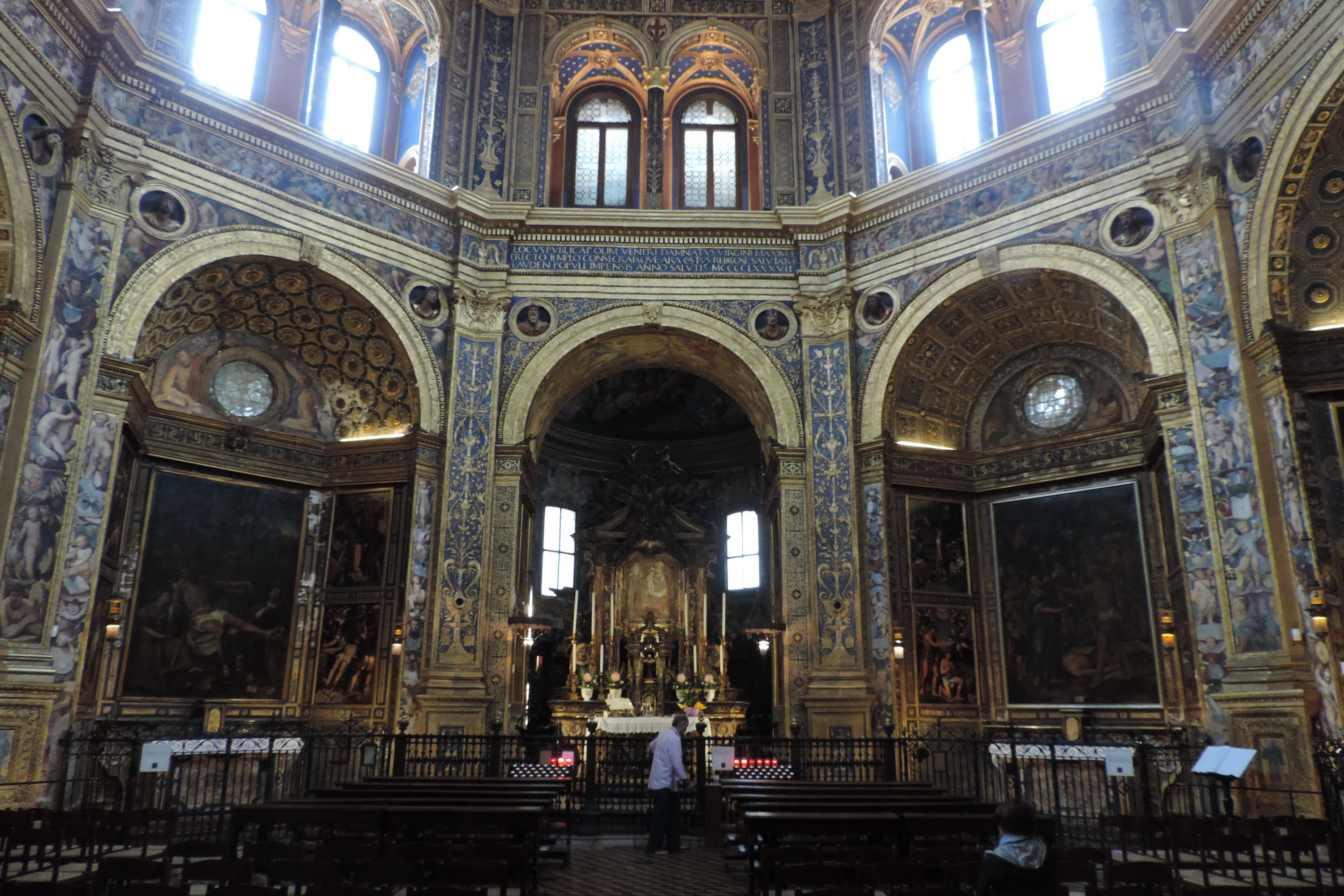
Interior of Church of Beata Vergine Incoronata

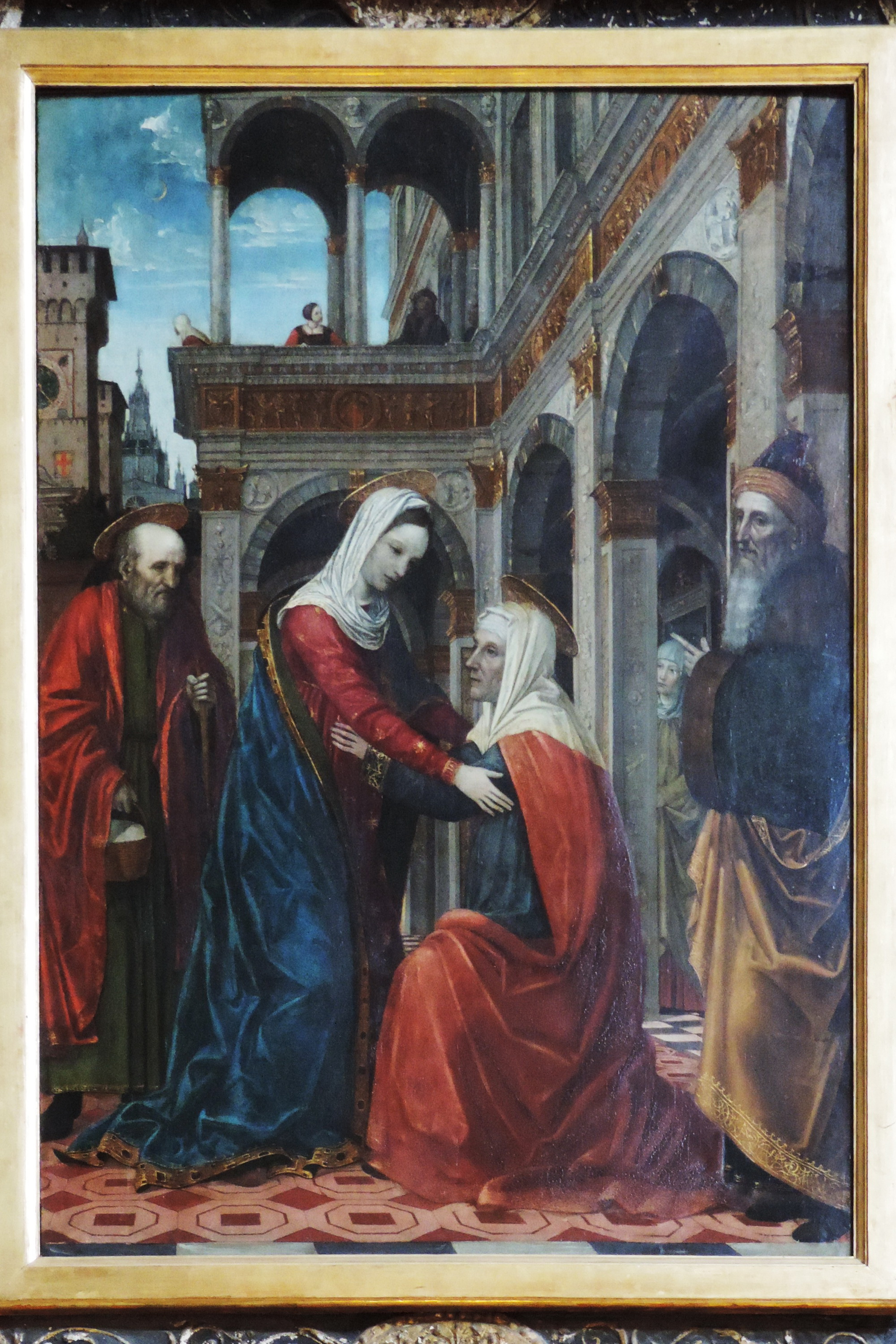
Painting by Bergognone representing the Visitation in the Church of Beata Vergine Incoronata

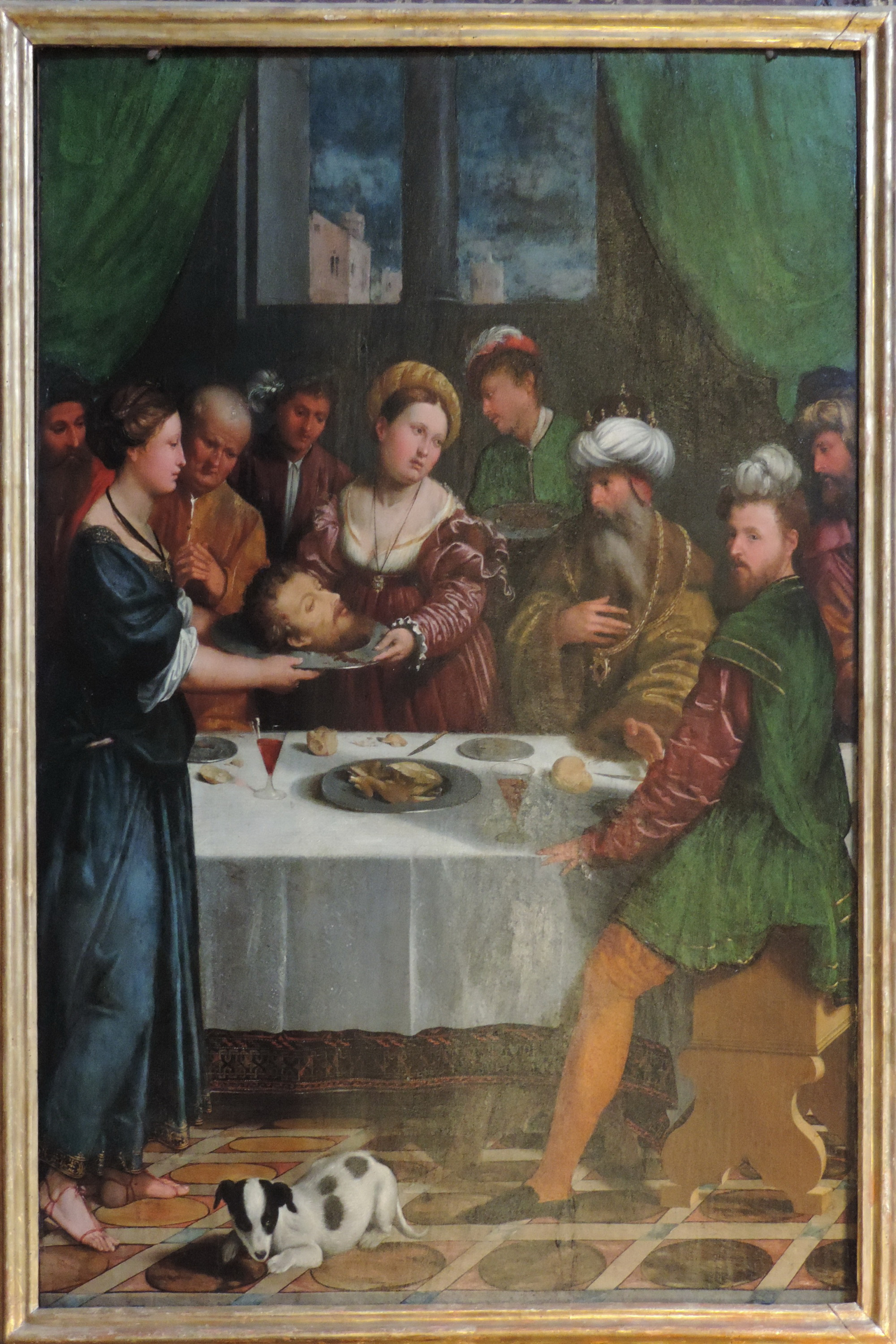
Painting by Callisto Piazza representing Salome presenting the head of Saint John the Baptist to Herod II

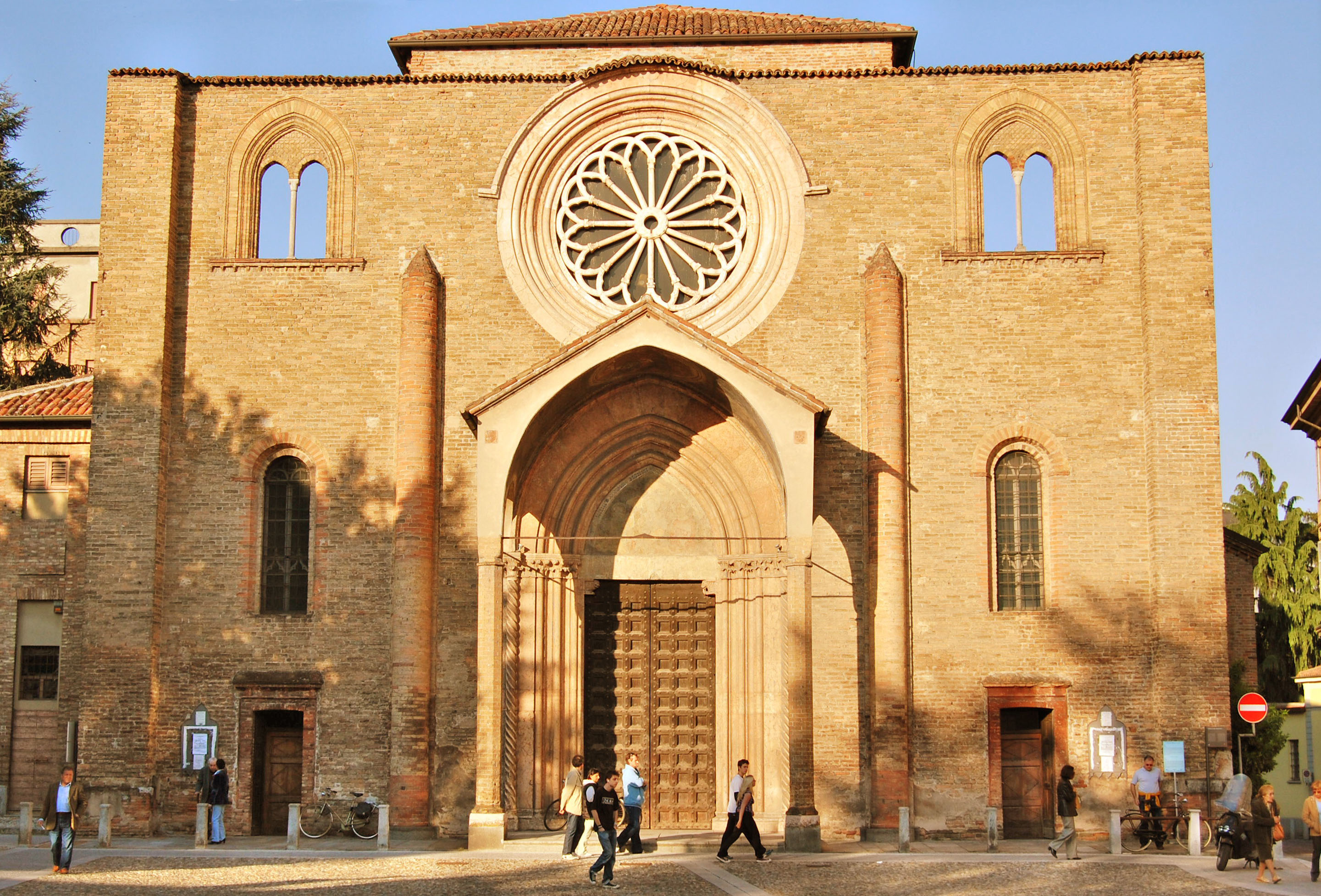
Façade of San Francesco Church

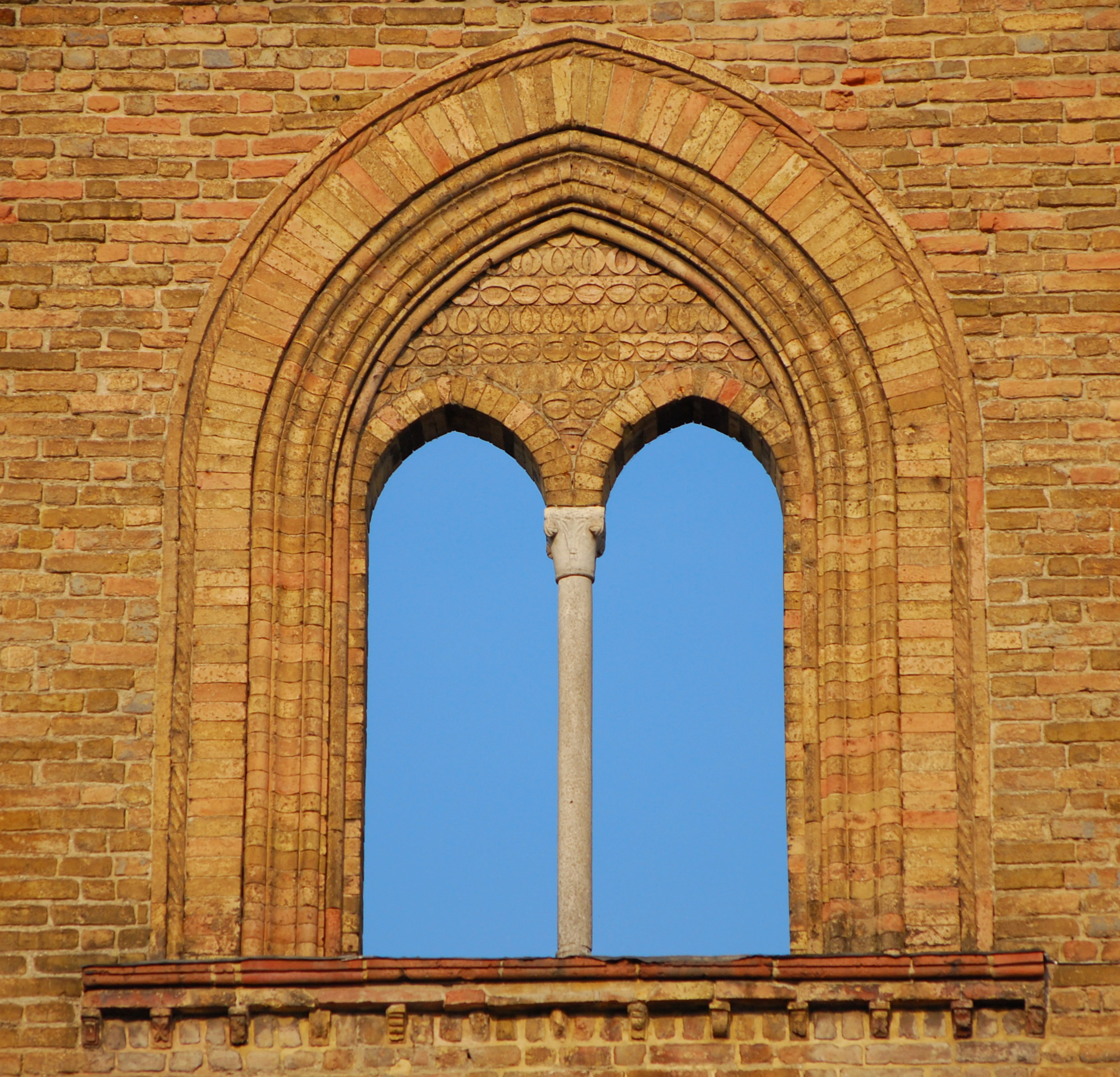
Open sky bifora in the façade of San Francesco Church

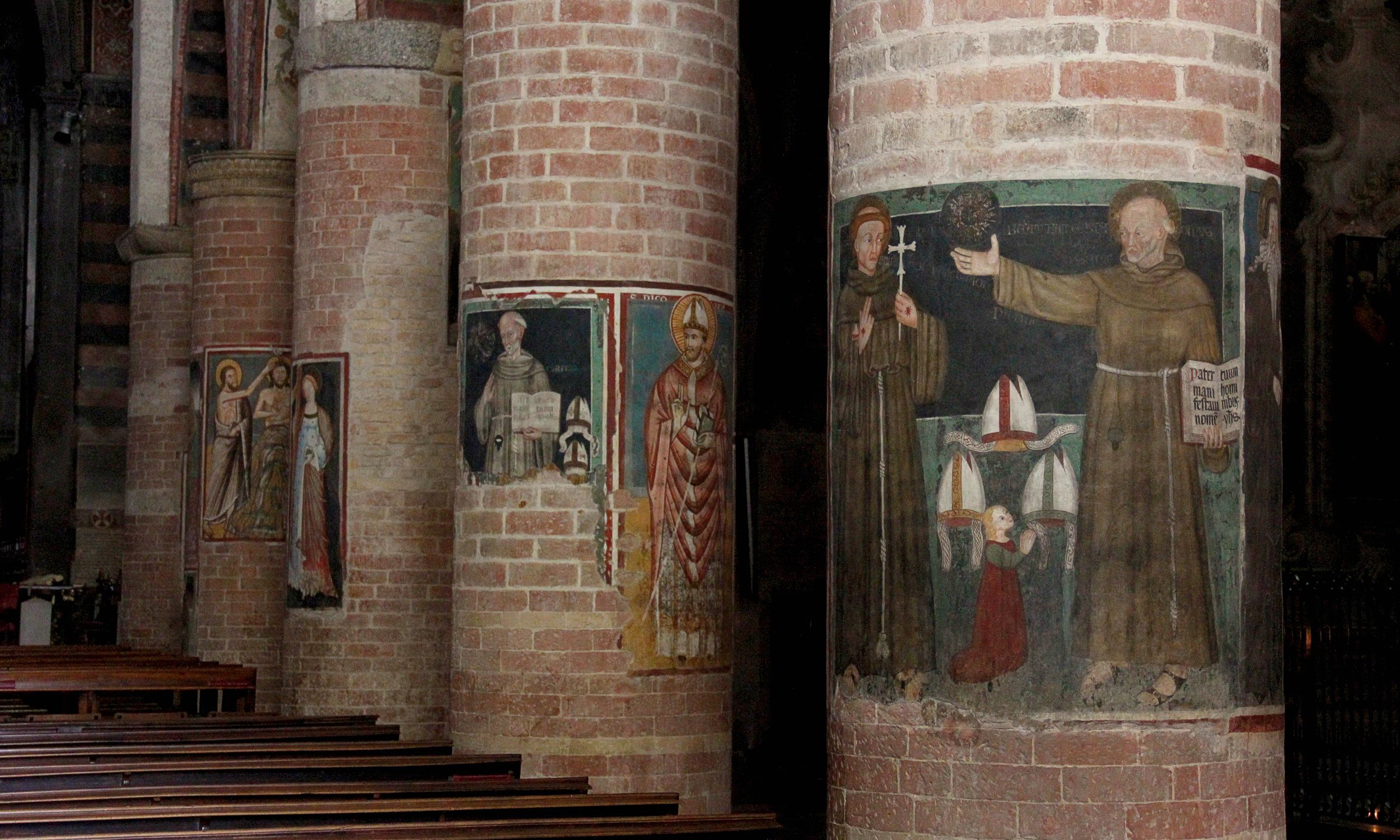
Frescoes in the Church of San Francesco

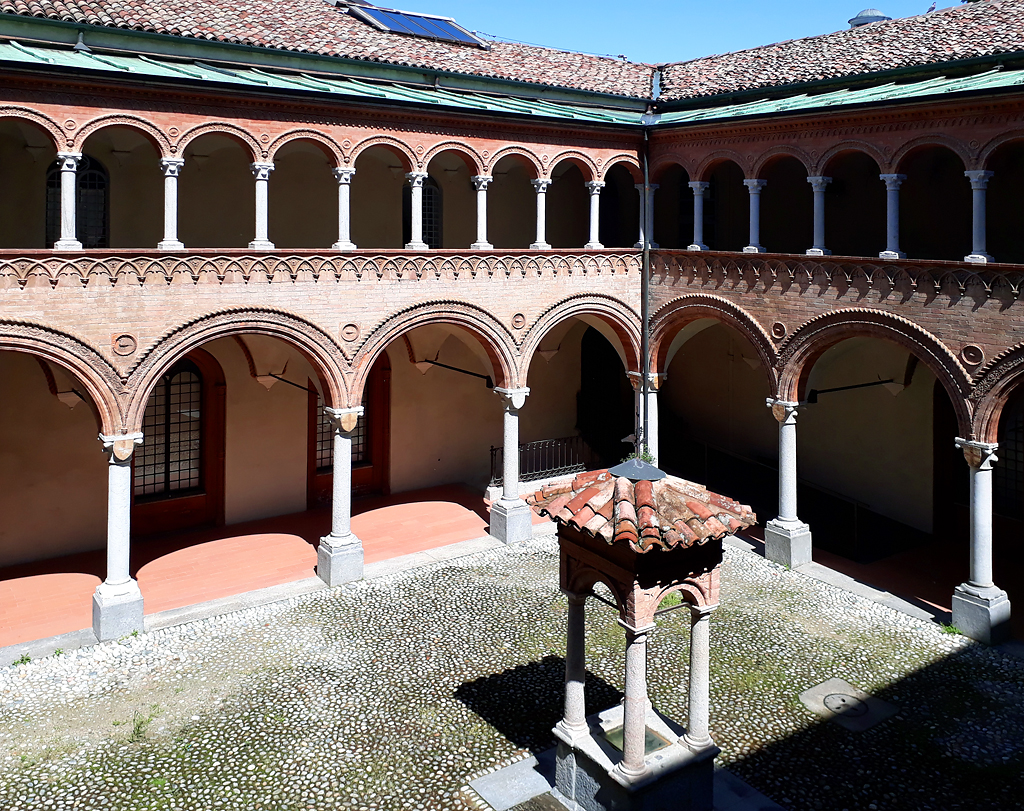
Cloister of Ospedale vecchio

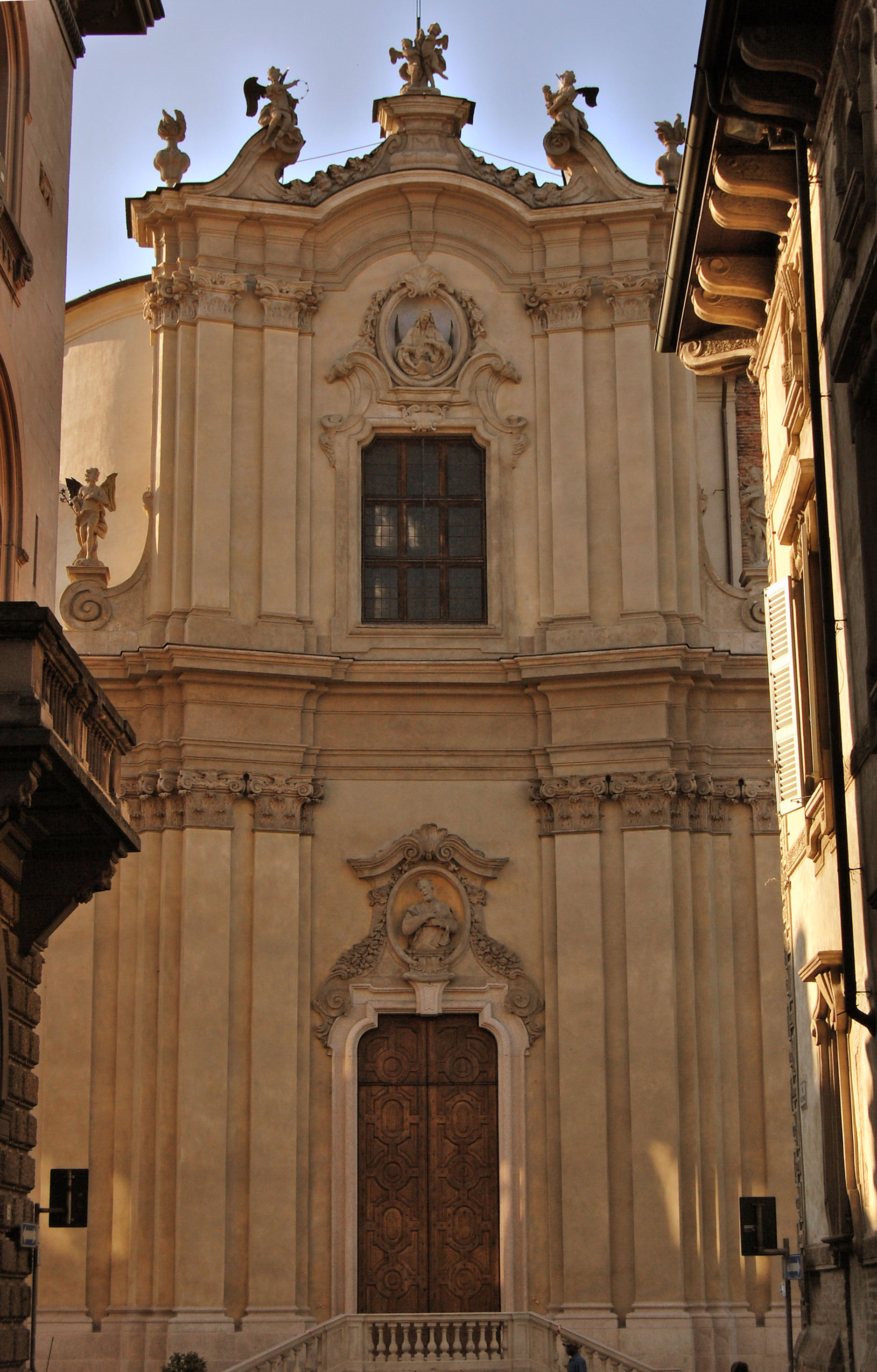
Façade of San Filippo Church

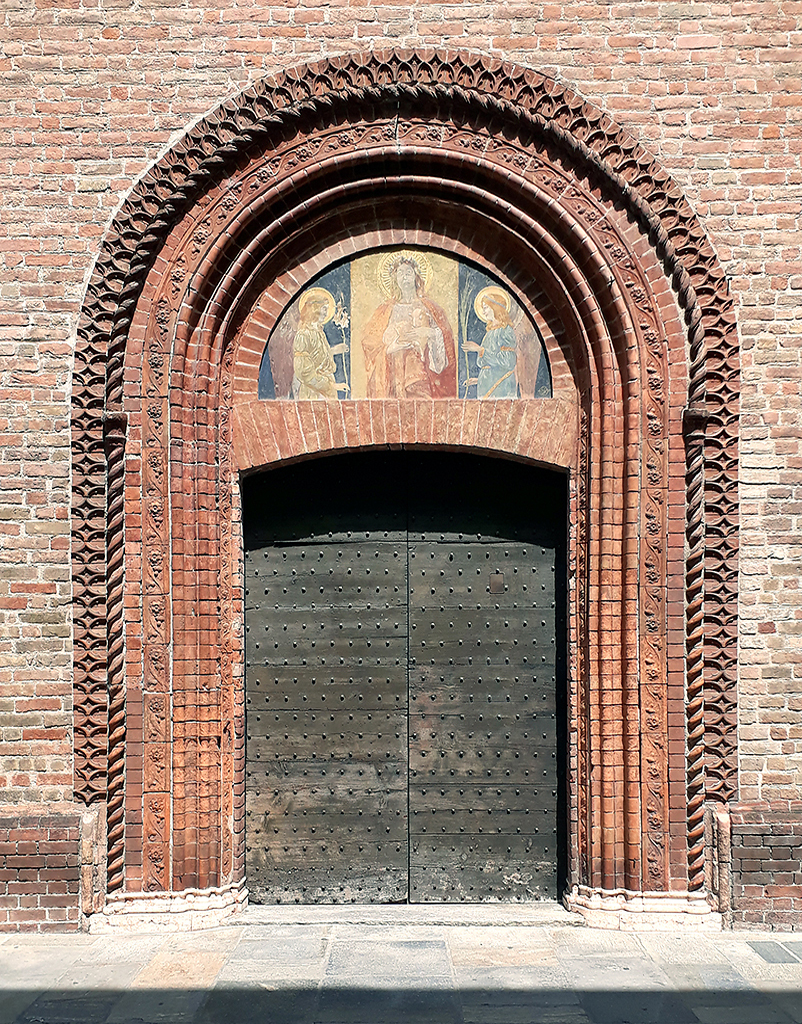
Portal of Sant'Agnese Church

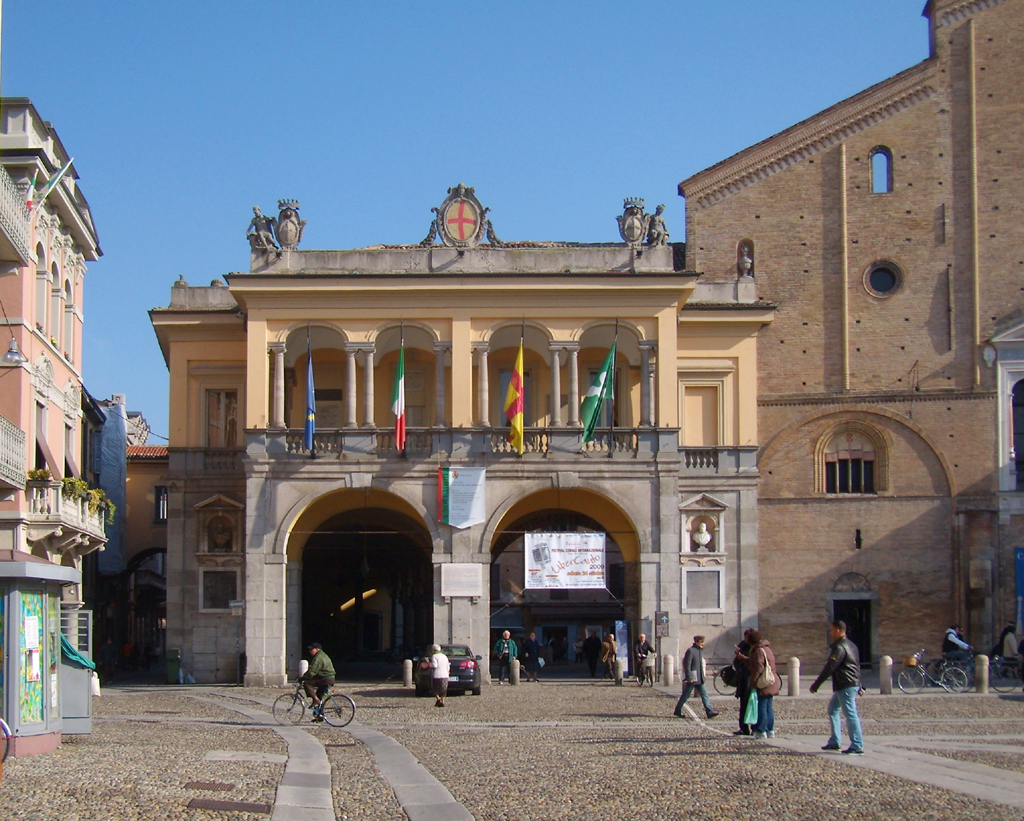
Broletto Palace viewed from Piazza della Vittoria

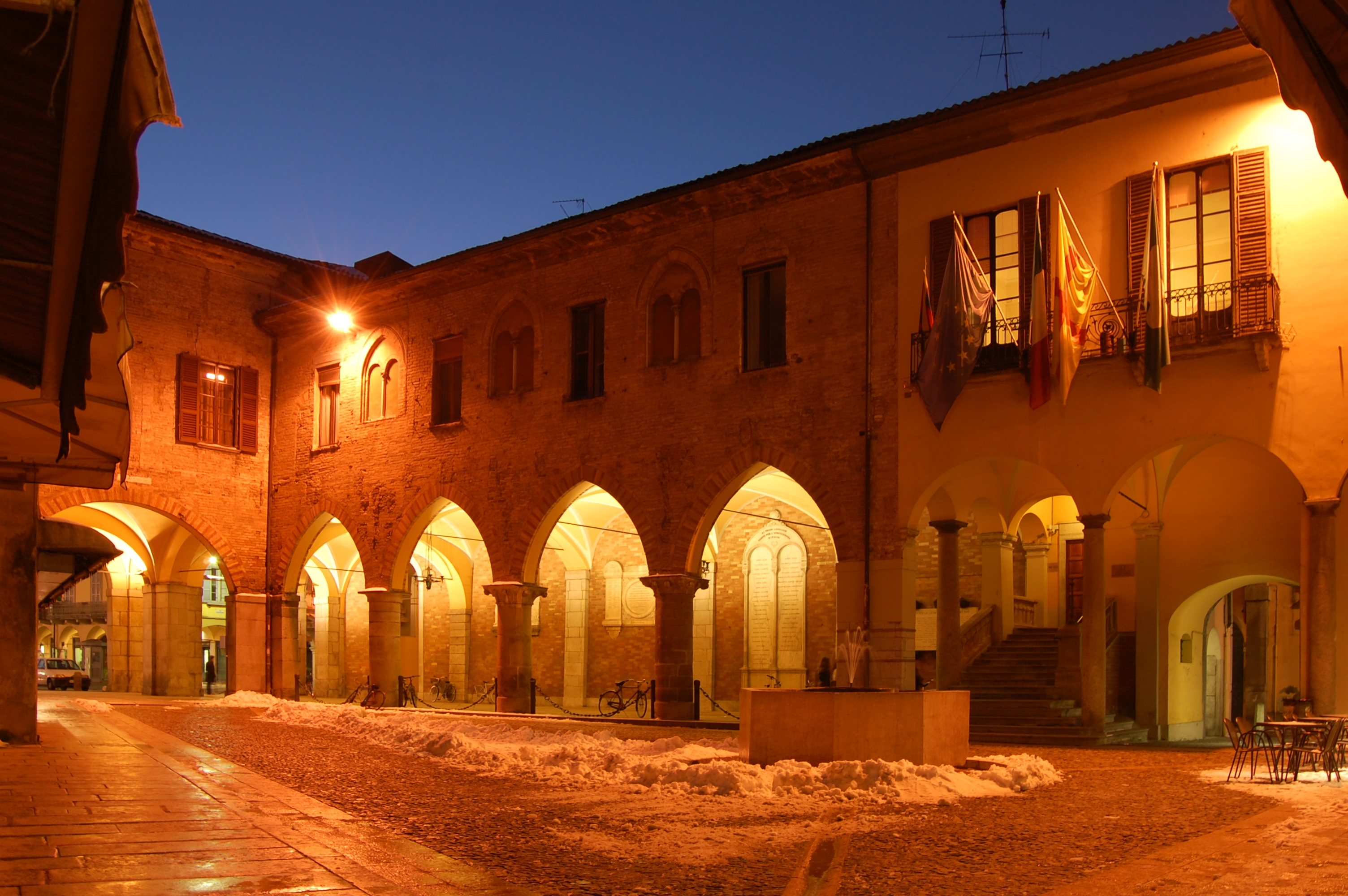
Broletto square in the night

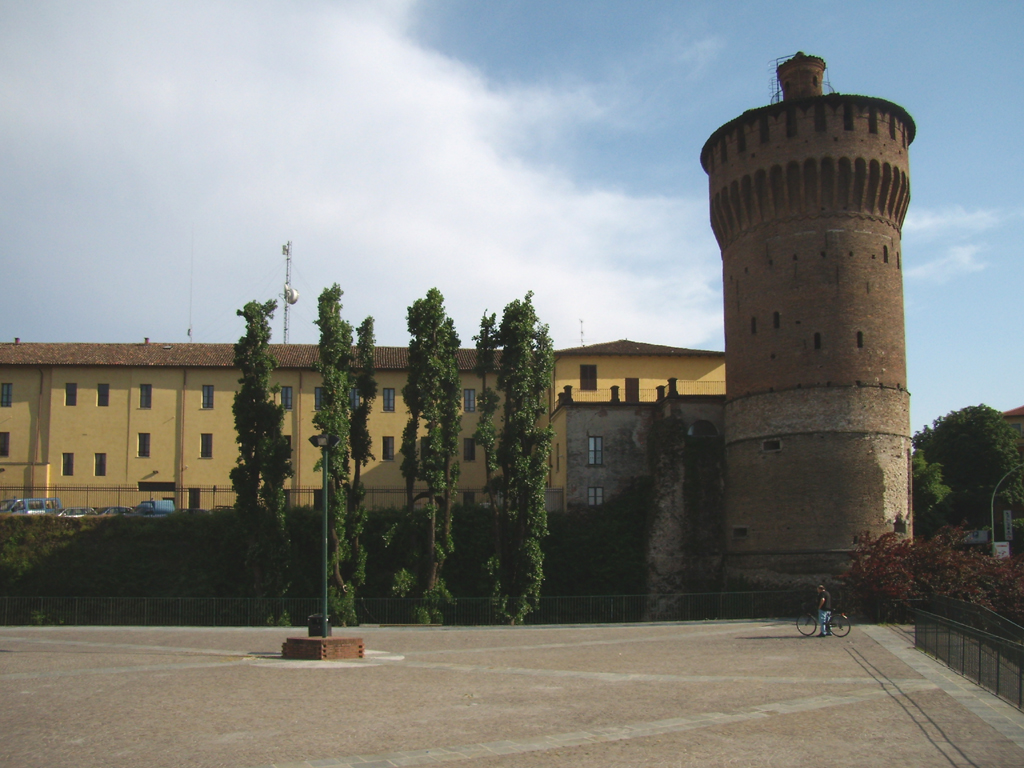
Visconti Castle

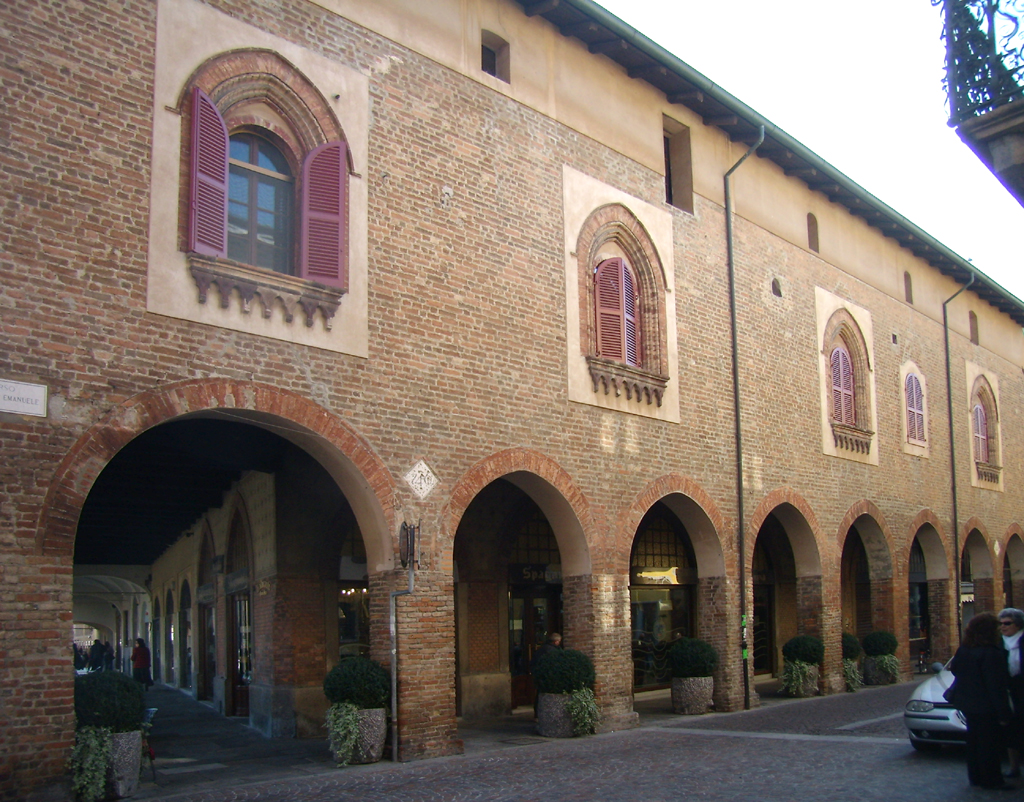
Vistarini Palace

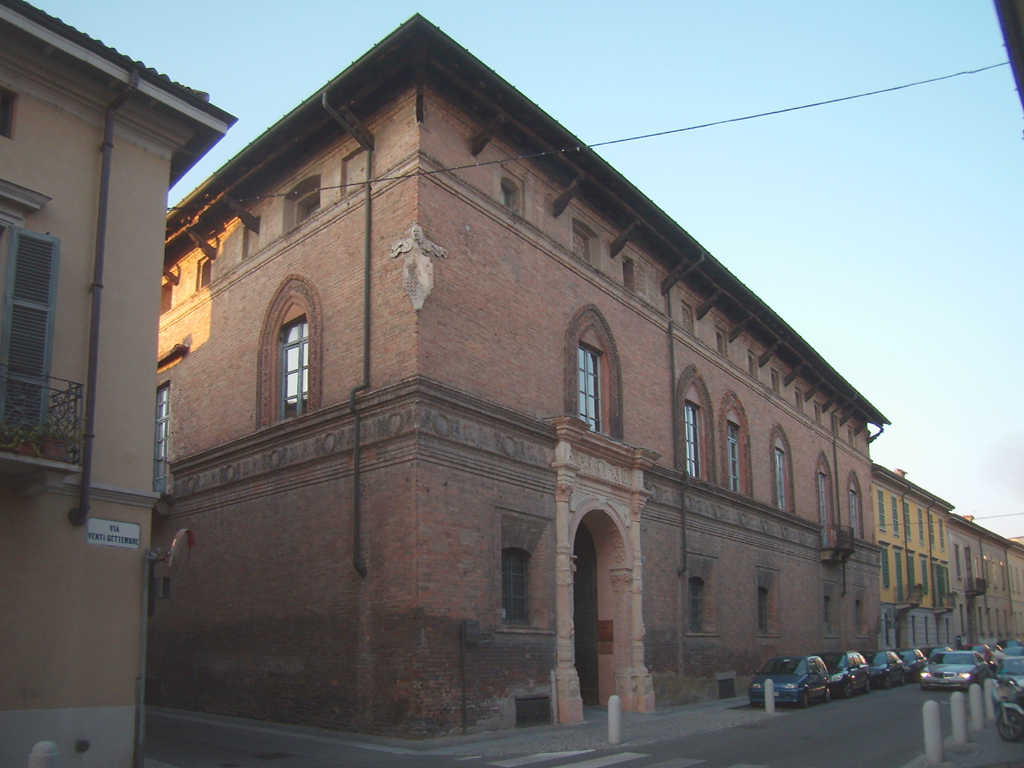
Mozzanica palace

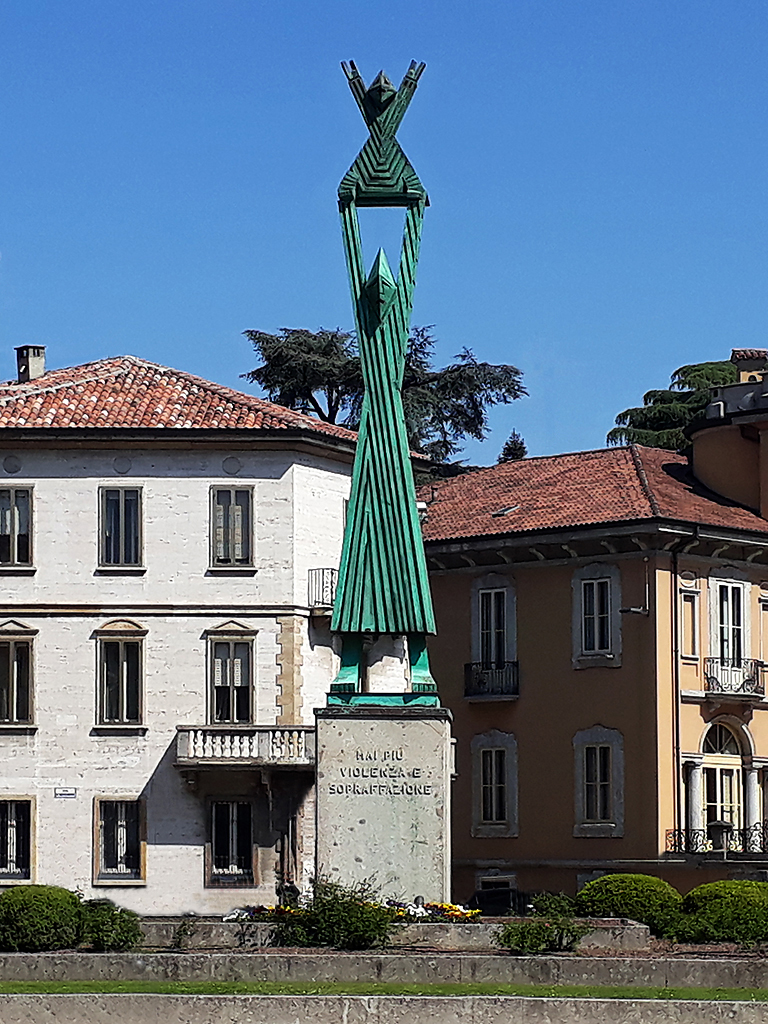
Monument to the Italian resistance movement

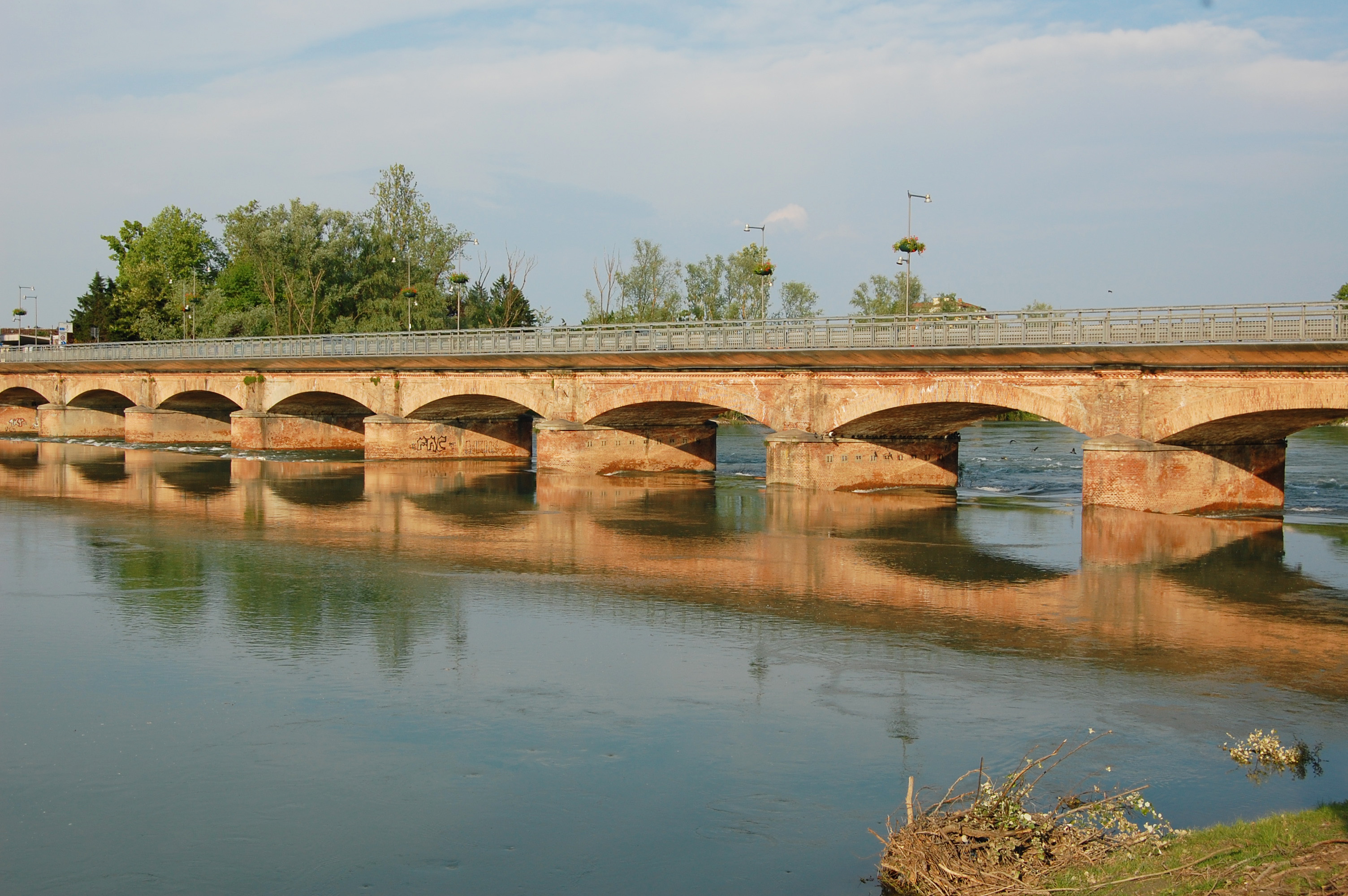
Bridge on the River Adda

== See also ==
- Province of Lodi
- Roman Catholic Diocese of Lodi
- Treaty of Lodi

== Bibliography ==
- Agnelli, Giovanni (1989) [1916]. Lodi ed il suo territorio nella storia, nella geografia e nell'arte [Lodi and Its Territory in History, Geography, and Art]. Lodi: Il Pomerio. ISBN 88-7121-046-8.
- Ambreck, Beatrice; et al. (1996). Atlante della nuova Provincia di Lodi [Atlas of the New Province of Lodi]. Lodi: Il Giorno.
- Bassi, Age (1977). Storia di Lodi [History of Lodi]. Lodi: Edizioni Lodigraf. ISBN 88-7121-018-2.
- Bassi, Age (1979). Lodi fra storia e cronaca dal 1919 al 1945 [Lodi Between History and Chronicle from 1919 to 1945]. Lodi: Il Pomerio. ISBN 88-7121-019-0.
- Bottini, Vittorio (1978). La cucina lodigiana [Cuisine of Lodi]. Lodi: Edizioni Lodigraf.
- Bottini, Vittorio; Caretta, Alessandro; Samarati, Luigi (1979). Lodi – Guida artistica illustrata [Lodi – Illustrated Artistic Guide]. Lodi: Edizioni Lodigraf.
- Colombo, Elisabetta (2005). "Il governo del Municipio. Una politica a dimensione di città" [The municipal government. A policy tailored to the city]. In Giorgio Bigatti (ed.). Il Municipio e la Città – Il Consiglio comunale di Lodi (1859-1970) [The Municipality and the City – The Lodi City Council (1859-1970)]. Cinisello Balsamo: Silvana Editoriale. ISBN 88-8215-999-X.
- Dossi, Eugenia, ed. (2005). Enciclopedia Generale Garzanti [Garzanti General Encyclopedia]. Milano: Garzanti.
- Fontana, Sara (2007). "Pittura, scultura e promozione artistica a Lodi e sul territorio nella prima metà del Novecento" [Painting, Sculpture, and Artistic Promotion in Lodi and Its Territory in the First Half of the Twentieth Century]. In Sergio Rebora (ed.). Ottocento Novecento. Arte a Lodi tra due secoli [Nineteenth and Twentieth Centuries: Art in Lodi Between Two Centuries]. Milano: Skira. ISBN 978-88-6130-475-8.
- Galuzzi, Sergio, ed. (2000). Lodi in un giorno [Lodi in One Day]. Lodi: Giona.
- Majocchi, Pierluigi (2008). "Francesco Sforza e la pace di Lodi" [Francesco Sforza and the Peace of Lodi]. Archivio Storico Lodigiano – Organo della Società Storica Lodigiana [Lodi Historical Archive – Organ of the Lodi Historical Society]. Lodi: Società Storica Lodigiana.
- Martani, Bassano (1990) [1880]. La buona indole dei lodigiani [The Good Nature of the People of Lodi]. Lodi: Il Pomerio. ISBN 88-7121-057-3.
- Meriggi, Marco (1987). "Il Regno Lombardo-Veneto" [Kingdom of Lombardy–Venetia]. Storia d'Italia [History of Italy]. Vol. 18. Torino: UTET. ISBN 88-02-04043-5.
- Meriggi, Maurizio (2005). "Lo sviluppo urbanistico" [Urban Development]. In Giorgio Bigatti (ed.). Il Municipio e la Città – Il Consiglio comunale di Lodi (1859-1970) [The Municipality and the City – The Lodi City Council (1859-1970)]. Cinisello Balsamo: Silvana Editoriale. ISBN 88-8215-999-X.
- Negri, Aldo; Blanchetti, Stefano (2021). Campioni oltre l'impossibile [Champions Beyond the Impossible]. Lodi: Editoriale Laudense.
- Ongaro, Ercole (2008). Al servizio dell'uomo e della terra: Giovanni Haussmann [In Service of Man and the Land: Giovanni Haussmann]. Milano: Jaca Book. ISBN 978-88-16-40826-5.
- Ongaro, Ercole; Riccadonna, Gianluca (2006). Percorsi di Resistenza nel Lodigiano [Paths of Resistance in the Lodi Area]. Lodi: Istituto lodigiano per la storia della Resistenza e dell'età contemporanea.
- Papagni, Aldo; Maietti, Andrea (2008). Il secolo del Guerriero – Lodi e l'A.C. Fanfulla: cento anni di passioni sportive (1908-2008) [The Century of the Warrior – Lodi and A.C. Fanfulla: One Hundred Years of Sporting Passion (1908-2008)]. Azzano San Paolo: Bolis Edizioni. ISBN 978-88-7827-170-8.
- Pezzini, Bruno (2000). Dizionario del dialetto lodigiano [Dictionary of the Lodi Dialect]. Lodi: Editoriale Laudense. ISBN 88-85237-13-4.
- Ruffilli, Tiziano, ed. (2005). Le piazze [The Squares]. Città d'arte della Pianura Padana.
- Sciolla, Gianni Carlo, ed. (1989). I Piazza da Lodi: una tradizione di pittori nel Cinquecento [The Piazza Family from Lodi: A Tradition of Painters in the Sixteenth Century]. Milano: Electa. ISBN 88-435-3015-1.
- Vignati, Cesare (1997) [1859]. Storia di Lodi e il suo territorio [History of Lodi and Its Territory]. Lodi: Il Pomerio. ISBN 88-7072-250-3.
