= Santa Maria Maddalena, Lodi =

Church building in Lodi, Italy

Coordinates: 45.318231°N 9.504203°E

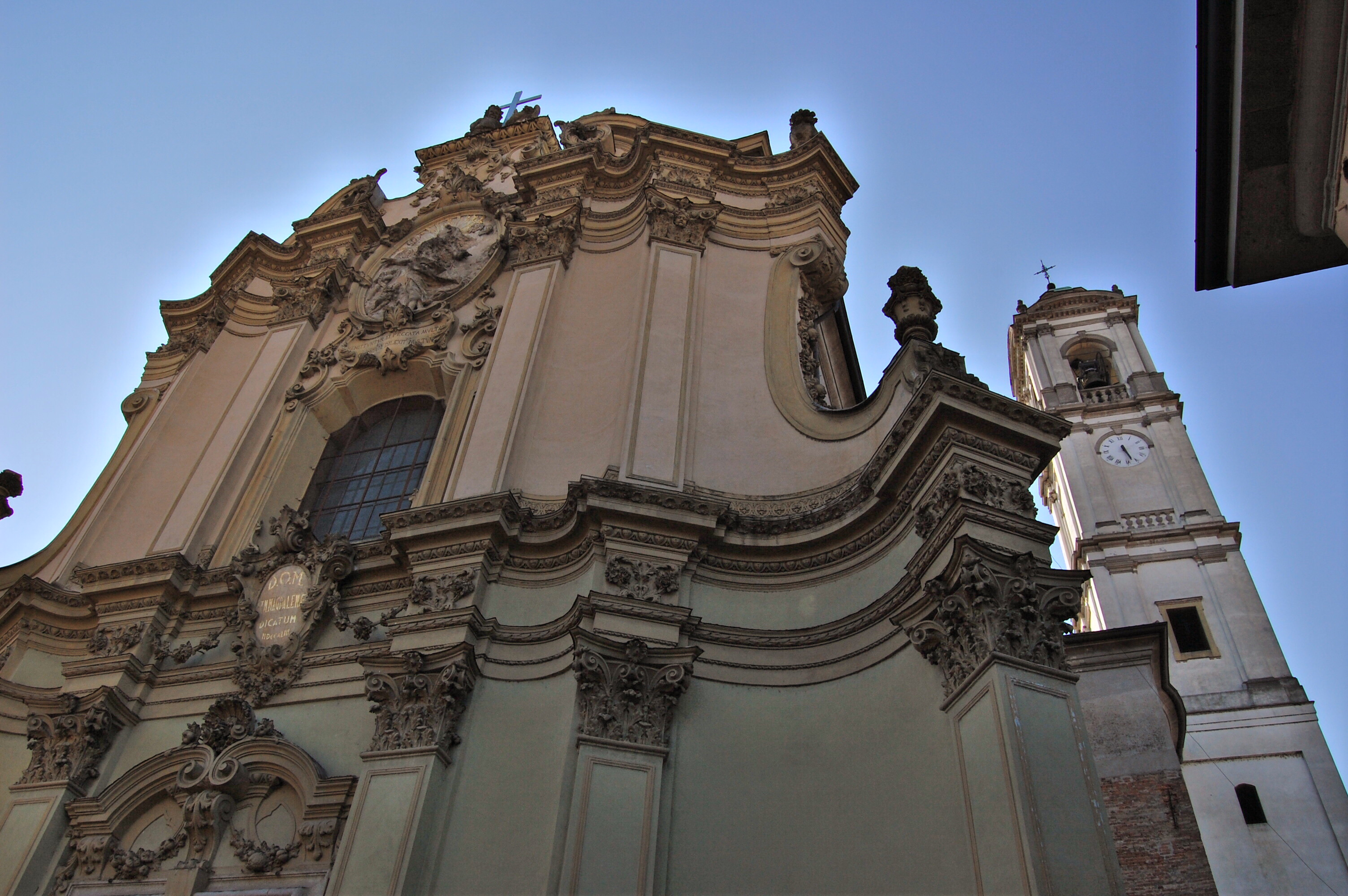
Facade of church

Santa Maria Maddalena, also called the Chiesa della Maddalena, is a late Baroque-style Roman Catholic church located on via Maddalena in central Lodi, Lombardy, Italy.

== History ==
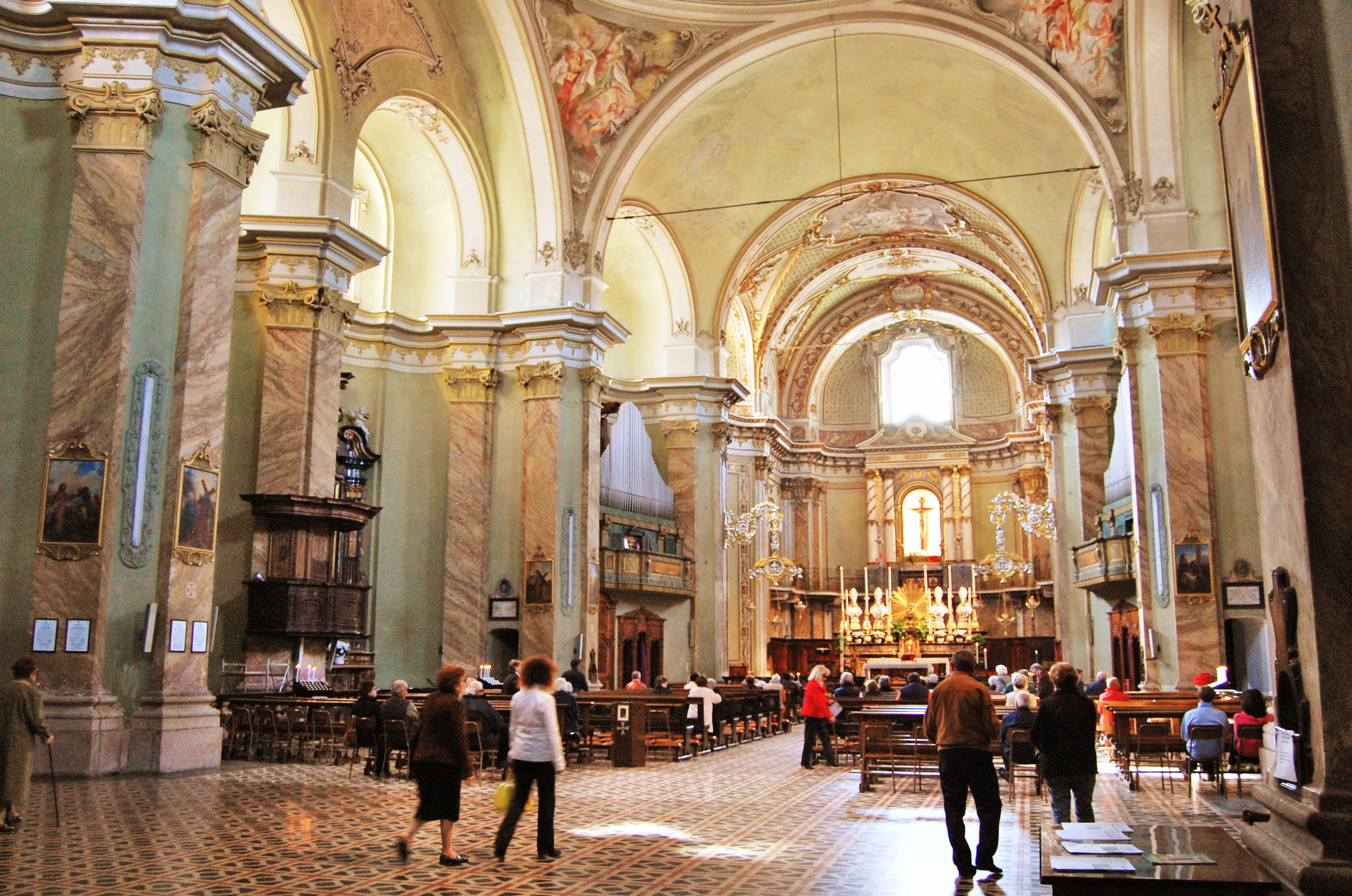
Interior of church

According to tradition, an ancient Roman temple dedicated to Hercules was present at this site. A later, newly built church, dedicated to Mary Magdalen, is recalled as having burned in a town fire in 1162. Documents across the centuries recall its slow reconstruction, however, during the 18th century, the entire structure was rebuilt. A new Rococo church was started in 1719, the choir fully roofed in 1732, the bell-tower added in 1751. The altar of the Immaculate Conception was added in 1756. In 1757, the Altar of the Passion was completed. The church was designed by the brothers Pietro Giacomo, Michele, and Domenico Sartorio; who also built the contemporary church of San Filippo in Lodi.

The fourteen canvases depicting the Via Crucis were painted by Antonietta Bisi of Milan. The main altar houses a venerated medieval crucifix, attributed to the Blessed Giacomo Oldo Lodigiano. The interiors include frescoes by Carlo Innocenzo Carloni and his studio. An altarpiece of the Crucifixion is by Robert De Longe, called il Fiammingo. Beside the church are remnants of the 12th century church.
