= Parco Tecnologico Padano =

Coordinates: 45°18′15.29″N 9°28′18.76″E

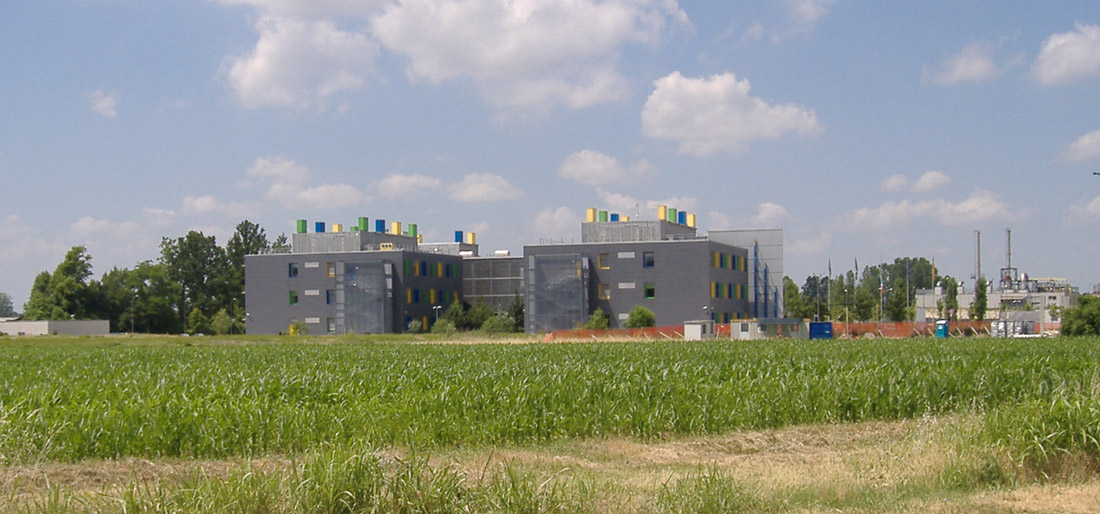
View of Parco Tecnologico Padano

The Parco Tecnologico Padano (meaning Padano Technology Park or Padano Technological Park in English), shortened as PTP, is a science park located in Lodi in the region of Lombardy, Italy. The aim of the park is the promotion of scientific research and technological transition in the fields of agri-food, life sciences and bioeconomics. A number of organizations operate within the PTP, including Faculties of Veterinary Medicine and Agricultural Sciences of the University of Milan and public and private research labs.

PTP is the first scientific park in Italy active in the fields of food cultivation and bioeconomy. The Park also hosts an enterprise Incubator and a Business Park which make Lodi one of the main European Agro-Biotech Clusters.
