= Muzza Canal =

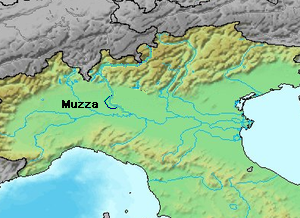

Location
- Country: Italy

Physical characteristics
- Source
  - location: River Adda at Cassano d'Adda, (Province of Milan)
  - elevation: 120 m (390 ft)
- Mouth
  - location: River Adda at Castiglione d'Adda (Province of Lodi)
- Length: 60.6 km (37.7 mi)
- Discharge
  - average: 90 and 75 and 40 m^{3}/s (3,200 and 2,600 and 1,400 cu ft/s) (at Truccazzano; Mulazzano; Muzza P.)

The Muzza Canal in Lombardy, Italy is one of the oldest European irrigation canals, excavated between 1220 and 1230 on Imperial decree by Lodi townspeople. It begins in Cassano d'Adda, and delivers Adda River water to a wide agricultural area.
