= Rosolino Grignani =

Italian footballer (1908–1945)

Personal information
- Date of birth: 11 October 1908
- Place of birth: Bascapè, Italy
- Date of death: 27 April 1945 (aged 36)
- Place of death: Lodi, Italy
- Position: Forward

Senior career*
Years	Team	Apps	(Gls)
1929–1937	Fanfulla	>5	(25)
- * Club domestic league appearances and goals

Rosolino Grignani (11 October 1908 – 27 April 1945) was an Italian professional footballer who played as a forward in Serie C for Fanfulla.

== Personal life ==
Grignani worked as a Bakelite moulder. During the Second World War, Grignani served as a resistance member, working with four siblings to create false documents needed for Allied prisoners and draft evaders to escape to Switzerland. On 27 April 1945, Grignani was traveling to Lodi along with a friend when they were confronted by a force of German soldiers. Despite displaying a flag of surrender, both men were hit by gunfire. Several days later, Grignani was found dead of his injuries.
