= Sant'Agnese, Lodi =

Church in Lodi, Italy

Coordinates: 45°18′45.88″N 9°30′10.85″E

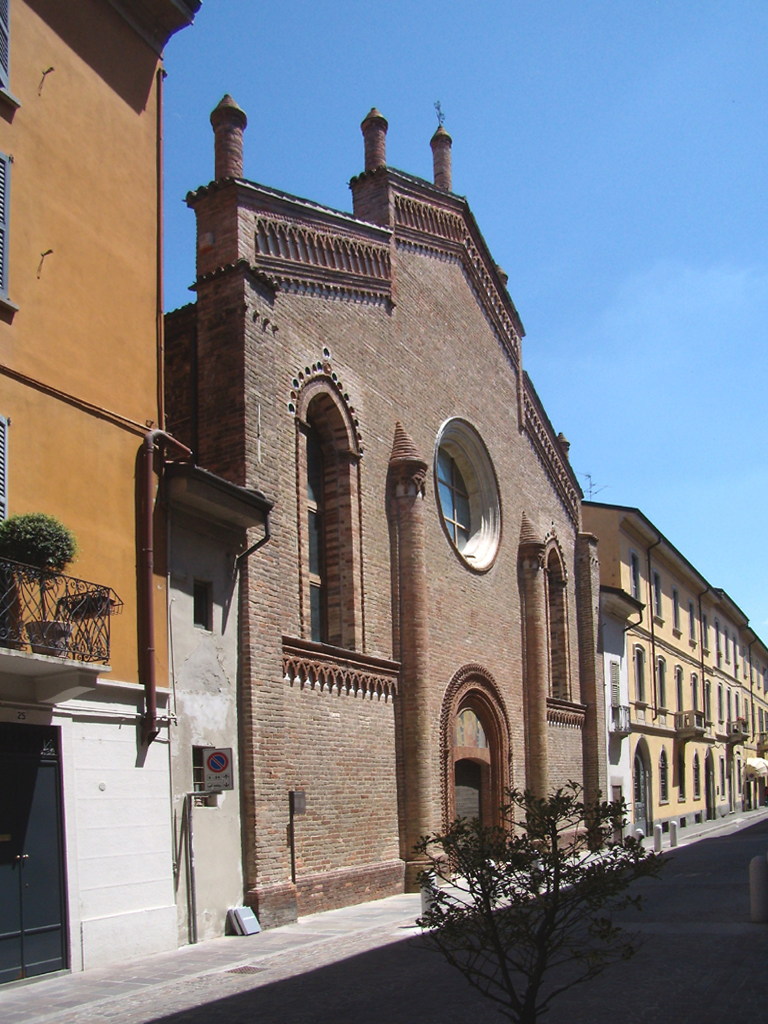

Religion
- Affiliation: Catholic, Augustinian
- Region: Lombardy
- Year consecrated: 1351

Location
- Country: Italy
- Interactive map of Sant'Agnese, Lodi

Architecture
- Style: Gothic

The Church of Sant'Agnese is a Gothic-style, Augustinian church in Lodi, Lombardy, a region of Italy. The church was expanded in 1393 by Bonifacio Bottigella when he became Bishop of Lodi. Bottigella oversaw the diocese until 1404. The church has been celebrated as representing a great moment in Lombard Gothic Architecture. The polygonal apse and two-tiered bell-tower are similar to that of the Lodi Cathedral.

== Facade ==
The Facade resembles that of the Lodi Cathedral. Its defining characters are its accentuated vertical extension, arched windows, a staggered cornice, unique pointed pinnacles, and Acroterion decoration.

== Interior ==
The interior has three naves of equal height supported by ornate groin-vaults. This is supported by rows of cylindrical pillars. The original structure is almost entirely intact, although the original late-Gothic paintings which adorned the walls have not survived.

=== The Galliani Polyptych ===
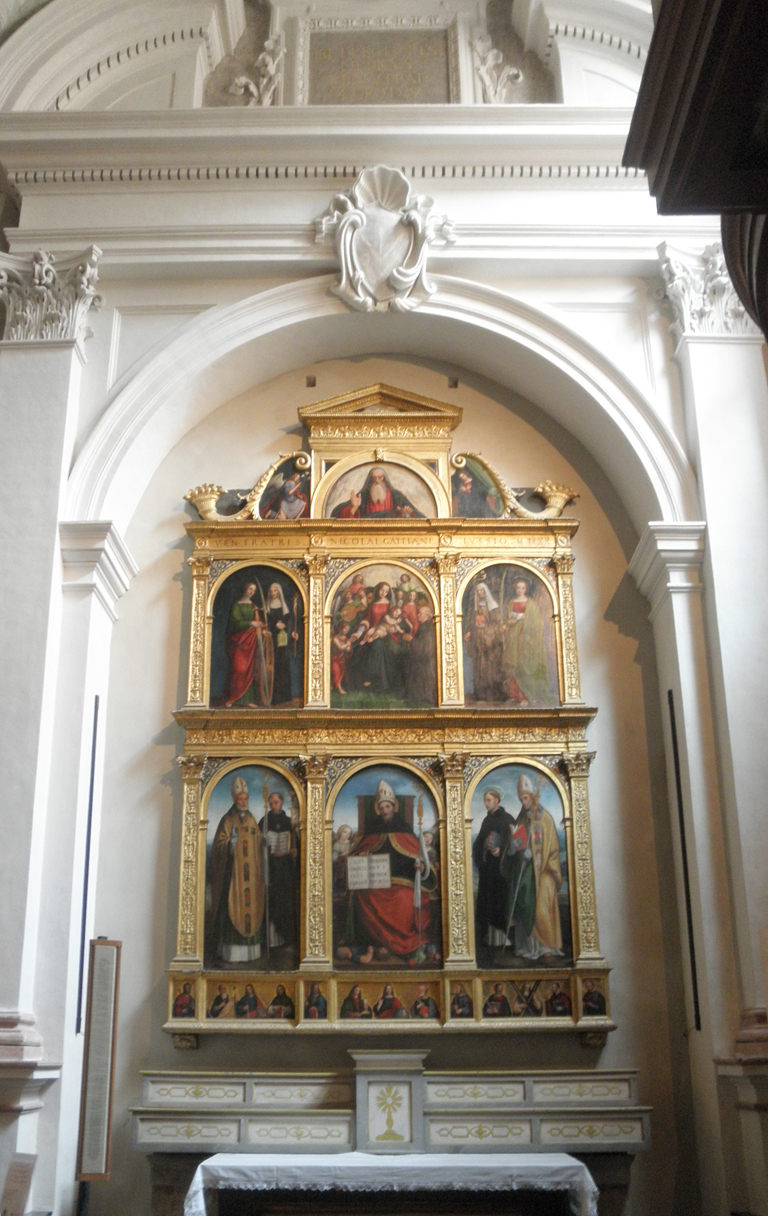
The Galliani Polyptych, Oil on panel, 420×280 cm

The church houses a large polyptych by Albertino Piazza. The most important piece of art in the church, it was painted in 1520 which originally served as the Altarpiece. It was later relocated to a chapel on the first chapel of the right side of the aisles. The Tympanum shows a representation of the white dove between rays of light, a symbol of the Holy Spirit. The lunette shows a representation of God the Father imparting a blessing, flanked by scenes of annunciation.
