= Santa Maria del Sole, Lodi =

Church in Lodi, Italy

Santa Maria del Sole is a late Baroque-style Roman Catholic church located on via Santa Maria del Solea in central Lodi, region of Lombardy, Italy.

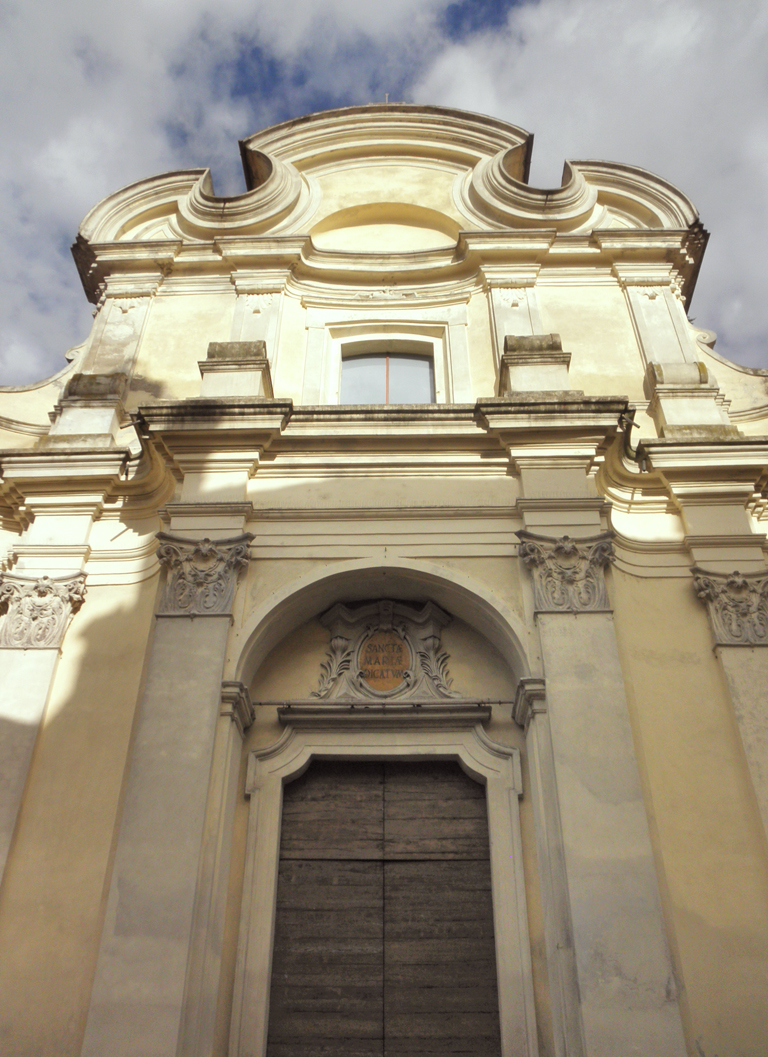
Facade

== History ==
A chapel was erected in the mid-16th century to shelter an image of the Madonna painted on a wall. A church was erected in 1564, and two decades later the image of the madonna was transferred to this church. The icon had an image of the sun next to the Madonna. In 1710–1715, the church was rebuilt under the guidance of the architect Rocco Pellegrino. Tommaso Bonio architect of Facade

Attached to the church was the Confraternity of the Disciplini della Carita, a charity dedicated helping those incarcerated and condemned to die. In 1644 they were granted by Philip IV of Spain, the right to free one man condemned to die.

The interior of the church has statues depicting Hope and Faith by the sculptor Somaini. The choir has an altarpiece depicting Coronation of the Virgin and the Mysteries of the Rosary by Giovanni Battista Trotti.
