= Milan–Lodi War =

Date	August 1107–May 1111
Location	southern Lombardy, present-day Italy
Result	Milanese victory: Destruction of Lodi; Annexation of Lodi to Milan

Belligerents
Comune of Milan; Comune of Crema; Comune of Tortona	Comune of Lodi; Comune of Pavia; Comune of Cremona

Casualties and losses
Unknown	Heavy

The Milan–Lodi War was a conflict fought in the early 12th century between the Lombard comuni of Milan and Lodi, resulting in the defeat and destruction of the latter.

== Background ==
The death in 1052 of Boniface of Canossa without male heirs resulted in Isola Fulcheria, one of his fiefdoms, whose most important center was the city of Crema, passing under the direct control of the Holy Roman Emperor. In 1055 the emperor Henry III the Black donated the fiefdom to Upaldo, bishop of Cremona, but Beatrice of Lorraine, widow of Bonifacio, decided that after her death the fiefs of her husband would be inherited by her daughter, Matilde of Canossa. On 1 January 1098 Matilda decided to cede the countryside of Isola Fulcheria to the bishopric and to the city of Cremona on the condition that in exchange for it they would swear loyalty to her, recognizing her as their lady. The Cremonese accepted, but Crema refused to submit to Cremona, prompting the latter to send an army against Crema in May of the same year, without however being able to capture due to the city being well fortified and provided with a strong castle. In 1102 Crema went on the counteroffensive, re-establishing the status quo ante bellum. Due to the stalemate, both cities then started diplomatic negotiations with their neighbors in order to secure allies. Cremona made alliances with Lodi and Pavia, and Crema did the same with Milan and Tortona.

== War ==
In August 1107 the militias of Cremona, Lodi and Pavia attacked Tortona and managed to set fire to one of its suburbs. This action triggered the intervention of its ally Milan, which promised to raze Lodi, its rival in the control of trade along the Lambro. The Milanese could count on the support of Arderico, bishop of Lodi, his brother Gariardo and a part of the nobility of Lodi; however the people and the clergy of Lodi, harboring strong suspicions regarding the partiality of their bishop towards the enemy, exiled him from the city. Arderico was in fact Milanese, hailing from Vignate, a village in the Martesana countryside, and spent a lot of time in Milan, rarely being seen in Lodi, being always partial to Grosolanus, archbishop of Milan, known for having been accused of simony by the priest Liprando.

In 1108 Guido Pescari, archbishop of Pavia, moved against the Milanese with the local militia and most of the citizens. According to Leo of Ostia, the two armies met in Campo Ollii, a place not well identified. The most probable hypothesis is that it must be identified with an expanse of fields near the Olona river south of Milan, since Galvano Fiamma wrote that the site of the battle was "versus civitatem Mediolani", and "Olii" appears among the names for the Olona in some documents of that period. For this reason, the possibility that Campo Olii meant fields near the Oglio river, as claimed by Bernardino Corio, appears less likely. In the battle that followed, the Milanese won a decisive victory in which most of the army and enemy citizens were captured, including the archbishop of Pavia himself. Fiamma recounts that after a few days spent in various prisons in the Milanese countryside, the Pavesi were freed and taken to Milan in the town square, located in front of the Broletto Vecchio. Here, as a mockery, a bundle of straw was tied to the back of each of them and set fire to them and in this manner they were driven out of the city.

On 18 June 1110 the Milanese defeated the Cremonese in the battle of Bressanoro (Brixianorum), just north of Castelleone. Although not mentioned in the chronicles of Landulf Junior, who was in France at that time, the victory over the Cremonese was most likely followed by a second victory over Pavia. In May 1111 the Milanese, taking advantage of the absence of the Emperor Henry V of Franconia, who was on his way from Verona to Germany after a turbulent coronation in Rome, sent the army against Lodi and, after a siege that lasted less than a month, took the city on 24 May 24, then set it on fire and completely razed it to the ground, sparing only the churches. This thorough destruction took a month to complete.

== Consequences ==
After its destruction, the Milanese imposed a harsh peace on the people of Lodi, forbidding the reconstruction of Lodi, which never returned to being a city of primary importance. They also forbade holding the market there, selling or buying possessions and obtaining licenses without the authorization of Milanese magistrates. On pain of exile, they prevented anyone from helping them and prescribed the confiscation of assets from those city magistrates who had not enforced these provisions. In June 1112 Giordano da Clivio, the new archbishop of Milan, entered into a peace and a defensive and offensive alliance with Pavia. Cremona managed to take possession of Crema only on 26 August 1116, followed by a peace with the Milanese.

On 3 August 1158, Emperor Frederick I Barbarossa refounded the city of Lodi four miles east of the old settlement, on the banks of the Adda, and guaranteed it many privileges thanks to which it quickly returned to flourish. A village called Lodi Vecchio ("Old Lodi") was built on the ruins of the destroyed city.
