= Landulf Junior =

Italian historian

Landulf of Saint Paul (floruit 1077–1137), called Landulf Junior to distinguish him from Landulf Senior, was a Milanese historian whose life is known entirely from his main work, the Historia Mediolanensis. He presents a unique and important point of view from the conflict-ridden years of 1097–1137 in Milan. He thrice sojourned in France while his ecclesiastical faction—the Pataria—was out of favour in Milan, and there learned under some of the leading philosophers of western Europe. After 1113, Landulf's primary ambition was to regain the priesthood in the church of San Paolo which he had lost, and to this end he communicated with popes and emperors. He played a role—large in his own account—in the election of Conrad of Hohenstaufen as King of Italy in 1128.

== Life ==
=== Travels in France ===
Landulf's birth year can be approximated from his statement that he was "sixty years old" (sexagenariae aetatis) in 1136. He was a nephew and student of Liprando, a Milanese priest and one of the leaders of the Pataria in the last quarter of the eleventh century. Towards the end of the century, Landulf became an acolyte (acolitus), which was recognised as the highest-ranking of the minor orders in Milan at the time. He held this rank for the rest of his life. In 1095–96, Landulf studied under master Andrea Dalvolto, a priest of the church of San Tecla. Among his fellow students was Nazario Muricola, later his enemy. Later, probably in 1102, he went to Orléans to study under the masters Alfred and James. He may have been avoiding the conflict between the Patarenes, led by Liprando, and the new Papally-approved archbishop, Grosolanus. He was absent from Milan in 1103 when his uncle passed a trial by ordeal.

Landulf returned to Milan but left for France again in 1106. There he stayed for a year and a half with the prominent reforming Milanese churchmen Anselmo della Pusterla and Olrico da Corte, perhaps acting as their secretary. In Tours he sat under the teaching of a master Alfred, perhaps the same one that had taught him half a decade earlier in Orléans, and in Paris he received lessons from the philosopher William of Champeaux. In 1107, Landulf returned again to Milan and escorted his uncle back from exile at Civate.

In 1109, Landulf's brother Antelmo died in the war between Milan and Lodi, and Landulf again went to France with Anselmo della Pusterla and Olrico da Corte. This time he stayed in Laon and learned under Anselm and his brother Ralph. This is the first trip abroad which Landulf characterises as an exile in his Historia, noting that the city magistrate suggested their long absence in order to keep the peace between factions.

=== Marginalisation in Milan ===
Landulf returned to Milan in 1110. He looked favourably upon the entry of the Emperor Henry V into Italy in 1111. That year he fell out with Olrico da Corte upon the latter's abandonment of the Patarene position when he was made an archpresbyter. In 1112–13 Landulf served in his uncle's former church of San Paolo in Compito, since lost, but remembered in the street named Via San Paolo. With his uncle, he founded a church dedicated to the Trinity at an unidentified place called "Pons Guinizeli". With Liprando and Andrea, primicerius and head of the decumani, Landulf also opposed the election of Jordan as archbishop in early 1112. When Jordan offered to make Landulf a subdeacon and cancel one of his debts in return for recognition of his legitimacy from the Pataria, Landulf refused.

With the death of Liprando in January 1113 and of Andrea shortly after, Landulf found himself marginalised. He was expelled from San Paolo and from the ranks of the decumani by Andrea's successor, Nazario Muricola. Thus forced to seek an income outside of the church, he became a teacher and scribe, even working for the municipal government as a "holder of public offices and notary of consular letters" (publicorum officiorum particeps et consulum epistolarum dictator). This is the earliest reference to consuls in medieval Milan.

For the rest of his life, Landulf tried to recover his office in San Paolo. According to him, Jordan made vague promises to get his support at the Lateran council of 1116, but reneged at an assembly (arengo) in 1117. Landulf obtained a letter of recommendation from Pope Gelasius II, which Jordan ignored, in 1118. He went to Rome to plead his case to Pope Callistus II in 1120, but the pope did not intervene. Only with the death of Jordan in October and his replacement by Olrico, Landulf's former companion, did the latter achieve some redress—he returned to the decumani, but was not reinstated in San Paolo. He attempted again to plead with Pope Callistus at the Lateran council of 1123–24, but could not get an audience. In 1125 he joined a Milanese embassy to Germany, hoping to plead his case to Emperor Henry, but the mission was cut short by the latter's death and never got further than Trent.

=== Return to power ===
In 1126, Olrico was succeeded as archbishop by Anselmo della Pusterla. Landulf's former travelling companion appointed him head of the archepiscopal chapel, in which capacity he served as a secretary and counsellor. In 1127 Conrad of Hohenstaufen was elected king in Germany in opposition to the emperor-elect Lothair of Supplinburg. Archbishop Anselm charged Landulf with ascertaining whether the Milanese would support Conrad or Lothair, while he himself left the city. Landulf afterwards claimed an important role in the choice of Conrad, who was crowned by Anselmo as King of Italy in 1128, first at Monza, the former Lombard capital city, then at Milan. In 1130, when Anselmo gave his support to the Antipope Anacletus II, Landulf followed him. In 1135, he was convinced by Bernard of Clairvaux to support Pope Innocent II, but when Anselmo was deposed and fled the city, Landulf was again pushed to the margins by a new archbishop, Robaldo di Alba.

In November 1136, Landulf renewed his claim on the church of San Paolo before Lothair of Supplinburg, now undisputed emperor, who was holding court at Roncaglia. The emperor refused to adjudicate the dispute, leaving it to the local authorities. According to Landulf, the machinations of Arnaldo di Rho, chief of a clan traditionally opposed to the Pataria, succeeding in blocking his ambitions once more. This is the last notice of Landulf's life. He was still alive in the summer of 1137: he records the Battle of Genivolta, a victory for Milan over Cremona early that year, and the flight of Bishop Oberto di Dovara of Cremona, who wound up a prisoner of the Milanese, some months later.

== Historia Mediolanensis ==
The title Historia Mediolanensis, meaning "A Milanese History", is not contemporary. It was used as a source by several later medieval historians: Bonvesin da La Riva, Goffredo da Bussero, Benzo d'Alessandria and perhaps Galvano Fiamma. Nevertheless, it survives in only one manuscript tradition, at the font of which stands the fifteenth-century manuscript H.89.inf. in the Biblioteca Ambrosiana in Milan. Also at the Ambrosiana are N.296 sup., R.119 sup. and Trotti, 168; at the Biblioteca Trivulziana, also in Milan, is manuscript 348. All these are copies of H.89.inf., a low-quality manuscript littered with errors and gaps. The codex contains, besides the Historia of Landulf Junior, several other histories of Milan: the Historia of Landulf Senior, the Liber gestorum recentium of Arnulf of Milan and a Passio on the death of Arialdo in 1066, once thought to have been by Landulf Junior. In the manuscript, the Historia is titled "The Book of the Histories of the Milanese City by Landulf of St Paul" (Liber hystoriarum Mediolanensis urbis Landulfi de S. Paulo). Medieval writers referred to it as the Copia Landulfi ("Landulf's Store"), probably based on the last line of the manuscript, in hac mea copia. The term was sometimes applied to Arnulf's Liber gestorum recentium and the term Copia Arnulfi was sometimes applied to Landulf's Historia, suggesting perhaps that the four works of Milanese history were treated as a single collection.

Landulf's Historia begins with the disputed election of Anselmo da Bovisio to the see of Milan in 1097. The narrative, which coincides with Landulf's adult life, is compact and circular. It begins with the unjust intervention of a Papal officer, Hermann, in the affairs of the church of Milan and ends with the restoration of good relations between Milan and the Papacy by Bernard of Clairvaux. Landulf places the blame for Milan's problems on Hermann, and notes with satisfaction that both Archbishops Anselmo III and Arnulf III refused to consecrate him after his election as bishop of Brescia. He also approves of King Conrad II's refusal to have anything to do with Anselmo da Bovisio or Hermann's consecration.

Although Landulf is a partisan narrator and his account judgemental as well as personal, it is historically valuable for its eyewitness testimony and its uncritical attitude. Landulf writes "without thorough understanding and remain[s] disturbed by the progressive breaking apart of the traditional order" that birthed the Milanese comune. The quality of Landulf's writing is unexpectedly poor for one who received an education from the leading philosophers of France.

The Historia received its editio princeps from G. A. Sassi, on behalf of Ludovico Muratori, in 1724. The standard critical edition is that of Ludwig Bethmann and Philipp Jaffé for the Monumenta Germaniae Historica in 1868.

== Editions ==
- Sassi, G. A.; Muratori, L. A., ed. Rerum italicarum scriptores, V (Milan, 1724), cols. 429–520
- Bethmann, L.; Jaffé, P. Monumenta Germaniae Historica, Scriptores, XX (Hanover, 1868), pp. 17–49.
- Castiglioni, C. Rerum italicarum scriptores, 2nd ed., V, 3 (Bologna, 1934).

== Sources ==
- Capitani, Ovidio. (1989). "Da Landolfo seniore a Landolfo iuniore: momenti di un processo in crisi". Milano e il suo territorio in età comunale (secc. XI–XII), Atti dell'XI Congresso internazionale di studi sull'Alto Medioevo, Milano, 26–30 ottobre 1987 (Spoleto), 589–622.
- Chiesa, Paolo. (2004). "Landolfo Iuniore (Landolfo di S. Paolo)" Dizionario Biografico degli Italiani 63. Rome: Istituto dell'Enciclopedia Italiana.
- Cowdrey, H. E. J. (1968). "The Succession of the Archbishops of Milan in the Time of Pope Urban II". The English Historical Review 83, 327: 285–94.
- Cowdrey, H. E. J. (1968). "The Papacy, the Patarenes and the Church of Milan". Transactions of the Royal Historical Society, Fifth Series, 18: 25–48.
