= Crusader attack on Blachernae (1101) =

- Part of the Crusades
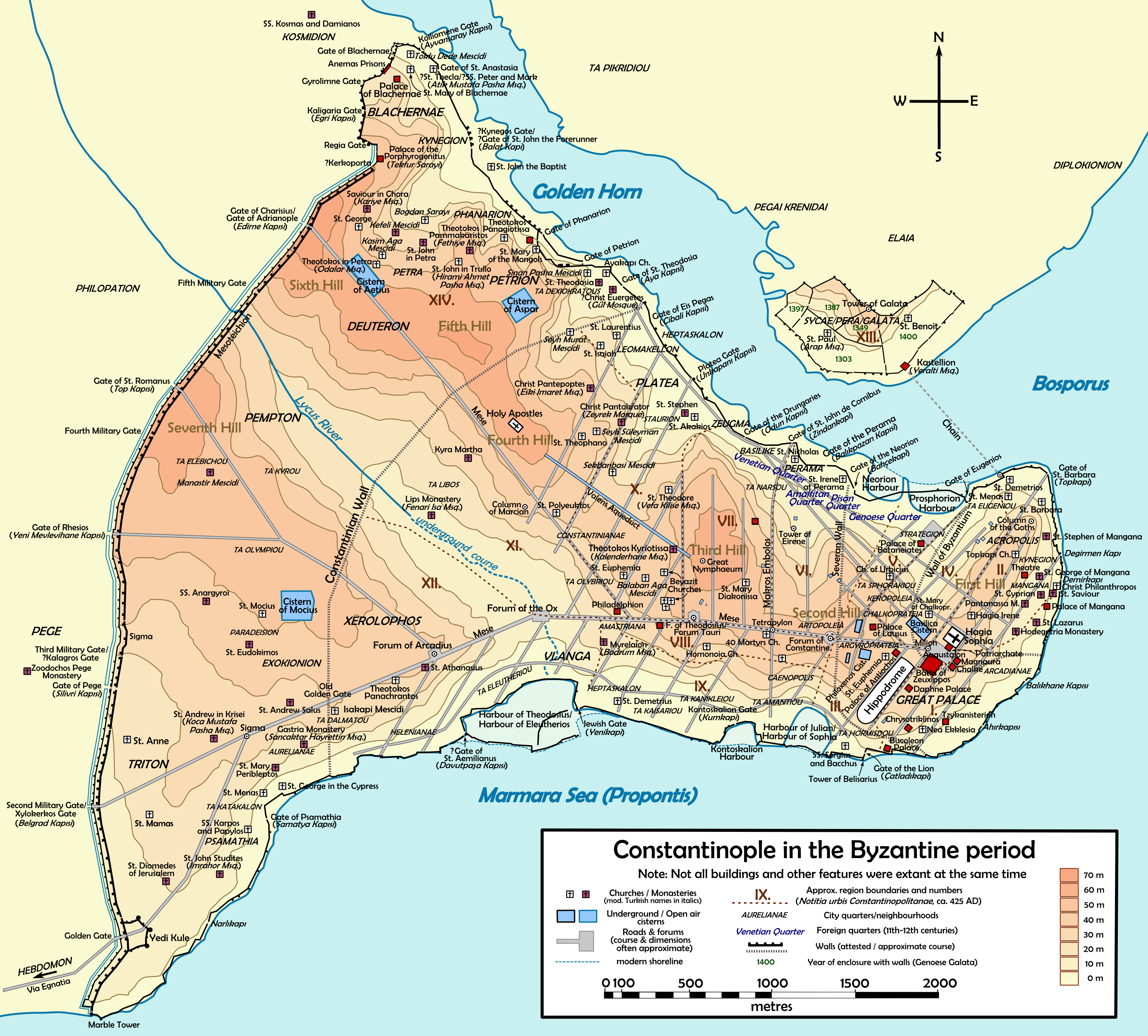
- Map of Constantinople during the Byzantine era. Blachernae is located on the extreme northwestern point of the city.
| Date | Summer of 1101 |
| Location | Constantinople, Byzantine Empire (modern-day Istanbul, Turkey) |
| Result | Blachernae Palace ransacked; Crusaders removed to Anatolia |

Belligerents
| Byzantine Empire | Crusading Lombards |

Commanders and leaders
| Alexios I | Anselm IV, Archbishop of Milan |

Strength
| Unknown | Unknown |

Casualties and losses
| Few, if any soldiers Four lions, possibly seven leopards | Several killed, many others wounded |

The Crusader attack on Blachernae was a skirmish that took place during the Crusade of 1101. As in the First Crusade, the pilgrims and soldiers of 1101 crusade did not leave as a part of one large army, but rather in several groups from various different regions from across Western Europe. In September 1100, a large group of Lombards left from Milan. These were mostly untrained peasants, led by Anselm IV, Archbishop of Milan. When they reached the territory of the Byzantine Empire, they recklessly pillaged the countryside in want of food and provisions until the Byzantine emperor Alexios I, possibly under force of arms, escorted them to a camp outside Constantinople. This did not satisfy them for long, as they forced their way inside the city where they pillaged the Blachernae palace, even killing Alexios' pet lion. In order to limit any further damage, the Lombards were quickly ferried across the Bosporus and made their camp at Nicomedia, to wait for additional Crusading reinforcements.

== The siege ==
The Norman historian Ordericus Vitalis reported that Emperor Alexios I Komnenos at first dismissed the crowd outside the Theodosian Walls as just a rowdy and obstreperous group, clamoring for provisions, either refusing to or unable to move on to Anatolia. But when the group started to break down the outer gates of the Theodosian Walls, he ordered that three fierce lions and seven leopards (“tres ferocissimos leones et septem leopardos”) from his private zoo be driven between the middle and outer walls and posted guards on the inner third wall, against which the Blachernae Palace was built and commanded that the gates be shut. He planned to frighten away the Crusaders with wild beasts and defend the city without human force, thus avoiding direct conflict with the Crusaders. When the Lombards broke through the outer gate, the lions sprang on the first men to enter and injured many others whom they savaged with teeth and claws, tearing at the men who were caught unawares and had no experience of fighting wild animals.

The Crusaders withdrew and once they recovered from their ordeal, returned to throw spears and javelins at the animals, striking down and killing the lions, while driving away the leopards, chasing them as they fled up to the middle wall before leaping over the wall. The Lombards smashed through the gate in the second wall and attempted to take the third by assault. Breaking down the final gates, they ransacked the Blachernae Palace and eventually withdrew back to the camp, either voluntarily or by force of arms. Over the course of the raid on the palace the Lombards also killed the emperor's pet lion, which had been kept as a companion within the palace.

While the ransacking was limited to just the Blachernae palace, the emperor arranged for the Lombards to be quickly ferried across the Bosporus and made their camp at Nicomedia to wait for additional Crusading reinforcements.

== Aftermath ==
Over the next few weeks the majority of the Lombards, along with most of the remaining Crusading army that joined them, was defeated during the Battle of Mersivan. The siege of Constantinople of 1101 was a forerunner of the Fourth Crusade in 1204, which proved to be far more destructive for the Byzantine Empire in the coming centuries.

== See also ==
- Siege of Constantinople (1203)
- Sack of Constantinople (1204)
