= Odo Arpin =

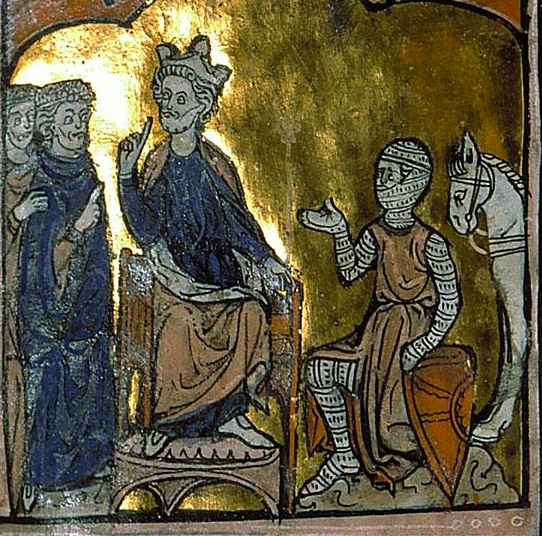

Odo Arpin of Bourges (also Arpinus, Harpinus, or Harpin) (c. 1060 – c. 1130) was a medieval viscount, crusader and monk.

He inherited the lordship of Dun and became viscount of Bourges between 1092 and 1095 after marrying Matilda of Sully, whose sister Alice was the daughter-in-law of Stephen, Count of Blois. He may have shared the viscountcy with Matilda's father Gilo. At some point between 1097 and 1101, Odo sold his possessions in Bourges and Dun to King Philip I of France for sixty thousand shillings. This may or may not have been done to finance his crusade. He participated in the Crusade of 1101, probably with Stephen of Blois, and travelled through Constantinople, where he swore a loyalty oath to Byzantine emperor Alexios I Komnenos. Odo was in Jaffa in 1101, Jerusalem in 1102, and fought in the Second Battle of Ramla, where he was captured. He was not executed because of his connection to Emperor Alexius, but was instead imprisoned in Ascalon and later Cairo. Alexius arranged for him to be released. On his way home, Odo visited Pope Paschal II in Rome, and at the Pope's suggestion he became a monk at Cluny, which may have been necessary because had sold all his property before the crusade. He became prior of La Charité-sur-Loire around 1107, and added the revenues of numerous other properties to the monastery, including one in Anatolia donated by Emperor Alexius.

Odo's capture was incorporated into the Crusade cycle of epic poetry, in the section known as Les Chétifs ("the captives"). He is the only historical figure in Les Chétifs but he also appears in other parts of the cycle with historical crusaders such as Godfrey of Bouillon.

== Sources ==
- Giles Constable, "The three lives of Odo Arpinus: Viscount of Bourges, crusader, monk of Cluny", in Crusaders and Crusading in the Twelfth Century (Ashgate, 2008).
- Jonathan Shepherd, "The 'muddy road' of Odo Arpin from Bourges to La Charité-sur-Loire", in The Experience of Crusading, vol. 2 (Cambridge, 2003).
