= Landulf of Milan =

Landulf of Milan (Italian: Landolfo di Milano, Latin: Landulfus Mediolanensis) was a late eleventh-century historian of Milan. His work Historiae Mediolanensis contains a proportion of pure invention, as well as gross inaccuracies. He is called Landulf Senior to distinguish him from the unrelated chronicler of Milan Landulf Junior.

He was a married priest and opponent of the Gregorian Reform and the local Patarenes. He travelled to France to study: to Orléans in 1103, to Paris to study with William of Champeaux in 1107-7, and to Laon.

His chronicle begins in 374 and concludes in 1083. There is a complete Italian translation by Alessandro Visconti.
