= Anselmo della Pusterla =

Anselmo della Pusterla was the Archbishop of Milan, as Anselm V, from 30 June 1126 to his deposition early in 1135. He died on 14 August 1136.

Like most young Milanese of his day, Anselm went to France for his education. He studied at Paris and Tours in 1107 and then under the great Anselm at Laon in 1109.

As archbishop, Anselm opposed the papacy in favour of an imperialist policy which preserved the traditional freedoms of the Ambrosian diocese. This put him at odds with the citizens, staunch opponents of the emperor, and a schism soon developed in the church at Milan. Anselm found himself deposed early in 1135 (some sources give 1133) and travelled to Rome, where he died and was buried in the Lateran.

== Sources ==
- Landolfo Iuniore di San Paolo. Historia Mediolanensis.
- Ghisalberti, Alberto M. Dizionario Biografico degli Italiani: III Ammirato – Arcoleo. Rome, 1961.
