= Henry V, Holy Roman Emperor =

Holy Roman Emperor from 1111 to 1125

Henry V
- Imperator Romanorum
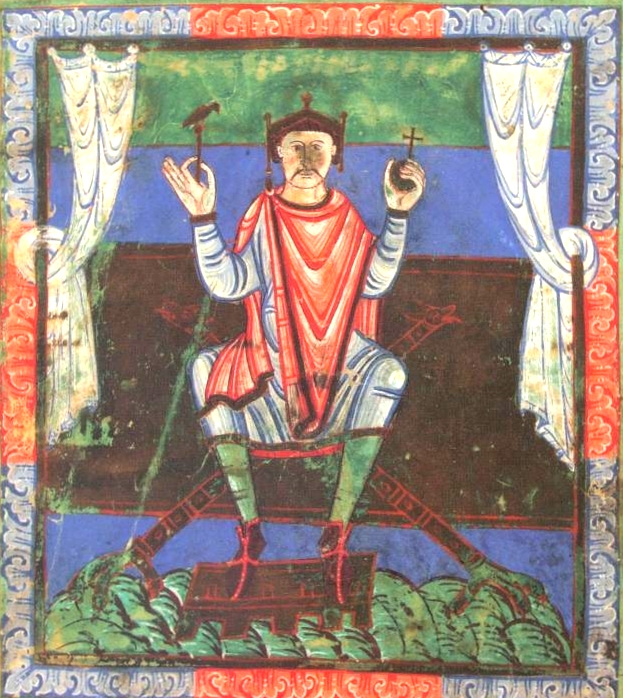
- Henry V depicted in a contemporary Gospel Book

Holy Roman Emperor
- Reign: 13 April 1111 – 23 May 1125
- Coronation: 13 April 1111
- Predecessor: Henry IV
- Successor: Lothair III

King of Burgundy
- Reign: 1105 – 23 May 1125
- Predecessor: Henry IV
- Successor: Lothair III

King of Germany (Formally King of the Romans)
- Reign: 1099 – 23 May 1125
- Predecessor: Henry IV
- Successor: Lothair III

King of Italy
- Reign: 1098 – 23 May 1125
- Predecessor: Conrad II
- Successor: Conrad III
- Born: c. 11 August 1081/1086; Goslar, Saxony
- Died: 23 May 1125 (aged 38 or 43); Utrecht
- Burial: Speyer Cathedral (body); Cathedral of Saint Martin, Utrecht (heart and bowels)
- Spouse: Matilda of England (m. 1114)
- Dynasty: Salian
- Father: Henry IV, Holy Roman Emperor
- Mother: Bertha of Savoy

Henry V (German: Heinrich V.; probably 11 August 1081 or 1086 – 23 May 1125) was King of Germany (from 1099 to 1125) and Holy Roman Emperor (from 1111 to 1125), as the fourth and last ruler of the Salian dynasty. He was made co-ruler by his father, Henry IV, in 1098.

In Emperor Henry IV's conflicts with the imperial princes and the struggle against the reform papacy during the Investiture Controversy, young Henry V allied himself with the opponents of his father. He forced Henry IV to abdicate on 31 December 1105 and ruled for five years in compliance with the imperial princes. He tried, unsuccessfully, to withdraw the regalia from the bishops. Then in order to at least preserve the previous right to invest, he captured Pope Paschal II and forced him to perform his imperial coronation in 1111. Once crowned emperor, Henry departed from joint rule with the princes and resorted to earlier Salian autocratic rule. After he had failed to increase control over the church, the princes in Saxony and on the Middle and Lower Rhine, in 1121 the imperial princes forced Henry V to consent with the papacy. He surrendered to the demands of the second generation of Gregorian reformers, and in 1122 he and Pope Callixtus II ended the Investiture Controversy in the Concordat of Worms.

== Life ==
=== Imperial crisis ===
Henry V was probably born on 11 August in 1081 or 1086. (Note: Richard Gaettens suggests the year 1086: The birth year of Heinrich V. 1081 or 1086? In: Journal for Rechtsgeschichte Germ. Dept. Vol. 79 (1962), pp. 52–71; Eduard Hlawitschka: On the birth date of Emperor Heinrich V. In: Historisches Jahrbuch Vol. 110 (1990), pp. 471–475 (he rejects 11 August as a birthday). This is contested by Peter Neumeister: dates and interpretations. When was Emperor Heinrich V. born? In: Olaf B. Rader (ed.): Turbata per aequora mundi. Thanks to Eckhard Müller-Mertens. Hanover 2001, pp. 89–97.) However, only the date of his accolade (Schwertleite) at Easter 1101 can be confirmed. This ceremony usually took place at the age of 15.

Three children of Henry IV and his wife Bertha of Savoy (died in 1087), Henry and his two older siblings, Conrad and Agnes, survived childhood; two other siblings had died early. Henry seems to have spent the first years of his life primarily in Regensburg. His mentor was Conrad Bishop of Utrecht.

At the time of Henry's birth, his father, emperor Henry IV, had already been engaged in many years of drawn out conflicts with the pope, the imperial bishops, and secular princes for the preservation of his rule. Henry IV had never paid much attention to the advice, or the rights and privileges of the landed nobility. Saxony, as the centre of resistance, was joined by the southern duchies of Bavaria, Swabia and Carinthia. These southern duchies again sought the support of Pope Gregory VII, the chief advocate of church reform ideas. Gregory's central demand was that the emperor must refrain from investing abbots and bishops, a practice that had been essential for the Imperial Church System since Emperor Otto I. Gregory VII excommunicated Henry IV in 1077. By repenting at Canossa, Henry managed to get absolved. In 1080 and 1094, however, Henry IV was excommunicated again. In 1102, the church ban was again declared over him and his party, including his son, Henry V. The conflict divided the empire from the church.

Henry IV therefore sought to strengthen his influence in the south. His daughter, Agnes, was engaged to Friedrich, who in 1079 obtained the Duchy of Swabia. The emperor also sought to secure his royal succession. Henry IV chose his eldest son, Conrad, to be his heir and arranged to have Conrad crowned king in Aachen in 1087. After Conrad defected to the Church Reform Party in Italy in 1093, his royalty and inheritance were revoked at a court in Mainz and transferred to his younger brother, Henry V, in May 1098. The latter had to take an oath never to rule over the father. On 6 January 1099, Henry V was crowned king in Aachen, where he was required to repeat the oath. His brother, Conrad, died in Florence on 27 July 1101. The continued existence of the Salian dynasty now depended on Henry V, the only living son of the emperor. The co-regency of son and father proceeded without obvious problems for six years. Contrary to previous ruling sons, Henry V was not involved in government affairs. His father's policies proceeded to be extremely cautious after the death of his older son, Conrad.

=== Assumption of power ===
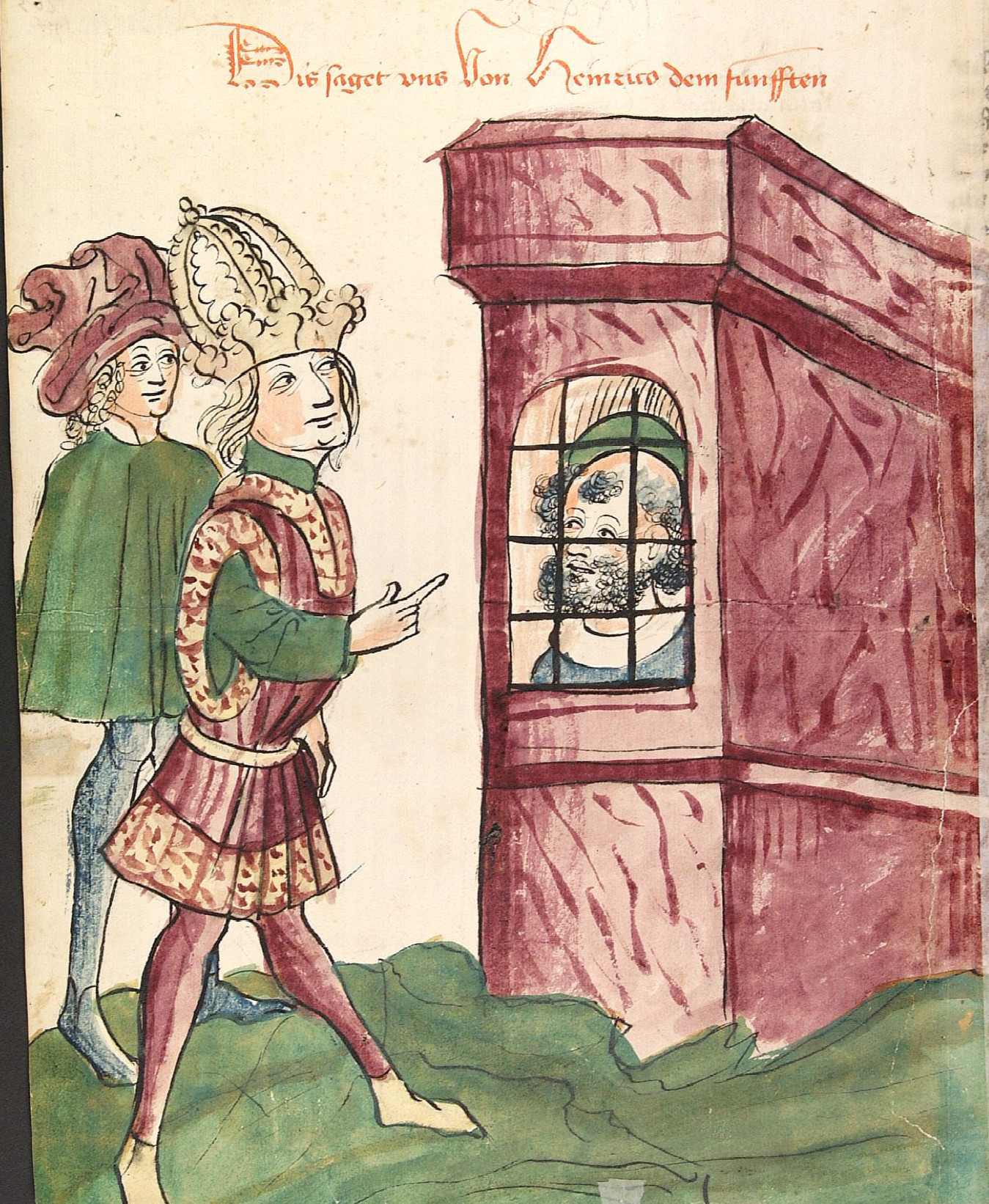
Emperor Henry V visits his father Henry IV in prison.

The causes and motives that led to the deposition of Henry IV by his son remain debated among modern researchers. Stefan Weinfurter argues that religious reform motives and the corrosive influence of a group of young Bavarian counts – Margrave Diepold III von Vohburg, Count Berengar II of Sulzbach and Count Otto II of Habsburg – are the primary causes. These nobles succeeded in convincing the young Henry V of his father's lost cause and the eventual triumph of reform. If he did not act and waited until his father died, someone else would attempt to ascend the throne and would find many supporters. Out of concern for his salvation, Henry then abandoned his father and joined the "salvation community" of the young Bavarians.

Another line of research supports the theory that the murder of Sieghard of Burghausen in February 1104 by ministerials and citizens of Regensburg was the trigger for the overthrow of Henry IV. According to Burghausen's relatives and other nobles, the emperor had failed to punish the perpetrators appropriately, proving that Henry IV viewed aristocrats with disdain. Henry V had attempted in vain to mediate an amicable settlement between Burghausen and the ministerials in the dispute that led to the murder, and he also would have had a reason to resent his father's inaction. A flaw in this theory is that there was a very long time lag between the murder of Burghausen and when Henry V turned his back on his father.

In November 1104, Henry V joined his father's army on a punitive expedition against Saxon Reformers who had opposed the election of the Archbishop of Magdeburg. On 12 December 1104, Henry V broke away from his father, thereby breaking the oath of allegiance to the ruling king. Henry V made his way to Regensburg, where he celebrated Christmas with his followers. While there, his father's enemies sought to convince him to revolt. Henry considered their arguments, but he was restrained by the oath he had taken to take no part in the business of the Empire during his father's lifetime. At the turn of the year 1104/05, he sent messengers to Rome to seek absolution from his loyalty oath by Pope Paschal II, The Pope promised Henry V, on condition that Henry be a righteous king and a promoter of the Church, not only absolution from the sin of breaking this oath, but also support in the struggle against his father.

Between 1105 and 1106, supporters of Henry IV and Henry V each disseminated arguments in letters and historiographic texts in order to build support among the people of the empire, while father and son each accused the other of disregard for the divine and earthly orders. Henry V began to strengthen his ties with Saxony, where the opposition against his father was particularly strong due in part to his absence from the duchy since 1089. In the spring of 1105, Henry V stayed in Saxony for two months and showed his willingness to work with the church on the basis of Gregorian ideas by removing the bishops, Friedrich von Halberstadt, Udo von Hildesheim, and Henry von Paderborn, who had been appointed by his father. In Quedlinburg, he entered the town barefoot on Palm Sunday, thus demonstrating his humility (humilitas), an elementary Christian virtue of rulers. His stay concluded with the celebration of the Pentecost festival in Merseburg and the confirmation of the Magdeburg metropolitan.

Henry V promised the hand of his sister, Agnes, in marriage to the Babenberger, Leopold III, thereby convincing Leopold to abandon his father's party. At the end of October 1105, Henry V arrived at Speyer, the centre of Salian rule. Here he installed Gebhard, a fervent opponent of his father, as Bishop. In the fall of 1105, the armies of father and son faced each other at the Regen river. However, a battle was prevented by the princes of both sides who wished to find a peaceful solution. At Christmas 1105, an agreement was to be reached at a diet in Mainz.

Henry IV advanced to Mainz for the announced diet. According to the Vita Heinrici IV On 20 December 1105 in Koblenz Henry V "fell around his father's neck", "shed tears and kissed him" – public expressions of reconciliation that were morally binding during the 12th century. Henry IV then disbanded and released his army as father and son left for the diet in Mainz on 21 December. On 23 December in Bingen, Henry persuaded his father to retreat to a castle for his own protection, as Archbishop Ruthard of Mainz would refuse to let him into the city. Henry agreed and was led to Böckelheim Castle, the property of Bishop Gebhard, not for his protection, but for custody. Henry was thrown into the dungeon and was held there "unwashed and unshaven and deprived of any service" over Christmas. At the Reichstag in Mainz, Henry prompted his father to hand over the imperial insignia (crown, scepter, imperial cross, holy lance and imperial sword). Henry IV then was transferred to Ingelheim where he personally was to hand over the imperial insignia and was forced to abdicate on 31 December 1105. Henry V subsequently spread the narrative in which his father had ceded the insignia and his rule to him voluntarily. This distortion of the events implied his strong desire to feign dynastic continuity.

On 5 or 6 January 1106, more than fifty imperial princes were present when Henry V was anointed and crowned king. According to the Annals of Hildesheim, Archbishop Ruthard of Mainz presented the imperial insignia with the cautionary words: "If he does not prove to be a just leader of the empire and a defender of the church, he will end like his father." The beginning of his reign was marked by a lengthy time of unusual harmony between the king and the princes. Unlike his Salian predecessors, Henry V would count his reign only from the day on which he received the imperial insignia and was chosen for royal duty by the election of the princes. The reference to Saint Mary and the divine mandate was no longer the legitimate basis for Salian rule.

However, Henry IV escaped from prison in Ingelheim and fled to Liège. His son feared a reversal of the balance of power and summoned a Reichstag for Easter 1106. Henry IV had already begun to organize resistance against his son, but suddenly died on 7 August 1106 in Liège, where he received an honorable funeral. The princes opposed a funeral in Speyer, but Henry V overruled this decision. On 24 August, he had his father's body dug up and transferred to Speyer, since in Liège some form of veneration of the deceased as a saint was about to begin. The re-burial at the Speyer crypta would imply continuity and help stabilize the position of the rebel son, who could present himself as a legitimate force of conservation and progress. On 3 September 1106 the body was once again temporarily buried in a still unconsecrated chapel north of Speyer cathedral. An appropriate funeral among his ancestors was only admissible and indeed performed in 1111 after the abolishment of Henry IV's pending excommunication.

=== Period of consensual rule ===
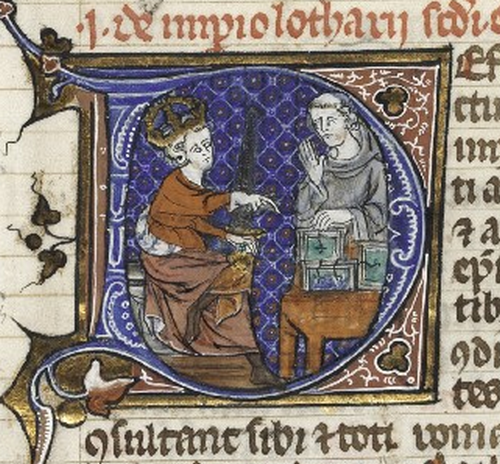
Lothair of Supplinburg who had supported Henry during his struggle with his father. Henry rewarded him generously with the land and title of the Duchy of Saxony as fief, the basis for his ascent as Henry's royal and imperial successor

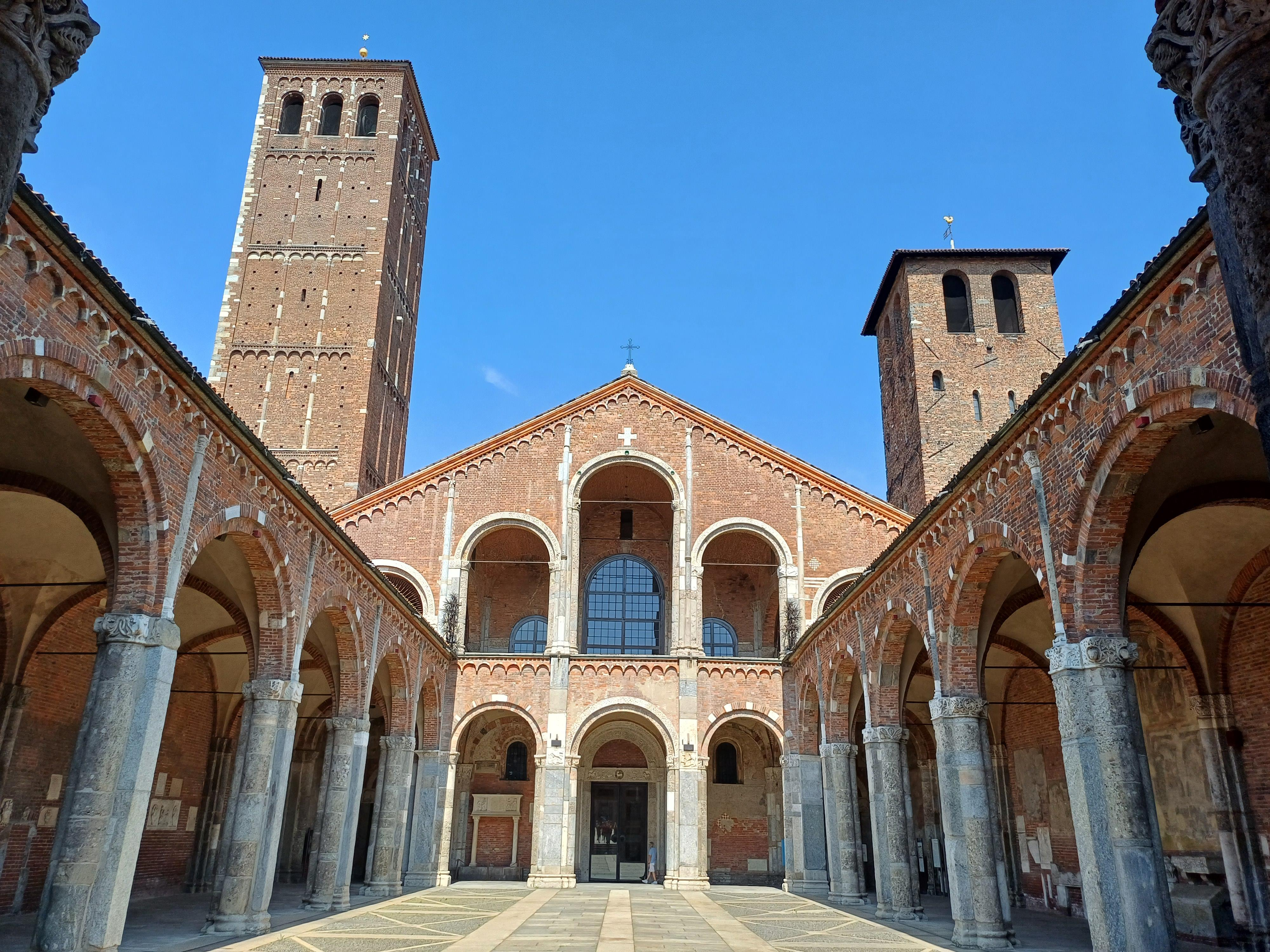
Atrium of the Basilica of Sant'Ambrogio in the city of Milan, where resentments against Imperial rule repeatedly culminated in armed conflicts

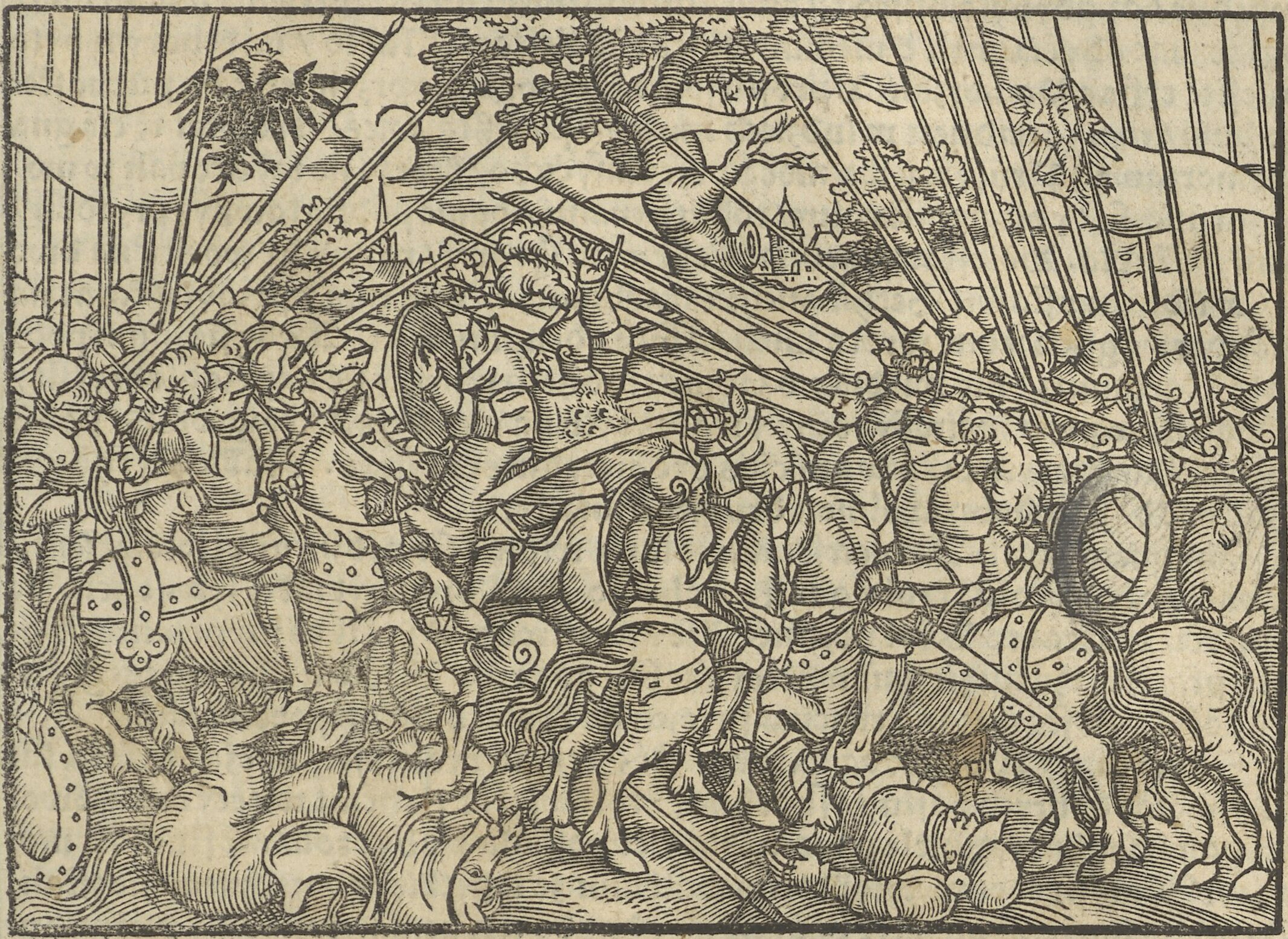
At the Battle of Hundsfeld near modern Wrocław, Duke Bolesław III confronts and triumphs over emperor Henry V, who is forced to withdraw from Poland, 24 August 1109

In spring 1106, while Henry reflects on his father's mistakes, he remarked that "disregard for the princes was the downfall of the empire." Thus, the following years of his reign were characterized by greater shared responsibilities of the princes and the sanctioning of church reforms. Documents and annals prove the consensual practice of his rule. Records of princes and nobles in royal documents, who actively take part in government affairs, increased. In several documents Henry would state that he had carried out his actions "with the judgment and advice of the princes". In order to find greater consent with the nobility he would summon diets (Hoftage). The princes' participation in great numbers at the diets and the strong increase in chroniclers' reports confirm the new sense of responsibility among the king's vassals for the empire. Henry V reinstalled the bishops who had been banned from entering their bishoprics under his father. Negotiations with the Pope now took place among representatives of the clerics and secular princes. Bishop Eberhard von Eichstätt (until his early death in 1112), Count Berengar II of Sulzbach and Count Palatine Gottfried von Calw were particularly close to the young king and are most frequently mentioned by the worldly nobles in the royal documents. Additionally, the archbishops Friedrich of Cologne and Bruno von Trier, the bishops Burchhard von Münster, Otto von Bamberg and Erlung von Würzburg and Count Hermann von Winzenburg were named remarkably often in official documents. From 1108 the Staufer Duke Friedrich II and from 1111 Margrave Hermann von Baden would frequently appear in the records.

Thanks to the consensual cooperation between the lords and the king, Henry was the first Salian ruler, who had managed to acquire unhindered access to all parts of the empire after a long time and thus able to successfully intervene in political affairs in both the western and eastern imperial estates. Henry visited Saxony several times until 1112, as his relationship with the Saxons was stable during the next years.

After the 1106 death of the last member of the Saxon Billung family line Duke Magnus, Henry did not confer the Duchy of Saxony to either of the two sons-in-law, Henry the Black or Otto of Ballenstedt, but to Lothar of Supplinburg, as reward for Lothar's support during the 1104/05 disempowerment of Henry IV. This act was enforced upon the legal body of the duchy against traditional habits of dynastic inheritance.

In 1107, Henry campaigned to restore Borivoi II in Bohemia, which was only partially successful. Henry summoned Svatopluk the Lion, who had captured Duke Borivoi. Borivoi was released at the emperor's command and appointed godfather to Svatopluk's new son. Nevertheless, on Svatopluk's return to Bohemia, he assumed the throne. In 1108, Henry went to war with Coloman of Hungary on behalf of Prince Álmos. An attack by Boleslaus III of Poland and Borivoi on Svatopluk forced Henry to give up his campaign. Instead, he invaded Poland to compel them to renew their accustomed tribute but was again defeated at the Battle of Hundsfeld. In 1110, he succeeded in securing the Duchy of Bohemia for Ladislaus I.

Imperial rule had eroded in Italy after the demise of Henry IV. For fifteen years, from October 1095 to October 1110, neither Henry IV nor Henry V had issued a single document for the Italian administration. Consequently, Italian officials saw no reason to travel to the northern part of the empire and obtain their royal documents. Under Henry V opposition to Salian rule reached its climax in the Milan metropolis.

Henry V. continued the practice of investiture with ring and staff (per anulum et baculum) and was able to maintain a working relationship with the clerical princes. Next to the staff, the ring became the symbol, that epitomized the marriage of the bishop to his church. This practice had only been introduced by emperor Henry III, yet became one of the causes for Henry IV's conflict with the Pope.

In Mainz on 7 January 1106 Conrad I was invested with ring and staff as the new Archbishop of Salzburg. In 1107, the Salians occupied the bishoprics of Halberstadt, Magdeburg, Speyer and Verdun with the expressed participation of and approval by the princes. The court chapel, the cathedral schools and the diocesan chapters of Speyer, Bamberg or Liège had lost all relevance for the Episcopal Consecration, but family ties to the high nobility. Upon the selection of the bishops, the king only sought the consent of an exclusive circle of a few noble families. These families in turn only campaigned for candidates among their own ranks, who might become important in the future expansion of their respective territories. This practice effectively promoted a clerical office, that was attainable via a hereditary selection process.

Henry's indicative bishop investiture with ring and staff did not help to solve the conflict with the papacy. Pope Paschal II eventually demanded Henry's complete renunciation of the investiture of clerics. However, the king and the bishops collaborated further as the Pope proved incapable to suppress these practices. Attempts to come to any form of agreement on the question of the investiture failed in 1106 at the Synod of Guastalla and 1107 in Châlons-en-Champagne.

=== First Italian expedition ===
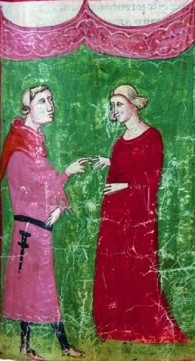
Duke Welf II of Bavaria and Matilda of Tuscany were married from 1089 to 1095.

Henry's primary concern during his reign was the settlement of the Investiture Controversy, which had caused serious setbacks for the empire during the previous imperial tenure. The papal party who had supported Henry in his resistance to his father hoped he would endorse the papal decrees, which had been renewed by Paschal II at the synod of Guastalla in 1106. The king, however, continued to invest the bishops, but wished the pope to hold a council in Germany to settle the question. After some hesitation, Paschal preferred France to Germany, and, after holding a council at Troyes, renewed his prohibition of lay investiture. The matter slumbered until 1110, when, negotiations between king and pope having failed, Paschal renewed his decrees.

At a Hoftag in August 1110 concrete plans were made for a march on Rome and arrangements to bring about an honorable end to the investiture dispute. The army chose the shortest route via the Great St Bernard Pass, reached Piacenza and Parma, then moved to Florence, arrived at Sutri in February 1111 and from there proceeded towards Rome.

Henry was imbued with ideas of an epochal event upon his departure for Italy. He signalled preparedness as he ordered a new royal seal to be made. Duke Welf II of Bavaria commanded a second column that entered Italy from the southeast of the empire and had orders to rendez-vous with the main contingent near Roncaglia. This impressive display of integrity proved that even the clans that had opposed and violently fought Henry's father were now on the Salian side. Welf's presence was particularly important for Henry as he had been married to Matilda of Tuscany from 1089 to 1095, which entitled him to inheritance claims on her vast property. Matilda allowed the troops to traverse her substantial territories in the greater part of Northern Italy, that included present-day Lombardy, Emilia, the Romagna and Tuscany.

Henry V sent envoys to Matilda in order to negotiate and complete the note: "de pace [...] de regis honore suoque" (for peace and the honor of the king [...]). This honor, that determined the rank of the king was an idea, that had developed among the latest Salians towards a concept of lordship from which also future imperial claims on Southern Italy and on Matilda's property were derived. Matilda, who in 1079 had indeed intended to bequeath all her property to the pope in the event of her childlessness, now opted for an agreement between the pope and the king, and deployed the name Henry. The way to Rome was open for the king.

Henry put great effort into documentation and into staging events favorably for the royal party. He was allegedly accompanied by a huge army of 30,000 knights from all over the empire, that according to Otto of Freising, gave an impressive display of worldly power in the nightly glow of the torches. The strength of his forces helped him to secure general recognition in Lombardy, where archbishop Grossolano intended to crown him with the Iron Crown of Lombardy. Henry could only command such a large army because his rule was based on consensus with the princes and dukes. Among the participants of this great procession was Henry's court chaplain David, who as a chronicler had been tasked to document a chronicle of all important events in volumes and in such a simple style that even less learned people can understand it. Thus, Henry had already planned the historiographic elements of documentation and propaganda, that might be useful in likely future clashes with the Pope. David's account has not survived, but the work has been used by later authors.

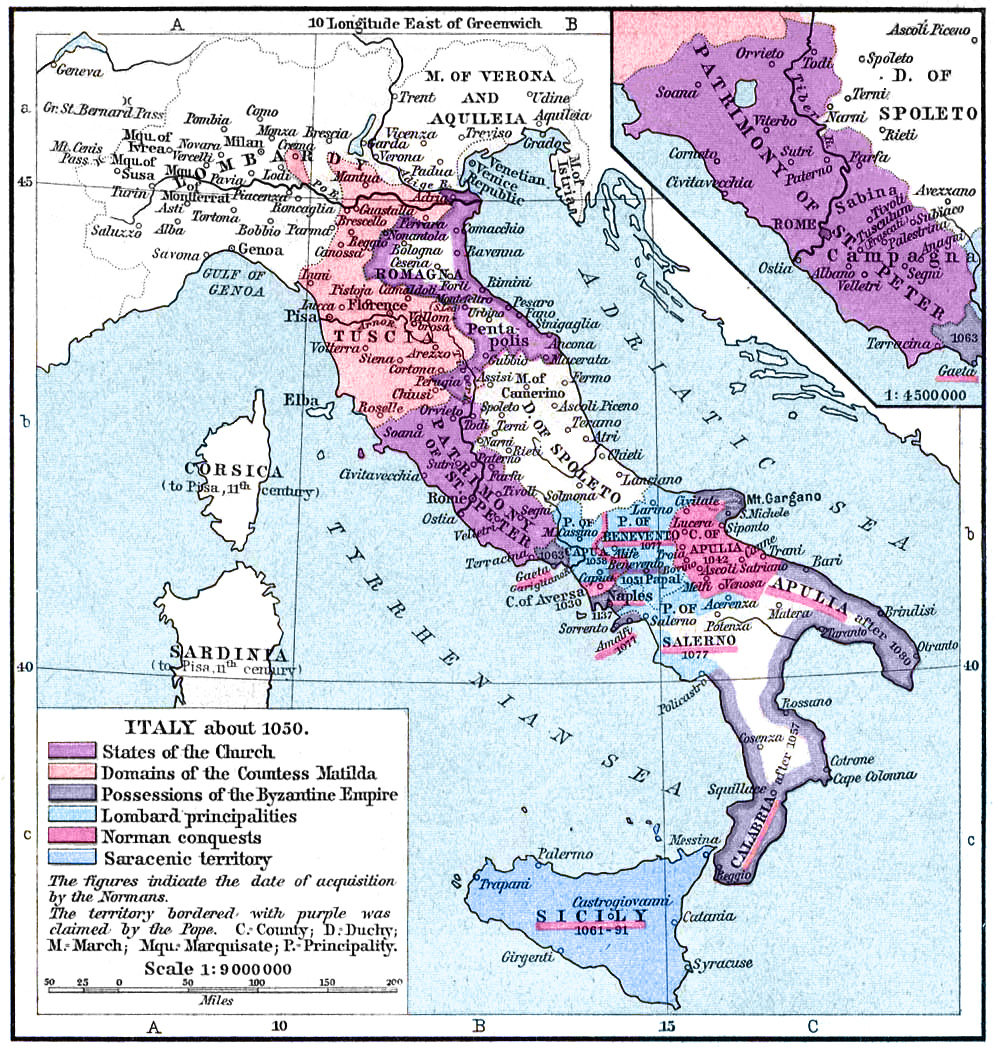
Map of Italy, around 1050

Pope Paschal, who could not count on further support from Matilda of Tuscany, sought help from the Normans who ruled in Southern Italy and with whom the papacy has been trying to counterbalance the Roman-German rulers before. The Normans had already occupied Rome against Henry IV in 1084. Roger of Apulia and Robert I of Capua pledged to assist Pope Paschal in case he needs help. Paschal also received support from the urban nobility of Rome. However, he made no attempt to gain support in northern Italy, whose municipalities began to evade the emperor. With the occupation of Lodi in 1111, Milan began to build up its own territory. The Norman army sent by Prince Robert I of Capua to rescue the papists was turned back by the imperialist count of Tusculum, Ptolemy I of Tusculum.

Henry V continued to insist on his right to invest with ring and staff as well as on the oath of fidelity for bishops and imperial abbots. Pope Paschal proposed that Henry give up the investiture altogether – the appointment of bishops to the episcopate – and in return get back all fiefs of sovereign royal regalia in the duchies and margraviates and the coin – market – and customs rights. Henry and Pope Paschal agreed on this idea in a preliminary contract on 4 February 1111. This meant that the bishops would be deprived of the rights and income that had been theirs since the Carolingian era and the means by which their service to the king was traditionally made possible and rewarded. If these regalia were returned to the empire, the bishops would have to live off their own property, the tithe, and alms, limiting them to their ministry and increasing their dependence on the Pope. They would have lost all political rights and responsibilities in the empire and be dependent on secular protection. On 9 February, Henry V accepted the papal Concordat of Sutri. For Pope Paschal, the cause of simony was not the investiture, but the secularization of the bishops.

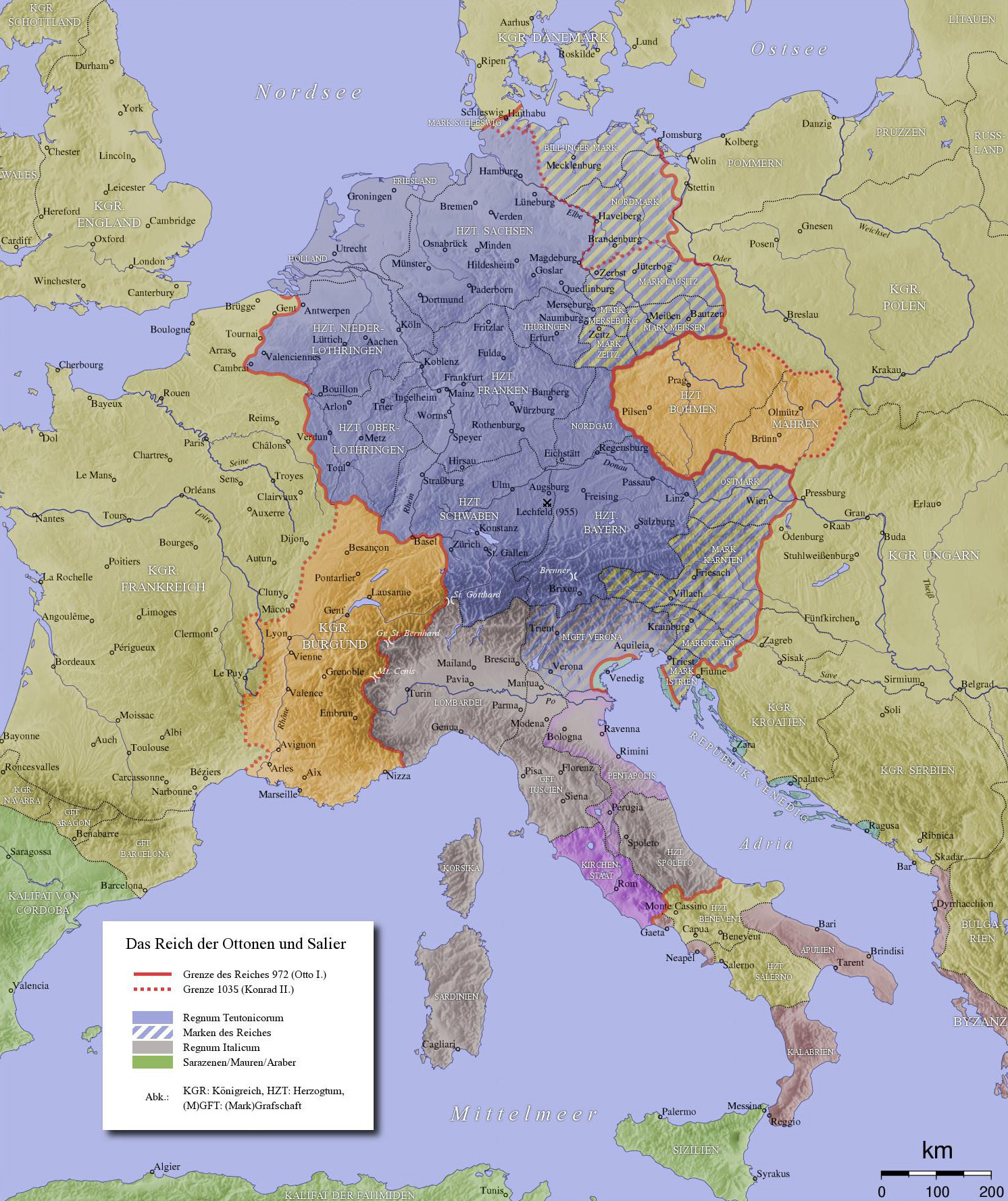
The empire during Ottonian and Salian rule (10th to 12th century)

The celebrations for the coronation began on 12 February 1111. Henry V kissed the feet of the Pope in public in front of St. Peter's Basilica. In doing so, he symbolized his subordination to the spiritual father. This ritual was mentioned in the 1111 coronation for the first time and became an official ritual in the coronation ceremonies of the future emperors before entering St. Peter's Basilica.

The bishops learned of Paschal's and Henry's agreement prior to the coronation act. Protests broke out, there was turmoil in the city itself and the coronation had to be cancelled. Henry demanded his investment rights to be reinstated and the immediate coronation. Paschal refused, and Henry seized and imprisoned him in St. Peter. After two months Henry was able to acquire his father's (Henry IV) absolution from Paschal in the Treaty of Ponte Mammolo on 12 April, and the right to invest with ring and staff. On 13 April, Paschal completed the imperial coronation. In addition, Paschal had to swear an oath never to excommunicate Henry.

Upon the Pope's imprisonment, however, Henry lost widespread acknowledgment as he had apprehended Christ's representative, the highest authority in the Latin Christian world. In response, he was banned by cardinal and legate Cuno of Praeneste at a synod in Jerusalem in the summer of 1111. In September 1112 he was excommunicated by a Burgundian synod headed by Archbishop Guido of Vienne, the future Pope Calixtus II. According to scholar Stefan Weinfurter, the year 1111 was a turning point in the reign of Henry V. The recent unity between the Reform Church and the king broke and with it the ties of consensual rule between the king and the secular princes. In March 1112, the Investiture privilege was revoked by the curia on a Lateran council and designated as depraved privilege (Pravilege).

=== Return to Germany ===
Crowned emperor, Henry quickly retreated beyond the Alps. On his return to Italy he was a guest of Matilda of Tuscany at Bianello Castle from 6 to 8 May 1111. Matilda and Henry concluded a contract that researchers interpreted as Henry V's document of inheritance in case the margravine dies. On 7 August 1111, Henry was able to finally bring about his father's funeral, who had so far rested in an unconsecrated side chapel of Speyer Cathedral. On the same day and seven days later, on 14 August (a date of significance for the liturgical commemoration of the dead) Henry granted two privileges, which endowed the citizens of Speyer with yet unprecedented civil liberties. As the first privilege lays out memorial ceremonies the privileges for the citizens of the city of Speyer are considered a milestone in the history of the emergence of civil liberties. The residents were granted numerous rights and benefits (including exemption from inheritance taxes, court taxes and property taxes). No other city in the empire was granted such extensive and far-reaching liberties at the beginning of the 12th century. These privileges highlight the changes in the Salian idea of kingship compared to the first three Salian rulers. Donations no longer applied to the clergy alone, but an entire township was committed to the Salian Memorialization. The Speyer civil liberties, legal privileges and economic advance were associated with the memory of Henry V.

The funeral ritual was of particular importance to Henry regarding the legitimization of his rule. At the funeral, he had presented himself as the loyal son and legitimate heir of the late emperor and demonstrated dynastic continuity. At the same time, he made it clear that his kingship was based not only on his successful rebellion against the father and the approval of the princes, but also on his inheritance claim to the throne. The city of Worms was also granted generous privileges in 1114, however, unlike in Speyer, the residents were not granted any personal freedoms.

=== Breach of the consensual order and war with Cologne ===
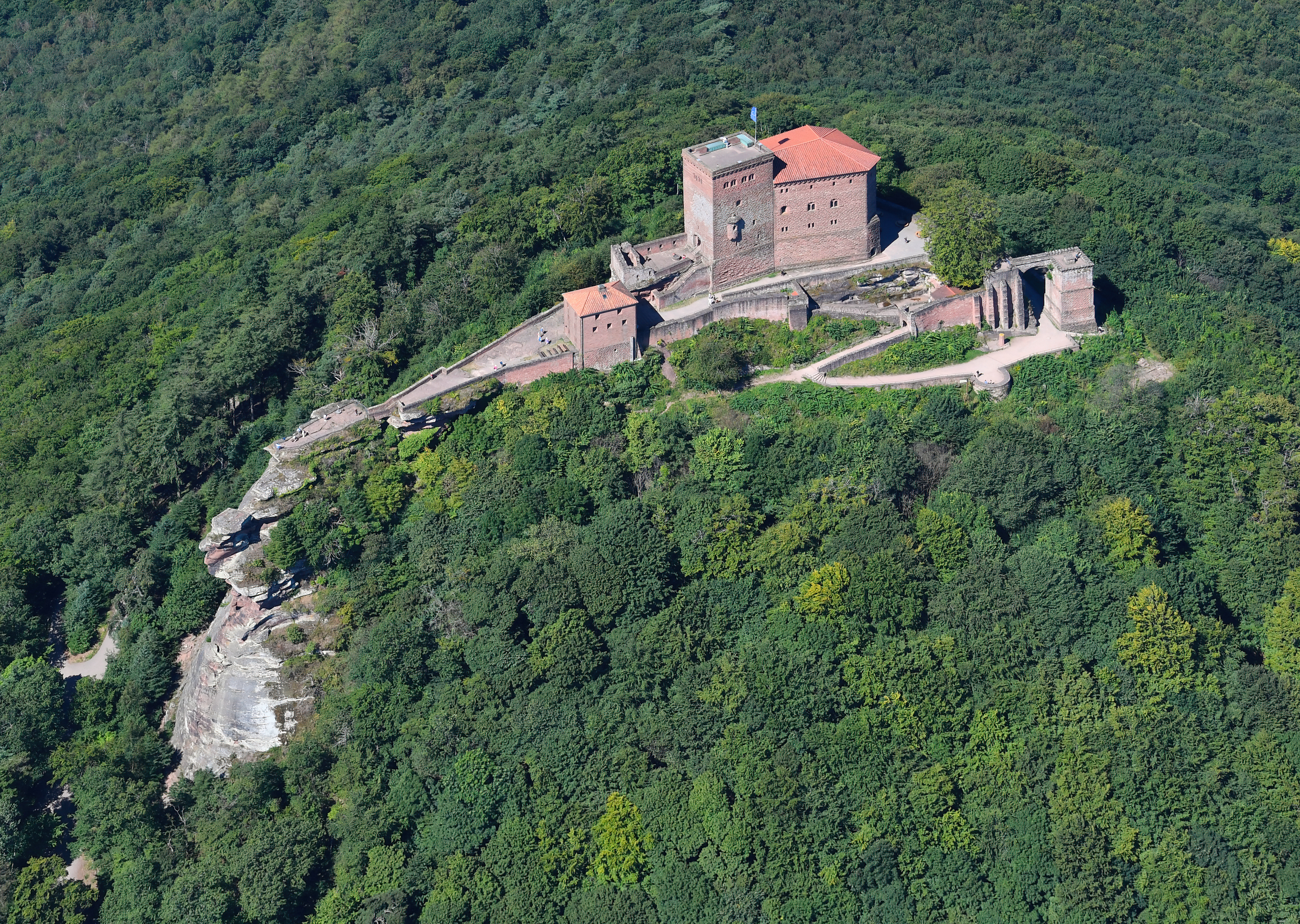
Trifels Castle near the modern small town of Annweiler. Henry V ignored property claims of Adalbert of Saarbrücken and declared it a Reichsburg (Imperial Castle) in 1113. The site served as depository of the imperial regalia during the 12th and 13th century.

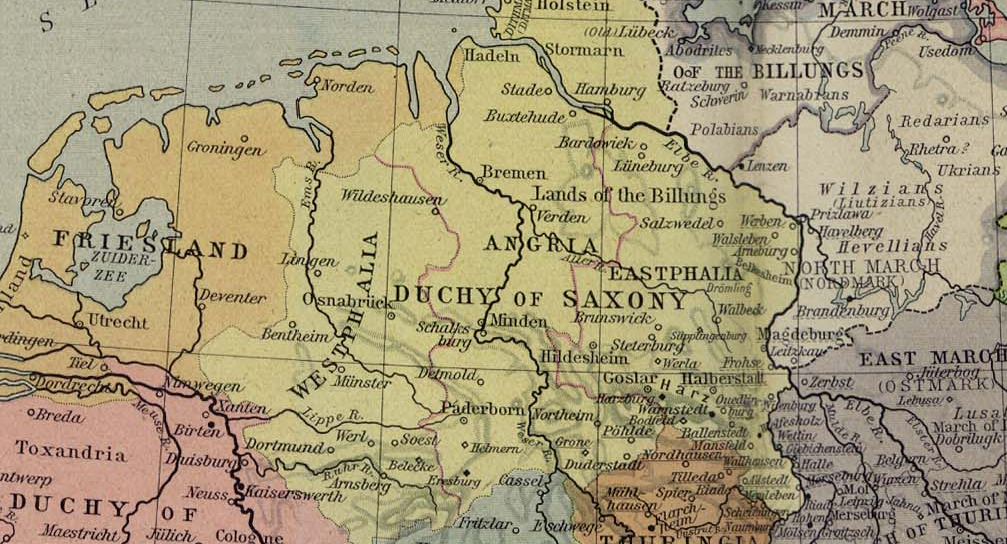
The Duchy of Saxony 919–1125, Historical Atlas by William R. Shepherd, 1923

Beginning in 1111, Henry increasingly bypassed the princely consensus for his actions and hardly received any approval. He even applied his father's autocratic forms of government, thus exacerbating the conflict. After the events of 1111, numerous clergymen fell away from him, including first Archbishop Conrad I of Salzburg, Bishop Reinhard of Halberstadt and most significant the break with his long-time confidant Adalbert of Saarbrücken, imperial chancellor since 14 February 1106, who had greatly influenced imperial politics. Adalbert was appointed Archbishop of Mainz in 1109 and accompanied Henry on the Italian campaign of 1110/11. In the process of the consolidation and expansion of power, the possessions of the Mainz Church overlapped with the Salian imperial estate at the Middle Rhine. The conflict with Adalbert apparently arose over Trifels Castle. Without gaining the consensus of the princes, Henry arrested and detained Adalbert for over three years. Among threats of violence and dissent the Mainz citizens only succeed in November 1115 the archbishop (starved to skin and bones) to be released. The customs of amicable conflict resolution and demonstrative gentleness that had been handed down from the Ottonian era had lost importance under Henry IV and Henry V. Rather, the Salian rulers sought to establish a concrete form of royal punishment. Adalbert became the great opponent of the Salian kingship.

Property disputes also led to conflicts in Saxony, as Henry interfered with the princely territorial policy while trying to expand the Salian domain. In 1112, Lothair of Supplinburg, Duke of Saxony, rebelled against Henry but was quickly subdued. In 1113, after the death of the childless Count Ulrich Margrave of Carniola, numerous Saxon nobles laid claims to this estate. However, Henry had obviously decided that the bequest would fall to the empire if there were no direct heirs. The king's idea nonetheless contradicted the Saxon legal concept and Henry obtained the endowment through approval of the royal princes but he completely avoided any dialogue with the Saxon nobles. Lothair, who rose in arms again was defeated at the Battle of Warnstadt, though was later pardoned.

Archbishop Frederick of Cologne also broke with Henry during a campaign against the Frisians, who refused to pay the annual tribute and Henry allegedly sacrificed a Cologne troop contingent to the Frisians. The citizens of Cologne complained about the draconian regiment of one of Henry's ministerials and Archbishop Friedrich denounced the catastrophic condition of the church in a letter. The episcopal seats of Worms and Mainz remained vacant for years and the secular rights of the bishops were carried out by royal administrators (villici). The territorial princes complained as well. From 1113 Henry had begun to adopt the Salian practice of occupation, when for the first time, Burchhard, a court chaplain was installed as governor of the Diocese of Cambrai during the same year. The appointment of Bruning as Bishop of Hildesheim and Gerhard as Bishop of Merseburg also failed to achieve consent with the Saxon nobility.

The insurgents united behind the Archbishop of Cologne and collectively fell from the emperor in early 1114. Two imperial campaigns against the dissidents failed. Initially, Henry took the fortified town of Deutz, which lay across the Rhine from Cologne. His control of Deutz allowed him to cut Cologne off from all river trade and transportation. At this point, the citizens of Cologne assembled a large force, including bowmen, and crossed the river, formed their ranks, and prepared to meet Henry's army. The Cologne bowmen were able to break the armor of Henry's soldiers; it was summer, the weather was sultry, and the soldiers had removed their armor to find relief from the heat. Henry subsequently withdrew, turned south, and sacked Bonn and Jülich. On his return to Deutz, he was met by Archbishop Frederick, Duke Gottfried of Lorraine, Henry of Zutphen, and Count Theodoric of Aar, Count Gerhard of Julich (William I), Lambert of Mulenarke, and Eberhard of Gandernol, who put up a stout resistance in which the latter was killed. Theodoric, Gerhard, and Lambert were taken prisoner. When Frederick, Count of Westphalia, arrived with his brother, also named Henry, and their substantial force, the emperor withdrew, barely escaping capture. Finally, in October 1114, the two armies met on a plain near Andernach. After an initial skirmish in which Duke Henry of Lorraine was forced to withdraw, the insurgent's troops and the emperor's force of Swabians, Bavarians, and Franconians clashed. The young men of Cologne, including many journeymen and apprentices, created a fearful din of noise, slashing at all who came near them. Theodric threw his force into the fight, and the emperor's army was forced back. The defeat at Andernach ended Henry's presence at the Lower Rhine.

At Christmas 1114, unrest culminated in Saxony. On 11 February 1115, Duke Lothair eventually defeated Henry in the Battle of Welfesholz, that ended Salian rule in Saxony. From then on Lothair maintained a near royal rule in Saxony, while Henry's power to uphold universal kingship decreased further. The lack of acceptance and loss of prestige reflected itself at the court as none of the princes attended the Hoftag on 1 November 1115 in Mainz. Scheduled court days had to be cancelled in advance due to the lack of confirmed participants. Henry celebrated Christmas of 1115, one of the most essential occasions of royal representation, in Speyer, surrounded by only a few faithful adherents among whom Duke Frederick II of Swabia gained increasing significance. Simultaneously, Henry's opponents gathered in Cologne upon the invitation of Adalbert of Mainz, to discuss clerical issues.

The 1111 events in Rome and the 1115 defeat at the hands of the Saxon opposition led to the near complete dissolution of all ties between the bishops and the king. While under Henry IV a third of all documents had been issued for the bishoprics, this amount declined to a mere twelfth of Henry V's documents in which only thirteen of all 38 bishoprics were addressed.

Henry's position in Bavaria remained uncontested. After a short stop in 1111 on his return from Italy, he was absent until 1121. The conflicts in Saxony and the Rhineland required lengthy presence in these regions. Nevertheless, the Duchy of Bavaria remained loyal and Henry's opponents failed to assert themselves in Bavaria while the Bavarian nobles attended Henry's court throughout the empire. Despite the events of 1111 and the clashes in 1115, Berengar II of Sulzbach, Diepold III, Margrave of Vohburg, count Engelbert II of Spanheim as well as his brother Hartwig, Bishop of Regensburg and Hermann, Bishop of Augsburg proved to be loyal supporters of Henry V. These nobles received extraordinary treatment for their services. Engelbert II acquired the March of Istria and in 1124 the Duchy of Carinthia.

=== Marriage to Matilda of England (1110) ===
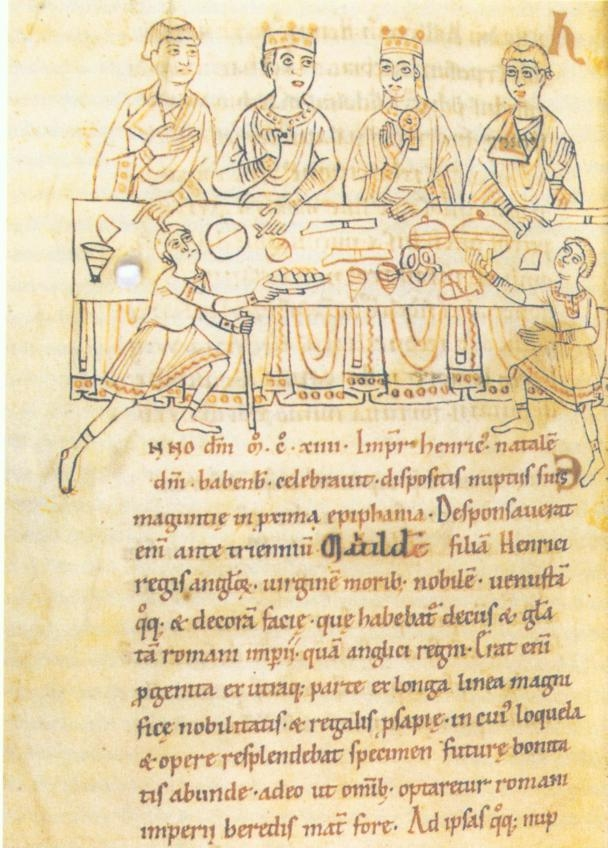
Wedding banquet of Henry V. and Matilda of England. (Chronicle of Ekkehard of Aura, Corpus Christi College, Cambridge)

From 1108 on Henry V made official proposals for a marriage with a princess of the English royal family, seeking to increase the authority of the Salian king and secure his throne. His engagement with the eight-year-old princess Matilda took place in Utrecht at Easter of 1110. The Anglo-Norman King Henry I of England paid the extraordinarily high sum of 10,000 or 15,000 pounds of silver as dowry. In return, his daughter's marriage to Henry V enormously increased his prestige. On 25 July 1110 Matilda was crowned Roman-German Queen in Mainz by the Archbishop of Cologne. Four years later the wedding celebrations also took place in Mainz on 7 January 1114 amid great splendor and the attention of princes from all over the empire. The Salians appropriated the occasion to reaffirm unanimity with the imperial nobles after the conflicts in recent years. Duke Lothair of Supplinburg appeared barefoot and in penitent clothing at the wedding. He was forgiven for his participation in the inheritance disputes of Carniola after performing a Deditio (submission). This occasion is the only known case of a Deditio during Henry V's reign, which historians have compared to the amicable set of rules and conflict management and settlement of the Ottonian dynasty. On the other hand, Henry had Count Louis of Thuringia captured and imprisoned for his participation in the Saxon rebellion, which upset many princes. Henry's impertinent demonstrations of power greatly diminished the overall atmosphere of the festivity. Some princes left the festival without permission, as others used the opportunity for conspiracies.

The marriage to Matilda produced no male heirs. The chronicler Hériman of Tournai mentions a child of Henry and Matilda that died soon after birth. A single source mentions a daughter of Henry named Bertha, who was probably illegitimate. She married Count Ptolemy II of Tusculum in 1117. The emperor's bond with the nobility of Rome through marriage was unique. In his conflict with the Pope and the struggle for domination in Italy, the Tusculan marriages of imperial partisans would receive particular honor.

Eventually, affairs in Italy compelled Henry to leave and appoint duke Frederick II of Hohenstaufen and his brother Conrad, the future king Conrad III as administrators.

=== Second Italian expedition ===
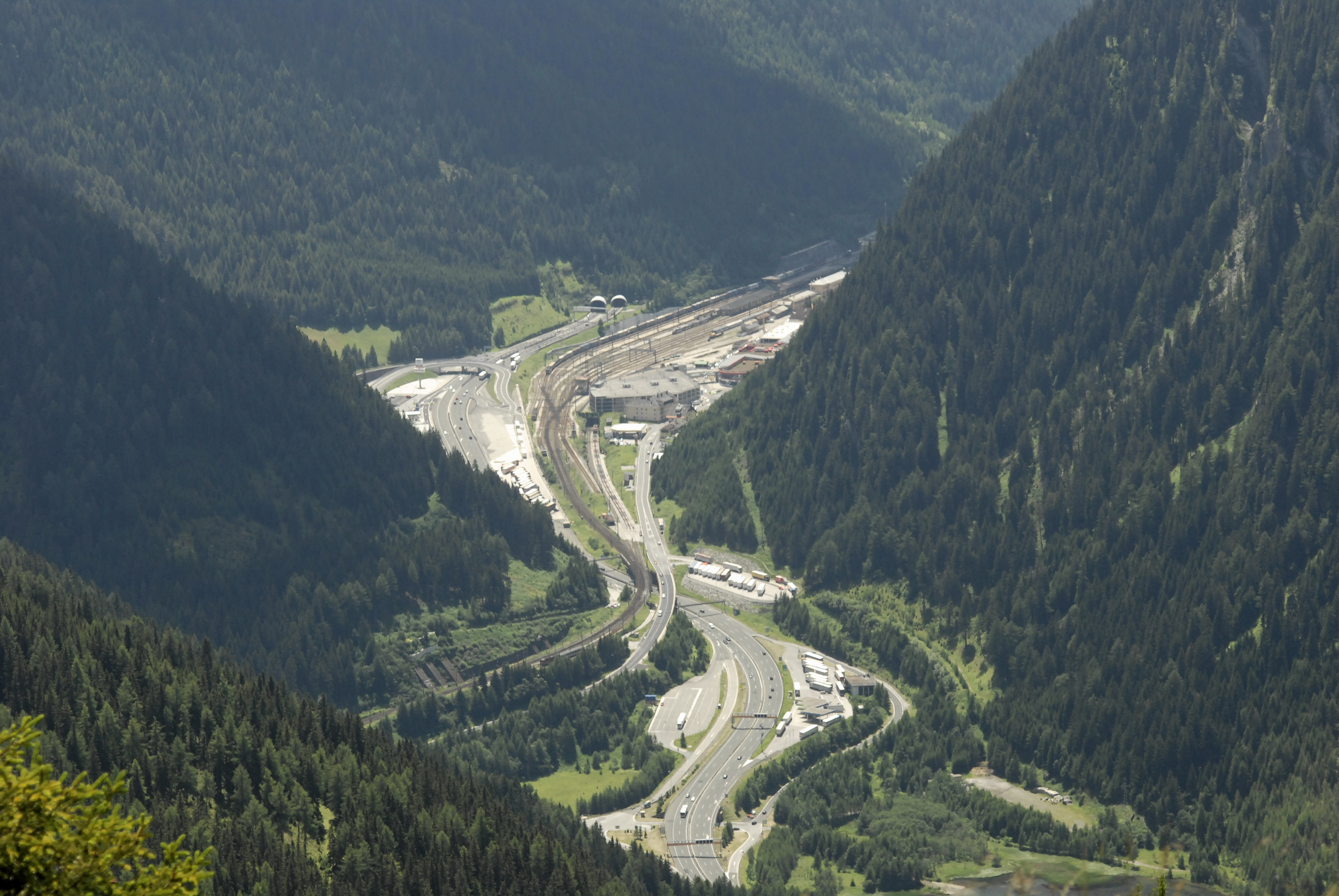
The Brenner Pass, the preferred eastern Alpine crossing during the Middle Ages, seen from the north

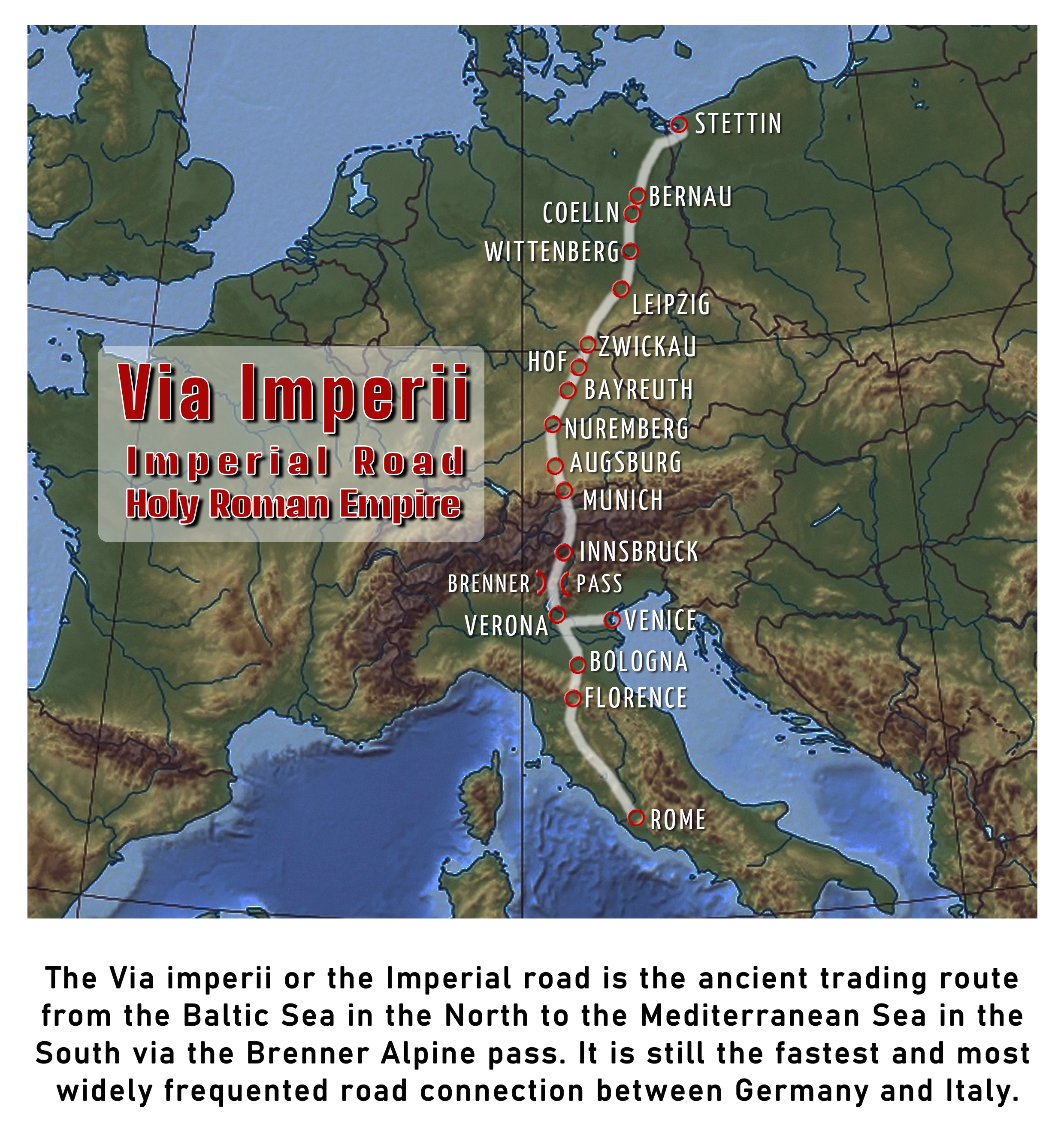
Route of the Via Imperii

After Henry had departed from Rome in 1111, a council declared the privilege of the lay investiture to be invalid. Guido, Archbishop of Vienne, excommunicated the emperor, and called upon the pope to ratify the verdict. Paschal, however, refused to take so extreme a step. The discord entered a new stage in 1115 when Matilda of Tuscany died. Matilda's death on 24 July 1115 caused Henry, accompanied only by a small contingent, to leave for Italy in February 1116 in order to secure his inheritance of the enormous property complex in Upper and Central Italy. In addition, he wished to stabilize Salian rule in Northern Italy and create a new power base against the overpowering opposition in the northern part of the empire. He had issued a whole series of court documents in advance, with which he intended to present himself as guarantor of law and justice in Italy. Henry was able to obtain Matilda's property without any problems and his authority was accepted in all the Italian municipalities. Henry regarded Rome as to be of particular importance and, ardently welcomed, he honored the city with five visits, more than any other Salian king.

Pope Paschal died on 21 January 1118. Henry helped to appoint Archbishop Mauritius of Braga as Pope Gregory VIII. At that time Braga served as the residence city of the newly emerging Kingdom of Portugal and the local archbishopric had only been founded recently. However, Gregor was unable to best his competitor Pope Gelasius II. After a banishment of Henry by papal legates around Jordan, Archbishop of Milan had only limited effects, Gelasius II himself banished the emperor. For a forthcoming Hoftag in Würzburg and during Henry's absence the royal princes planned the restoration of Imperial Peace and the deposition of the king in the event of his prolonged absence. Henry abruptly broke off the Italian campaign in the fall of 1118 and returned to the north. His wife Matilda remained in Italy as deputy ruler. Henry was able to prevent the court day in Würzburg. However, his subsequent activities until September/October 1119 cannot be determined due to the lack of sources. The feeble compliance with his reign is obvious by the lack of royal documents and the nearly unknown itinerarium of Henry's court, since apparently nobody ever requested any of these documents.

=== Concordat of Worms ===
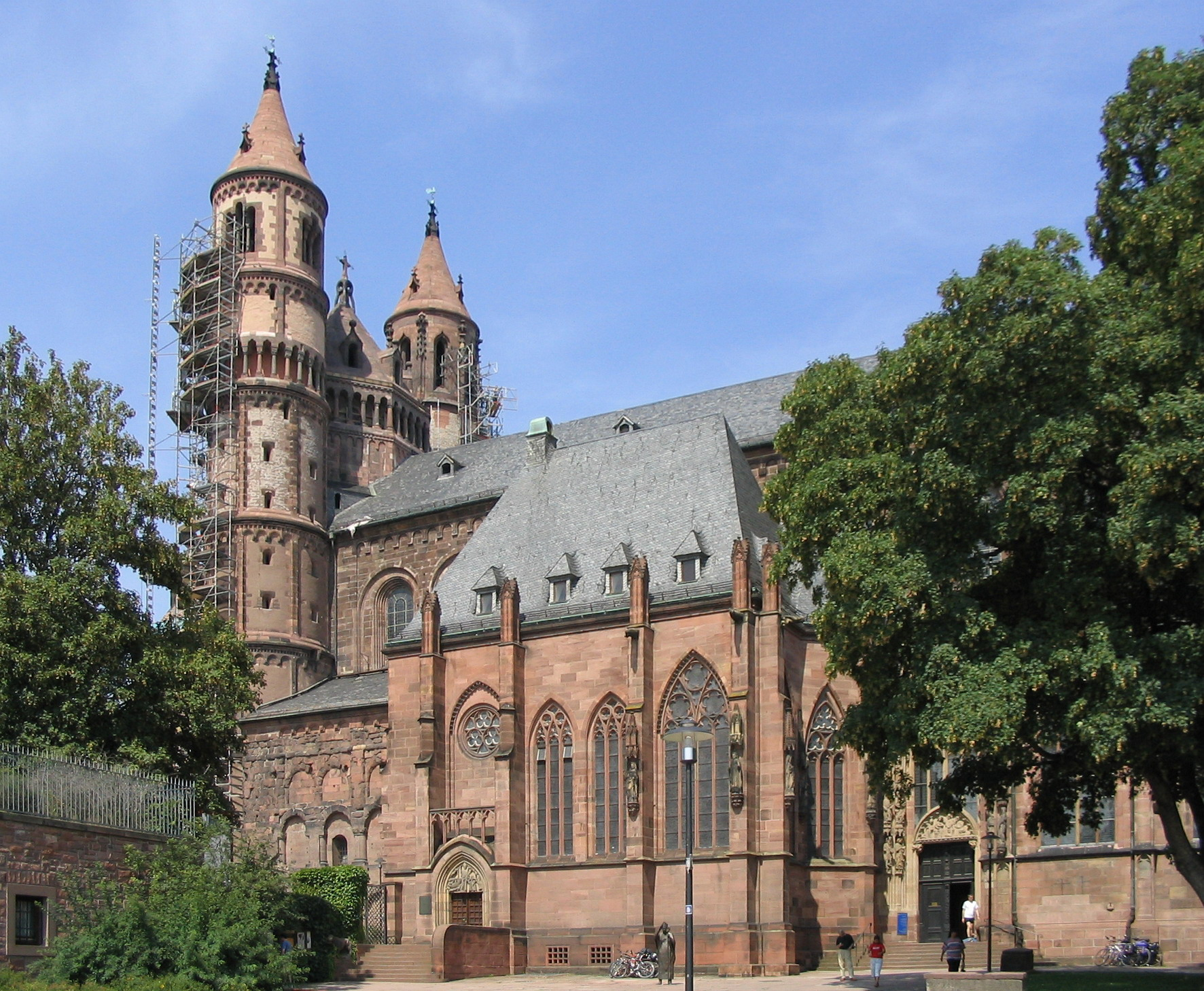
Worms Cathedral was only consecrated 12 years prior in 1110

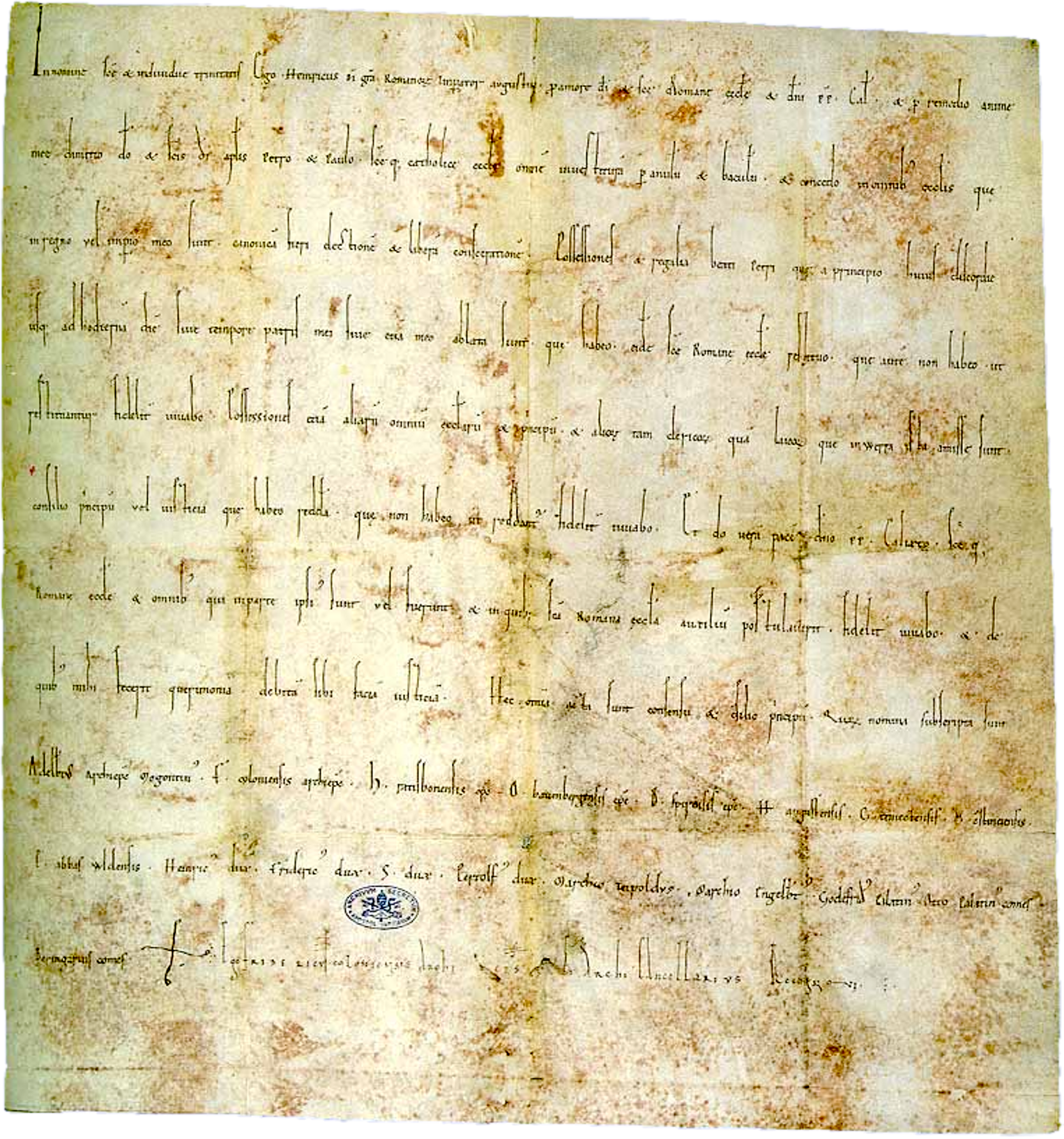
Imperial document (Heinricianum), issued on 23 September 1122 (Città del Vaticano, Archivio Segreto Vaticano)

After the second Italian expedition, the opposition in Germany was gradually crushed, and a general peace was declared at Tribur, while the desire for a settlement of the investiture dispute was growing.

On 2 February 1119, Pope Callixtus II took over the pontificate. On 24 October 1119, the Pope and Emperor again negotiated a settlement in the investiture dispute in Mouzon on the Meuse. Henry only wished to make extensive commitments with the consent of the princes. The negotiations failed. The encounter at Reims in October 1119 is considered the "end and turning point of royal penance in Medieval Europe". During the negotiations on the solution of the ban, Henry V found it hard, even unbearable to submit to a reconciliation ritual and meet the Pope bare-footed. After his father's walk to Canossa in 1077, the ideas of penitence and the personal exposure within one's social status could no longer be reconciled by another papal ban, as the intrinsic meanings symbolized subordination to the Pope. It is, however not certain whether the negotiations failed due to those circumstances. Only upon the conclusion of the Worms Concordat in 1122 was Henry re-admitted without penance or submission to the ecclesial community by a papal legate. After the negotiations had failed, Pope Callixtus conferred the honor of papal legacy to the Archbishop Adalbert of Mainz, and thus strengthened the opposition to Henry.

In 1121 the situation escalated again and Henry decided to launch a military campaign against Adalbert of Mainz. The Archbishop mobilized large contingents, largely from Saxony, for the defense of Mainz. As the two armies faced each other near the city, the commanding princes of both sides began negotiations and in autumn 1121 urged the emperor to make peace and seek balanced policies with regards to the Pope. This princely action was an important developmental step towards the establishment of consensual forms of rule as the princes acted cooperatively to bring about negotiations that end the conflict. A princely peace commission composed of equal numbers was appointed. Made up of twelve supporters and twelve opponents of Henry, the committee intended to represent all imperial estates. The princely assembly, that chronicler Ekkehard of Aura called a gathering of many "heads of the state" (tot capita rei publicae) met on 29 September 1121 in Würzburg and forced the emperor to finally reconcile with the pope.

Thus, on 23 September 1122 the so-called Concordat of Worms came about. Callixtus II, was represented by Cardinal Lambert, Bishop of Ostia. The particular clauses of the Concordat were negotiated among the princes. The mutual exchange of two documents, an imperial (Heinricianum) and a papal (Calixtinum) paper marked the official settlement of the investiture dispute between pope and emperor. Upon future bishop ordinations, a distinction was to be made between the temporalities (secular property and prerogatives) and the spiritualities (spiritual authority). The episcopal ordination was to be performed by "the clergy and the people". The Heinricianum, explicitly classified as a political work of the princes ruled that Henry was to end the practice of investment with ring and staff. The king was to restore all church property, is no longer the sole representant of the empire and rules henceforth in sync with the princes. The Calixtinum allowes the emperor to be present at the ordination of bishops and abbots. Henry is only allowed to grant the royal regalia to the newly elected with his scepter. The final consecration was to be performed by the Metropolitan for bishops and by the bishops for the abbots. Henry, who had been solemnly excommunicated at Reims by Callixtus in October 1119, abandoned his former papal nominee, Gregory VIII and is again received into the community of the Roman church.

=== Campaign in France ===
The marriage ties with the English royal dynasty involved Henry into the Franco-Norman conflict in 1123. Henry I of England asked his son-in-law for military support in his struggle for dominance in Normandy. Like Louis VI of France, Henry V had vague designs on the Low Countries and an invasion in Northern France would enable him to strengthen his position in Flanders. In August 1124 Henry V began preparations for a campaign into France with very limited ducal support. The attack spurred a hitherto unknown patriotic feeling of unity in France, which the French King Louis VI utilized for the deployment of a massive army against which Henry V's forces represented no match, according to French chronicles. The campaign was abandoned near Metz and Henry returned to Germany, where an uprising at the city of Worms was underway. However, the campaign had diverted Louis VI's support from rebel forces opposing Henry I in Normandy. Without such support, the rebellion was defeated by Henry I's household knights at Bourgthéroulde. The extent of Henry V's ambitions beyond this distraction is unclear.

== Death and succession ==
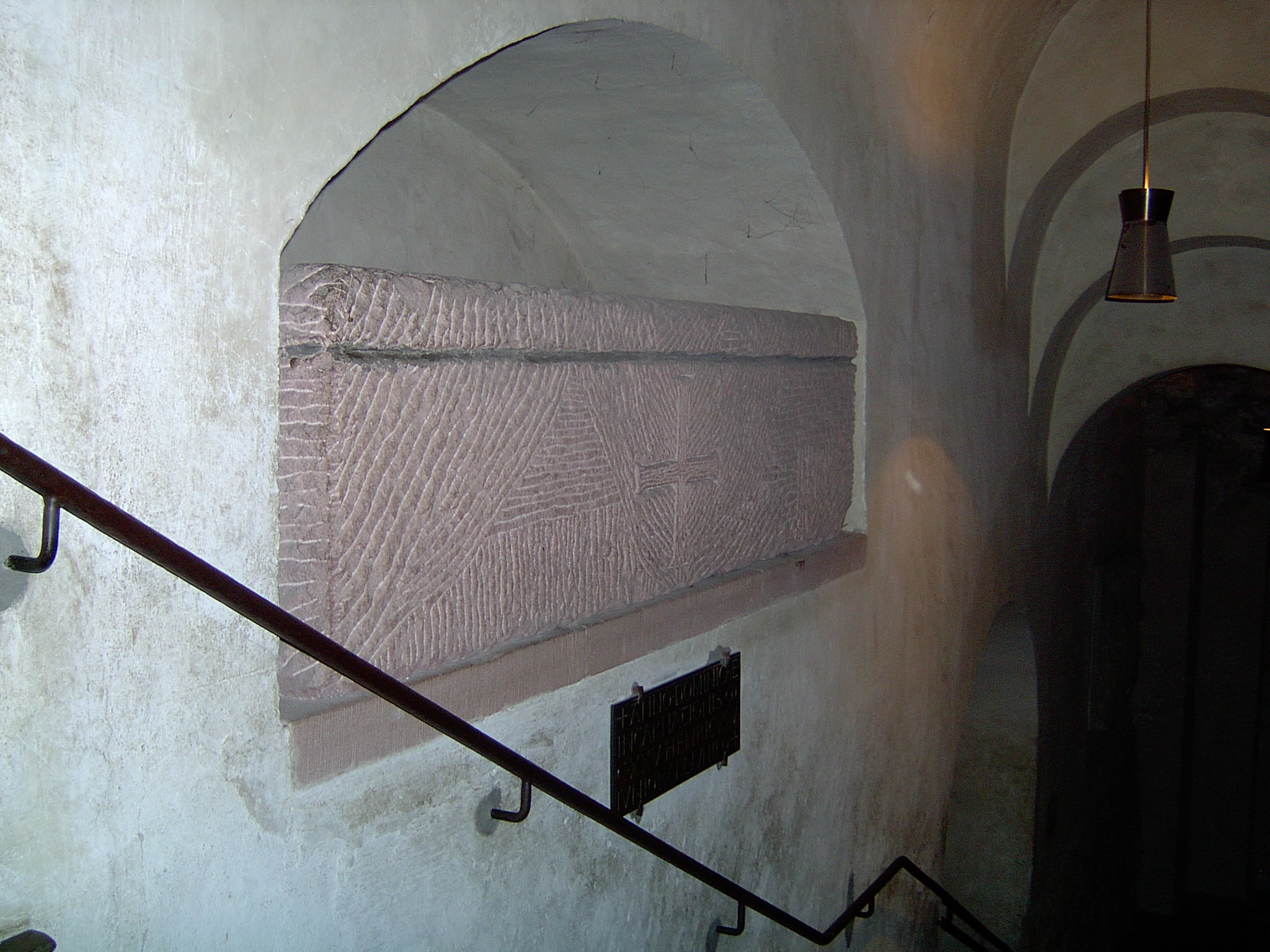
Henry V's tomb, Cathedral of Speyer

During his last years the emperor was occupied with a campaign in Flanders and the succession of the margraviate of Meissen, two disputes in which his opponents were aided by Lothair of Saxony. On 23 May 1125, Henry died of disease in Utrecht. His bones are buried at Speyer, his heart and bowels are buried at the Cathedral of Saint Martin, Utrecht. On his deathbed, he entrusted the care of his wife Matilda and having no legitimate children he left his possessions to his sororal nephew, Frederick II of Hohenstaufen. Upon his death the dynastic line of the Franconian, Salian emperors went extinct.

Speyer's importance as the Salic memorial site soon declined and it took several generations until it became a royal burial site again. The emperor's long tenure of excommunication was probably the reason that only Gladbach, a reform monastery under Siegburg domain, and the Niederaltaich Imperial Abbey have adopted Henry V's memorial service.

Matilda handed the imperial insignia to the Archbishop of Mainz and in September 1126 she returned to England. The Hohenstaufer Duke Friedrich II had been considered a promising candidate for royal succession due to his kinship with Heinrich V and his involvement in the efforts towards imperial unification. However, his candidacy at the Mainz electoral assembly on 24 August 1125 was unsuccessful since he refused to accept free elections (libera electio) of the princes and he further destroyed his chances due to his overconfidence of victory, which was generally perceived as haughty (ambicone cecatus). Further royal candidates were Leopold III, Margrave of Austria, Charles I, Count of Flanders and the Saxon Duke Lothar III, who was eventually elected. Legitimacy was no longer determined by inheritance, but through election by the imperial princes.

== Judgement ==
King Henry's ruthless maneuvers and the incarceration of the pope in 1111 initiated a general change of perception. The arrest of an elder was no longer regarded as a commendable act of the disempowerment of a schismatic ruler, but viewed under the aspect of betrayal of the biological father. Archbishop Adalbert of Mainz characterized the immediate reign of Henry V as "oppression" of "church and empire" and the upcoming "election" should bring "freedom" to the church and "peace" to the people.

French ecclesiastical sources in particular consistently judged Henry negatively, stylized him as a troublemaker and as a traitor or tyrant. For the French abbot Suger of Saint-Denis, Henry was a troublemaker, who died justly within a year of his attack on France in 1124. For Suger, national standards did not matter, but the souvereign's attitude towards the pope constituted the decisive component for his judgment. For Geoffrey of Vendôme Henry was the incarnation of Judas and Richard of Cluny asserted that his childlessness was the just punishment for the betrayal of his father. For Hériman of Tournai, Henry was guilty of planned betrayal and treachery in Rome ("proditio et perfidia diu premeditata"), who behaved like a tyrant. The 1111 events in Rome were discussed throughout all Latin Christianity. The French annals often only mention the imprisonment of the pope by Henry. The events of 1111 also echoed into the far west of Europe. The Breton Chronicon Kemperlegiense of the Quimperlé monastery mentioned an "emperor" for the very first time among its record on the capture of the pope: "Emperor Henry came to Rome, captured Paschal by treason and forced him to take an oath".

== See also ==
- Family tree of the German monarchs – he was related to every other king of Germany

== Sources ==
- Chibnall, Marjorie. The Empress Matilda: Queen Consort, Queen Mother and Lady of the English. Blackwell Publishers Inc, ISBN 0-631-15737-9, 1991.
- Kleinhenz, Christopher. Medieval Italy: an encyclopedia, Volume 1. Routledge, 2004.
- Weinfurter, Stefan. Canossa: die Entzauberung der Welt C.H. Beck ISBN 978-3-406-53590-1. 2006
- Weinfurter, Stefan. "Das Jahrhundert der Salier (1024–1125) Seite 175". Thorbecke Verlag, ISBN 978-3799501408. 2004
- Althoff, Gerd. "Noch einmal zu den Vorwürfen gegen Heinrich IV. Genese, Themen, Einsatzfelder" University of Heidelberg
- Schneidmüller, Bernd; Weinfurter, Stefan. Die deutschen Herrscher des Mittelalters. C.H. Beck. ISBN 978-3-406-50958-2. 2003
- Lubich, Gerhard. "Heinrich V. in seiner Zeit" (PDF). Regesta
- Stürner, Wolfgang. Die Staufer: Eine mittelalterliche Herrscherdynastie. Kohlhammer Verlag. ISBN 978-3-17-035365-7. 2019
- Holland, A. W. Germany Adam & Charles Black, p. 70 1914
- Dendorfer, Jürgen. "Regensburg im »Investiturstreit«". Albert-Ludwigs-Universität Freiburg 2009
- Dendorfer, Jürgen; Struve, Tilman. "Heinrich V. : Könige und Große am Ende der Salierzeit" Böhlau Verlag, Köln Weimar Wien 2008
- Dendorfer, Jürgen; Deutinger, Roman. "Das Lehnswesen im Hochmittelalter" (PDF). Jan Thorbecke Verlag
- Dendorfer, Jürgen. "Fidi milites? Die Staufer und Kaiser Heinrich V." ISBN 978-3799542692 2005
- Robinson, I.S. Henry IV of Germany 1056–1106. Cambridge University Press. pp. 290–. ISBN 978-0-521-54590-7. 2003
- Bryce, James. The Holy Roman Empire. MacMillan, 1913
- Hartmann, Wilfried. Der Investiturstreit. Oldenbourg Verlag. pp. 3–. ISBN 978-3-486-70142-5. 2010
- Schlick, Jutta. "König, Fürsten und Reich: (1056–1159); Herrschaftsverständnis im Wandel". University of Heidelberg
- Struve, Tilman. "Die Salier, das Reich und der Niederrhein" (PDF). Böhlau Verlag, Köln Weimar Wien 2008
- Schutz, Herbert. "The Medieval Empire in Central Europe". Cambridge Scholars Publishing, ISBN 1443819662 2010
- Halm, Martina. Studien zum Hof Heinrichs V. University of Bonn 2015
- Vickers, Robert. History of Bohemia C.H. Sergel Company, 1894
- Herbers, Klaus; Johrendt, Jochen. Das Papsttum und das vielgestaltige Italien Walter de Gruyter. ISBN 978-3-11-021468-0 2009
- Borgolte, Michael. Das europäische Mittelalter im Spannungsbogen des Vergleichs. de Gruyter. ISBN 978-3-05-004829-1. 2009
- Robinson, I. S. The Papacy, 1073–1198: Continuity and Innovation. Cambridge University Press. ISBN 978-0-521-31922-5. 1990
- Robinson, J.H. Readings in European History: From the breaking up of the Roman empire to the Protestant revolt. Ginn & co (1904)
- Comyn, Robert. History of the Western Empire, from its Restoration by Charlemagne to the Accession of Charles V, Vol. I. 1851
- Gwatkin, H.M., J. P. Whitney The Cambridge Medieval History: Vol III. Cambridge University Press, 1926.
- Norwich, John Julius. The Normans in the South 1016–1130. Longmans: London, 1967.
- Milman, Henry. History of Latin Christianity, including that of the Popes, Vol. III. 1854

Henry V, Holy Roman Emperor Salian dynasty Born: 1086 Died: 1125
Regnal titles
Preceded by Conrad II	King of Italy; 1098–1125	Succeeded by Conrad III
Preceded by Conrad II	German King (formally King of the Romans); 1099–1125	Succeeded by Emperor Lothair III
Preceded by Emperor Henry IV	King of Burgundy; 1105–1125	Succeeded by Emperor Lothair III
Preceded by Emperor Henry IV	Holy Roman Emperor; 1111–1125	Succeeded by Emperor Lothair III
