= Anselm IV (archbishop of Milan) =

Roman Catholic archbishop (d. 1101)

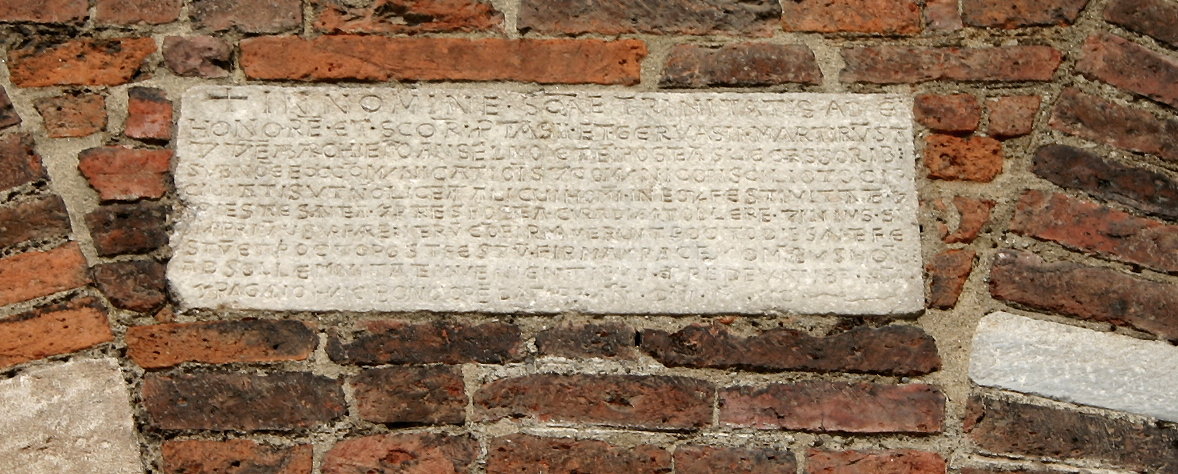
Medieval plaque (year 1098) above the entrance to the Atrium of Sant'Ambrogio basilica in Milan, citing Archbishop Anselm.

Anselm IV (also Anselm of Buis, Italian: Anselmo da Bovisio) (d. 30 September 1101) was the Archbishop of Milan from 3 November 1097 until his death. He was a close friend of Pope Urban II, and prominent in the Crusade of 1101, whose Lombard contingent he led and on which he died.

According to Galvano Fiamma, he was born in Bovisio, the son of a valvassor. He entered the monastery of S. Lorenzo and was then elected, in 1097, bishop of Brescia. Milan was threatening to fall into a schism again when he was elected to bring peace. He had never, however, taken holy orders before his consecration on 3 November.

Under were corrected the irregularities of the past decades at a synod held from 5–7 April 1098. He affirmed the excommunication of imperial-appointed bishops and condemned simony. He accepted the acts of Anselm III, but not those of Tedald.

He was recruited by Pope Paschal II, Urban's successor, to lead the crusade being proclaimed in response to the success of the First Crusade. He preached the crusade throughout Lombardy, where there had been little enthusiasm for the first one, but where his influence sparked a wave of zeal: crowds greeted him chanting "Ultreja! Ultreja!". He returned to Milan in 1099.

On 15 July 1100, he celebrated the anniversary of the fall of Jerusalem in Milan.

He then prepared to return to the Holy Land. He appointed one Grossolano, then bishop of Savona, to act as his vicar and, on 13 September, with bishops Guy of Tortona, William of Pavia, and probably Aldo of Piacenza, he left with a company reported at the exaggerated figure of 50,000 men, led by Albert, Count of Biandrate, and his nephew Otto Altaspata. Albert, Count of Parma, the brother of the Antipope Guibert, was there as a representative of the resolution of the church-state conflicts which enveloped Lombardy in the final decades of the eleventh century.

The army proceeded by land through Carinthia, with the permission of Duke Henry V, and then through Bulgaria without incident, relying on Anselm's negotiations with Alexius I Comnenus, Byzantine emperor, to assure them of markets and supplies. At Constantinople, rioting broke out, but he and Albert quelled it with ease and he refused the rich gifts offered by the emperor, who ferried the soldiery across the Bosphorus. At Nicomedia, in Asia Minor, he met Raymond IV of Toulouse, one of the leading barons of the capture of Jerusalem. Guided by Raymond, the army marched through Anatolia, skirmishing with the Turks at Kastamonu and between Merzifon and Amasya. These initial confrontations were successes for the Lombards. Anselm fought in these engagements and received wounds which he went to Constantinople to nurse.

He died in Constantinople in 1101. He was buried there and news of his death did not reach Milan until 1102. He was succeeded by Grossolano.

== Sources ==
- Landolfo Iuniore di San Paolo. Historia Mediolanensis.
- Ghisalberti, Alberto M. Dizionario Biografico degli Italiani: III Ammirato – Arcoleo. Rome, 1961.
