= Grosolanus =

Grosolanus or Grossolanus, born Peter, was the Archbishop of Milan from 1102 to 1112. He succeeded Anselm IV, who had made him vicar during his absence on the Crusade of 1101, and was succeeded by Jordan, who had been his subdeacon.

Grosolanus was the abbot of Ferrania and already Bishop of Savona when Anselm appointed him to act as his vicar during the crusade.

Grosolanus was accused of simony in obtaining the Ambrosian see by the priest Liprand, who proceeded through the ordeal of fire to prove his charges. This tale is probably an invention of Landolfo Iuniore, bearing little resemblance to reality, save the fact that Grosolanus was opposed by a strong faction in the city. Even in modern times, though, it has served as the inspiration of a song by Enzo Jannacci.

The archbishop was still embattled when, in 1111, he decided to go on a pilgrimage to Outremer. Almost immediately a council of equal numbers of supporters and opponents of the archbishop convened in his absence and, deposing him, elected Jordan of Clivio in his place on New Year's Day. Of all Milan's suffragans, only Atto, Bishop of Acqui, and Arderic, Bishop of Lodi, refused to do homage to the new bishop and remained loyal to Grosolanus. On 6 December, Mainard, Bishop of Turin, formally deposed Grosolanus at the altar in S. Ambrogio.

In August 1113, Grosolanus returned from his pilgrimage. Tensions were raised in the city of Milan, where the old archbishop still had some supporters. Finally, on 11 March 1116, Pope Paschal II declared Grosolanus' transferral from the see of Savona to that of Milan to be invalid and thus null. He was transferred back to Savona and Jordan was papally confirmed as the legitimate Ambrosian pontiff for a second time.

== Sources ==
- Setton, K. M. (1956). "The Byzantine Background to the Italian Renaissance". Proceedings of the American Philosophical Society, 100:1, pp. 1–76.
- Landulphi Junioris sive de Sancto Paulo Historia Mediolanensis ab anno MXCV usque ad annum MCXXXVII. translated (Italian) by Carlo Castiglioni. Zanichelli: Bologna, 1934.
- Alfredo Lucioni, "Grossolano", in Dizionario della Chiesa Ambrosiana. vol. 3, pp. 1531–1532. NED: Milan, 1989.
- Pietro Verri, Storia di Milano, 1798 - Tomo I, pp. 149–154 (cap. VI)
- Caravale, Mario (ed). Dizionario Biografico degli Italiani: LX Grosso – Guglielmo da Forlì. Rome, 2003.
