= Jordan (archbishop of Milan) =

Jordan (Italian: Giordano da Clivio) was the Archbishop of Milan from 1 January 1112 to his death on 4 October 1120. Born in Clivio, he entered the church of Milan young and was ordained a subdeacon while serving under the Archbishop Grossolano.

== Jordan replaces Grossolano ==
He was appointed to Saint-Gilles, in Provence, France, to continue his education, as was typical for Milanese youths of his day. He was recalled in 1111 by Olrico da Corte, the vicedominus, and ordained a presbyter on 1 September by Ariald, Bishop of Genoa. The embattled Archbishop Grossolano travelled to the Holy Land, leaving Guazzone Comino and Amizone da Sala in charge with Arderic, Bishop of Lodi, as his acting vicar. On New Year's Day a council of equal numbers of supporters and opponents of the archbishop convened in his absence and, deposing him, elected Jordan to replace him. In February, Landulf, Bishop of Asti, consecrated the new archbishop to his post and, together with Ariald and Mainard, Bishop of Turin|Mainard of Turin, did homage to Jordan as his suffragans. Atto, Bishop of Acqui, and Arderic of Lodi refused to do homage to the new bishop and remained loyal to Grossolano. On 6 December, Mainard formally deposed Grossolano at the altar in S. Ambrogio. Jordan and Bernard, Bishop of Pavia, proclaimed a general peace throughout Lombardy, of which Jordan was now the primate. He received the recognition of Pope Paschal II, legitimising the irregularities of his election.

== Grossolano returns ==
In August 1113, Grossolano returned from his pilgrimage. Tensions were raised in the city of Milan, where the old archbishop still had some supporters. Finally, on 11 March 1116, Paschal declared Grossolano's transferral from the see of Savona to that of Milan to be invalid and thus null. He was transferred back to Savona and Jordan was again confirmed as the legitimate Ambrosian pontiff.

== Milan ==
Jordan was a staunch papist (later Guelph) and under him Milan was a centre of anti-imperial feeling. His episcopate saw the citizens of Milan grow in power. In 1116, they began electing consuls, with all secular powers that had been theretofore reserved for the bishops. In a solemn ceremony at S. Tecla, Jordan even excommunicated the reigning emperor, Henry V.

Jordan interfered extensively in his suffragan diocese. He deposed Armanno da Gavardo from Brescia and made the elected Villanus, Bishop of Brescia|Villanus bishop there. He deposed Ugo da Noceto in Cremona and raised Oberto da Dovara in his place. He intervened in the episcopal succession to Como in 1118 and sparked a nine-year war between the cities of Milan and Como. In Spring 1120, he met the returning Pope Callistus II at Tortona (the pope had been visiting France). Jordan died in the fall of 1120 and was buried in his basilica. He was succeeded by Olrico, who had first recalled him from Provence.

== Sources ==
- Landulf Iuniore di San Paolorem. Historia Mediolanensis.
- Caravale, Mario (ed). Dizionario Biografico degli Italiani: LV Ginammi – Giovanni da Crema. Rome, 2000.
