= Lazar =

Lazar may refer to:

- Lazar (name), any of various persons with this name
- Lazar BVT, Serbian armoured personnel carriers
- Lazar 2, Serbian multi-role armoured personnel carrier
- Lazar 3, Serbian multi-role armoured personnel carrier
- Lazăr, a tributary of the river Jiul de Vest in Hunedoara County, Romania
- Lázár, a 2025 novel by Nelio Biedermann

== See also ==
- Lazar house, former term for leper colony
- Knights of St Lazarus
- Lazarus (disambiguation)
- Lăzărești (disambiguation)
- Lazard (disambiguation)
- Laser (disambiguation)
- Lazer (disambiguation)
- Lazare (disambiguation)
- LazarBeam (born 1994), Australian YouTuber
- Lazar the Serb
