= Lazard (disambiguation) =

Lazard is an investment bank.

Lazard may also refer to:

- Lazard (surname)
- Lazard, a character in the video game Crisis Core: Final Fantasy VII
- Lazard station, a former railway station in Montreal, replaced by Bois-Franc station in 1995

== See also ==
- Lazar (disambiguation)
- Lazare (disambiguation)
