= Laser mask =

Laser mask may refer to:

- Photomask, a lasering pattern mask used in laser etching and lithography
- Laser surgical mask, a mask worn by people during laser surgery

== See also ==
- Laser (disambiguation)
- Mask (disambiguation)
