= Lazer =

Lazer may refer to:

- Lazer, Hautes-Alpes, a commune in southeastern France
- Panther Lazer, a car
- Lazer 103, former branding of American radio station WLZR-FM
- Lazer 99.3, the branding of American radio station WLZX-FM

== People with the name ==
- David Lazer, American computer scientist
- Joan Lazer, American actress (1936 or 1937 – 2015)

== See also ==
- Laser, a device that emits light through a process of optical amplification
- Lazer Team, a 2015 feature film by Rooster Teeth Productions
- Major Lazer, an electronic dance music trio
- Laser (disambiguation)
- Lazar (disambiguation)
- Laze (disambiguation)
