= Lazare (disambiguation) =

Lazare is a given name and a surname.

Lazare may also refer to:

- Lazare (Bruneau), a 1903 opera by Alfred Bruneau
- a late work (1974) by André Malraux (1901–1976), which dealt with one of his last illnesses
- a song by the Polish folk-metal band Percival

== See also ==
- Saint-Lazare (disambiguation)
- Lazar (disambiguation)
