= Gislebertus =

French sculptor

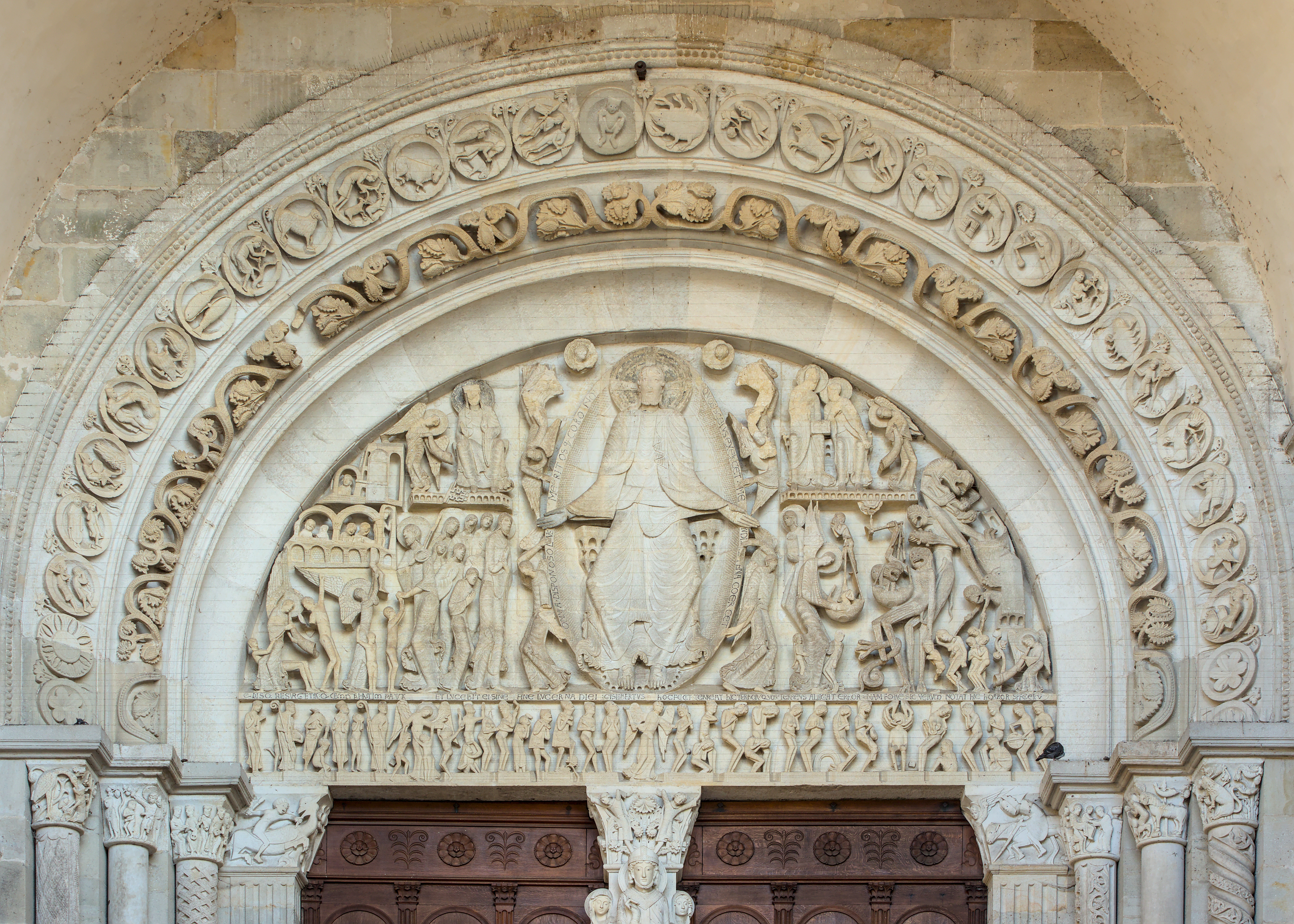
Last Judgment by Gislebertus in the west tympanum at the Autun Cathedral

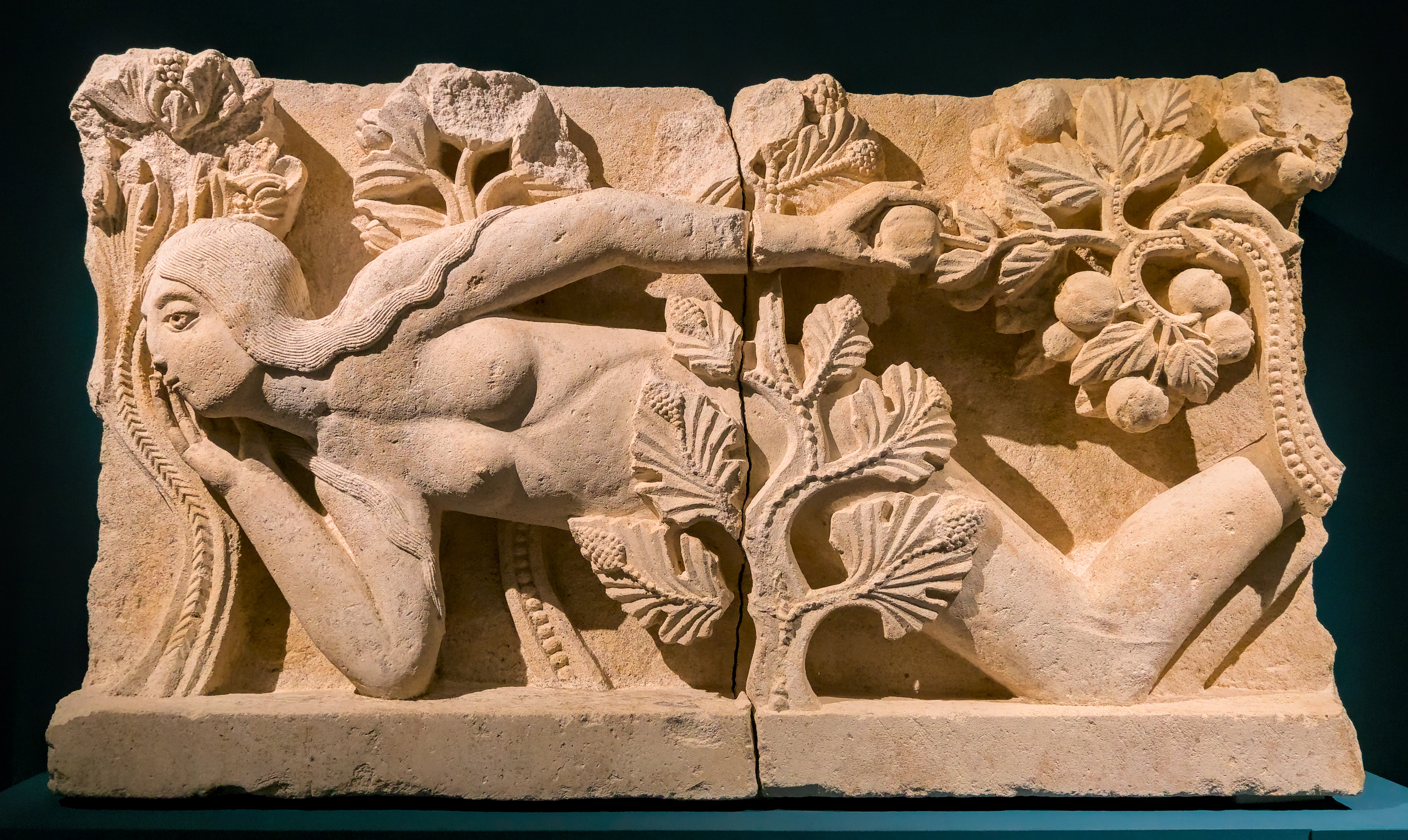
The Temptation of Eve, now at the Musée Rolin

Gislebertus of Autun (also Giselbertus or Ghiselbertus; French: Gislebert fl. 1115–1135), was a French Romanesque sculptor, whose decoration (about 1120–35) of the Cathedral of Saint Lazare at Autun, France – consisting of numerous doorways, tympana and capitals – represents some of the most original work of the period.

The name, presumably belonging to this sculptor, is inscribed on the west tympanum at the Autun Cathedral, which has led to extensive theoretical work attributing other French sculptures of the period to him. According to a modern theory, the name may belong to the person who commissioned the cathedral (possibly Gilbert, Duke of Burgundy).

== Style ==
The name Gislebertus, the Latin for "Gilbert" (and for other "Gilberts" more usually spelt as the variants above), is found carved on the west tympanum of Autun Cathedral: Gislebertus hoc fecit or "Gislebertus made this." Some scholars today believe that this is actually the name of the patron who commissioned the work, rather than that of the artist. The lead sculptor would in any case have had a number of assistants, though the distinctive designs may well have been the work of a single hand. Gislebertus's name is the first ever found on stone work in France from the Romanesque period, as the sculptors before him believed themselves to be working for God, instead of themselves being creative individuals. On the other hand, as Grivot and Zarnecki state:

Signatures of this kind were not unusual in the Romanesque period. What is surprising about this one is its position and importance. Earlier examples in France were placed unobtrusively either at the base of a column or more frequently on a capital.

Fernand Auberjonois writes that shortly after the mid-18th century the Church "did considerable artistic 'house cleaning' ... replacing Romanesque carvings looked on as barbaric with ornaments more suited to the era's new-found Greco-Roman taste." Clergy removed the head of Christ in order to smoothly plaster over the tympanum of the west front. Carvings above the tympanum of 24 Patriarchs and Prophets were completely removed. Auberjonois explains that "The north portal of St. Lazare suffered even more grievous harm. Here Gislebertus had portrayed the resurrection of Lazarus, as well as Satan, Adam, and a magnificent Eve whose gesture at the moment she picks the fatal apple is an unrivaled example of absent-minded detachment.

Alternatively, the gesture can be interpreted as representing lamentation. Kirk Ambrose writes: "Gestures in Fall scenes are typically limited to the offering and receiving of the forbidden fruit. Occasionally, a figure is represented placing a hand to his or her cheek, a traditional gesture of lamentation that appears in earlier Genesis cycles at various moments in the narrative, such as the Shame or Expulsion.… This lamentation gesture is found on an earlier Vezelay capital of the Fall, which most likely dates to Abbot Artaud's building campaign in the first years of the twelfth century and which was reemployed in the nave. Other sculpted Romanesque examples of this pose in Burgundy include the Eve lintel fragment from Autun and a scene of the Shame on the south tympanum of Anzy-le-Duc."

Of the main figures that adorned this entrance, only Eve has survived. She disappeared for years, having been carted down to the foot of the hill where the large stone on which she is carved served as building material for a house constructed in 1769. There she remained hidden for a century until that dwelling in turn was torn down." Eve is considered one of the greatest art works in the Western tradition. It is the first large scale nude sculpture produced since Roman times. T. S. R. Boase, President of Magdalen College, Oxford, said "Eve has a seductive quality that no other 12th-century artist has equalled. If the other block (Adam) had survived, we would most certainly have had in it the completion of a great masterpiece".

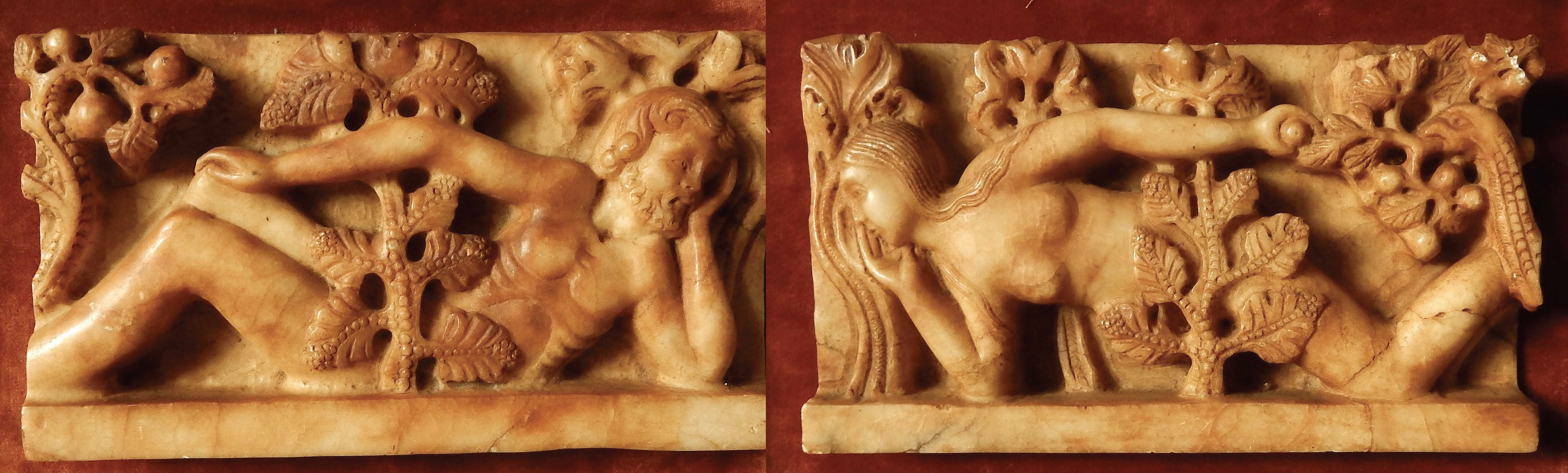
The Giselbertus Adam & Eve Alabasters in the collection of the Yuko Nii Foundation, 12th-18th centuries

The Yuko Nii Foundation alabasters of Adam and Eve recently came to light; these 12th-century versions of the Autun Cathedral Adam and Eve lintels may be the only surviving replica of this Giselbertus Adam masterpiece, which makes it significant. No other drawings or other copies of the Giselbertus Adam have been seen in our time in any library or museum.

In 1837, archaeologists freed the Last Judgment from the mortar and in 1858, the architectural restorer Viollet-le-Duc restored the tympanum by replacing lost or damaged sculptures with copies, leaving the head of Christ unrestored. In 1948 St. Lazare's choir-master, Abbe Denis Grivot, proved what he and others had suspected. A head of Christ in a nearby museum was the sculpture that had been removed 200 years previously. Grivot found that the sculpture fit perfectly into the tympanum. Other sculptures remain missing.

In their book "Gislebertus, sculpteur d'Autun" (1960) Denis Grivot and George Zarnecki wrote that presumably Gislebertus first worked at Cluny, most likely as a chief assistant to the Master of Cluny in 1115. His work reflects many of the biblical scenes as depicted in the bible, capturing their raw emotions. Gislebertus was taught about Jesus's compassion, and how he was loving and caring, this reflects in some of his art works around the cathedral. Originally the cathedral was created as a hospital for lepers, which were seen as diseased and almost forsaken in a sense. The reliefs at the front of the cathedral reflect imagery which would be appealing to the lepers, giving them hope. He contributed to the decorations the Abbey of Cluny.

After concluding his training at Cluny he set off to Vézelay, where he created the tympanum above the portico. His sculpture is expressive and imaginative: from the terrifying Last Judgment which depicts Jesus's return to Earth, judging all souls (dead and alive) on whether or not they spend eternity in heaven or hell. (West Tympanum), with its strikingly elongated figures, to the Eve (North Portal), the first large-scale nude in European art since antiquity and a model of sinuous grace. His influence can be traced to other French church sculpture, and his techniques helped pave the way for the Gothic style.
