= Autun Cathedral =

- Cathedral of Saint Lazarus
- Cathédrale Saint-Lazare d'Autun
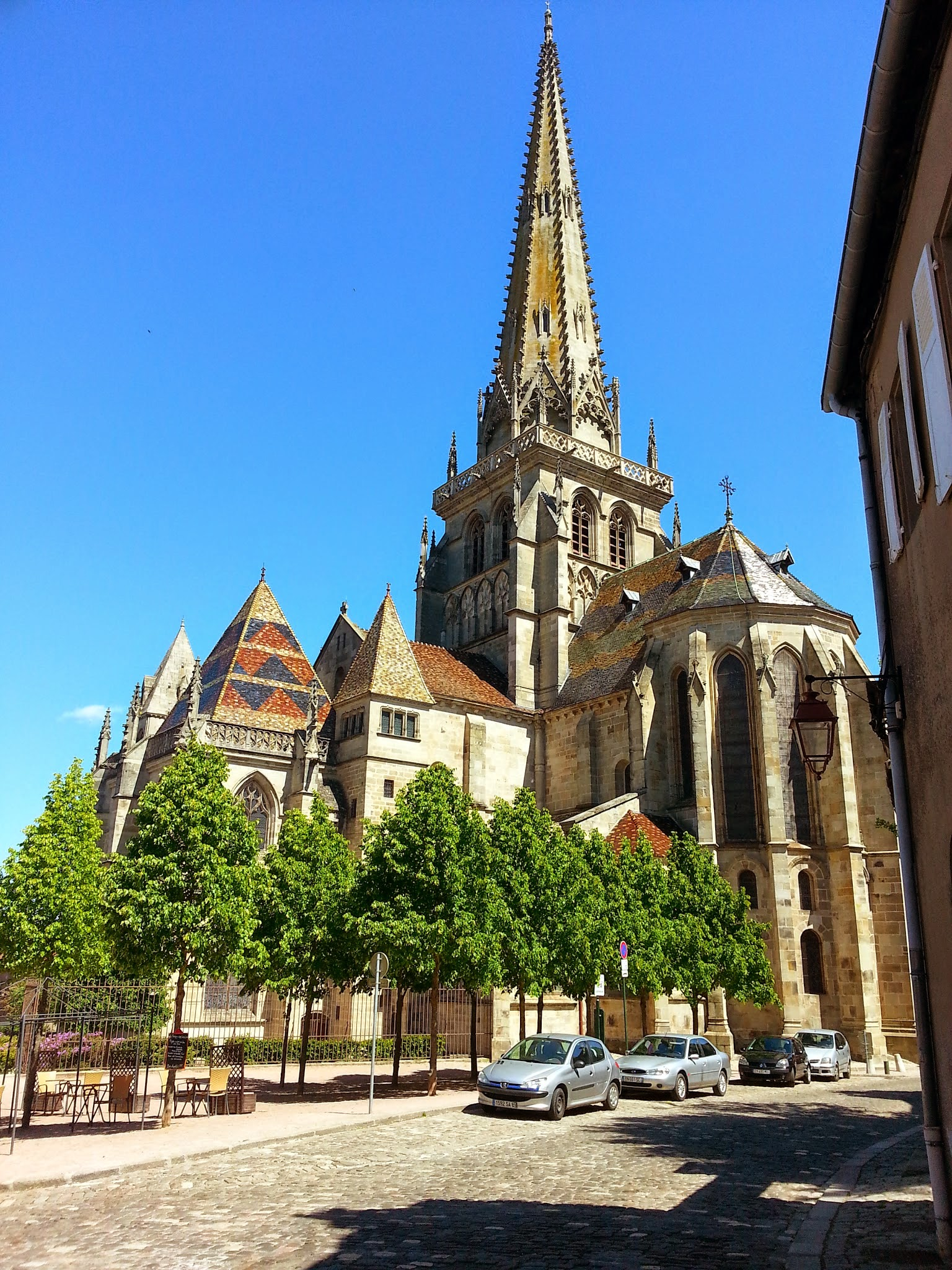
- Autun Cathedral
- 46°56′42″N 4°17′57″E
- Location: Autun, Burgundy, France
- Denomination: Catholic
- Website: https://cathedrale.autun-art-et-histoire.fr

History
- Status: Cathedral
- Dedication: Lazarus of Aix
- Consecrated: 1132

Architecture
- Functional status: Active
- Heritage designation: Monument historique
- Designated: 1840
- Style: Romanesque, Gothic
- Groundbreaking: 1120
- Completed: 1146; Significant modifications in the 13th and 16th centuries

Administration
- Diocese: Autun

Monument historique
- Official name: Cathédrale Saint-Lazare
- Reference no.: PA00113073

The Cathedral of Saint Lazarus of Autun (French: Cathédrale Saint-Lazare d'Autun), commonly known as Autun Cathedral, is a Roman Catholic cathedral in Autun and a national monument of France. Famous for its Cluniac inspiration and its Romanesque sculptures by Gislebertus, it is a highlight of Romanesque art in Burgundy. It is the seat of the Roman Catholic Diocese of Autun and its Bishop. The Bishop of Autun set forth the construction of St. Lazarus Cathedral as a result of the large movement of pilgrims travelling to Vezelay as they progressed on the pilgrimage route to Santiago de Compostela.

Due to social practices that involved pilgrims venerating the relics of saints in this period, the Bishop of Autun ordered the creation of a larger cathedral to house the relics and accommodate the influx of pilgrims into Autun. The column capitals and main façade of the church are embellished with realistic sculptures carved by Gislebertus. The artwork is a means of teaching the masses of Christian ethics with dramatic scenes of heaven and hell. Other features include a rare tympanum signed by Giselbertus of Autun.

== History ==
=== Saint Nazaire Cathedral ===
The first cathedral of Autun was built from the 5th century onwards (later dedicated to Saint Nazarius (St. Nazaire), as it held relics of Saints Nazarius and Celsus) and was several times refurbished and enlarged. In about 970 it obtained from Marseille some of the relics of Lazarus of Aix, in the belief that they were relics of Lazarus of Bethany, the friend of Jesus. These became an object of pilgrimage and the crowds became too great for the cathedral building. The Bishop of Autun, Etienne de Bâgé, therefore decided in about 1120 on the construction of a new cathedral as a pilgrimage church and for the better veneration of the relics. The new cathedral was allotted a site to the north of the earlier cathedral of Saint Nazaire, of which some remains may still be seen.

=== Saint Lazare Cathedral ===
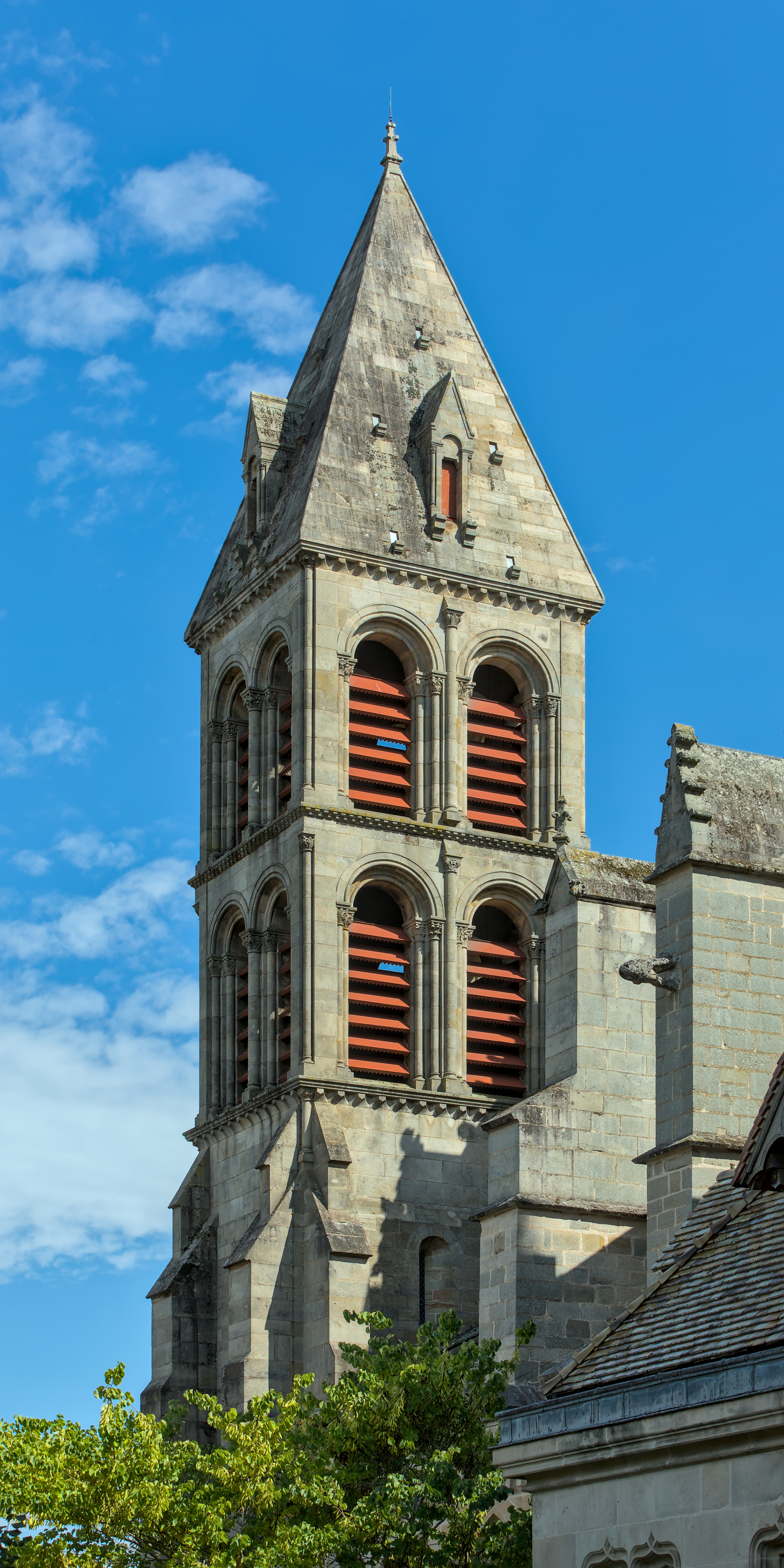
West tower

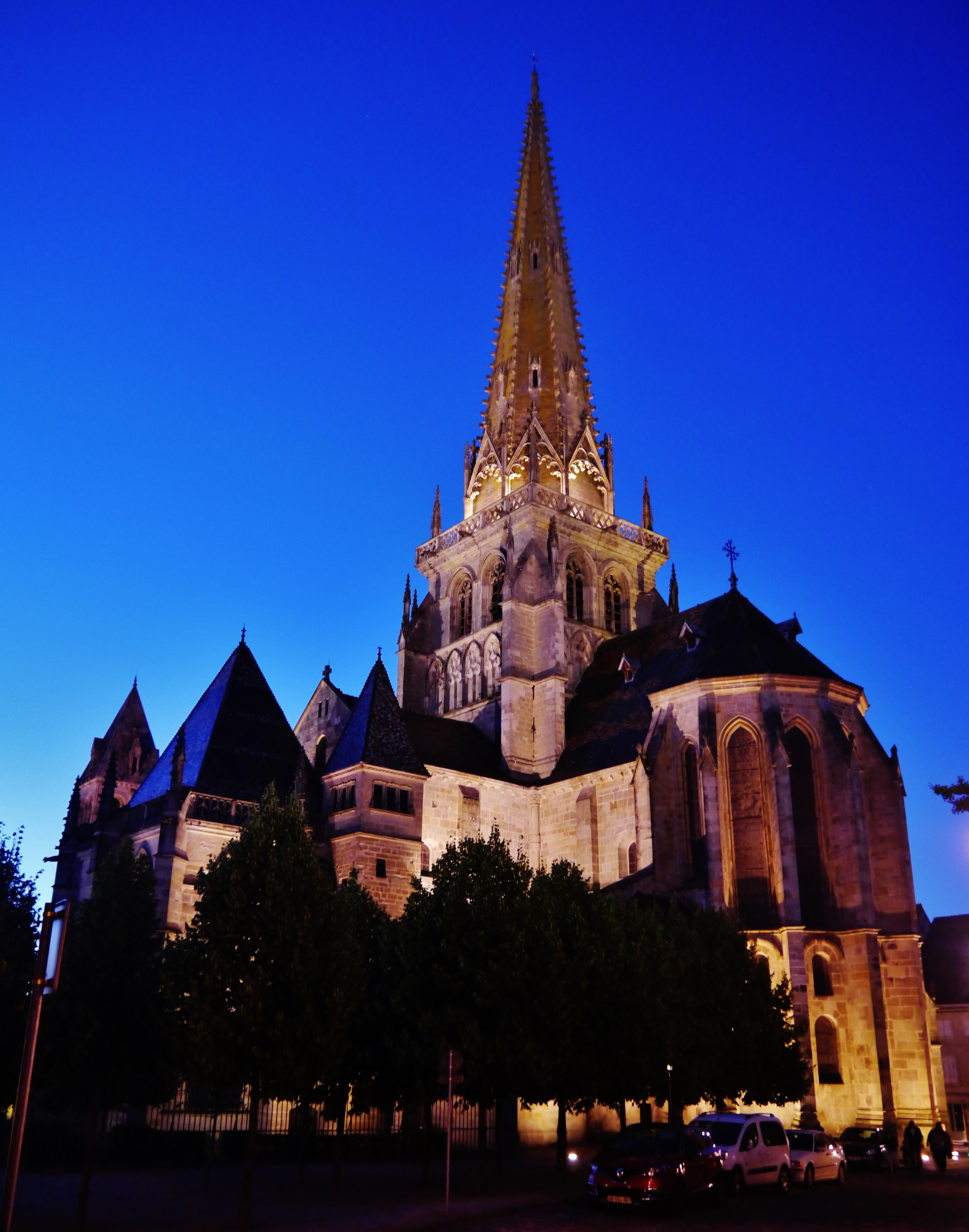
The Autun Cathedral at night

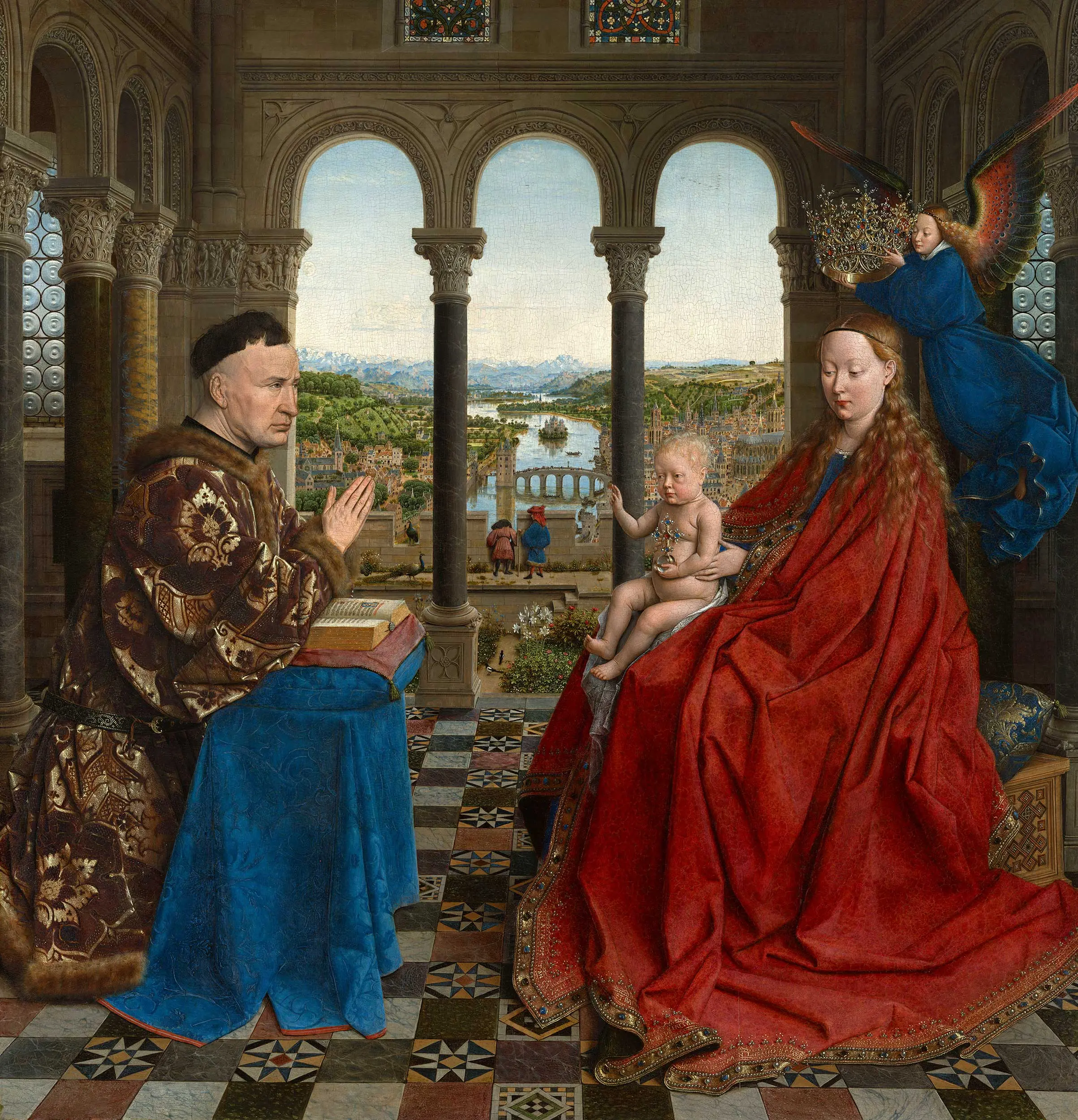
Madonna of Chancellor Rolin, Oil on panel, c. 1435. 66cm x 62cm. Musée du Louvre, Paris

Work on the new cathedral of Saint Lazarus (St. Lazare) began in around 1120 and advanced rapidly enough for the building to be consecrated in 1132. It was mostly finished by 1146, when the relics of Lazarus were translated from the old cathedral. The Tomb of Lazarus, the shrine of the relics, was constructed in the choir in 1170–1180. The narthex or portico was not completed until the very end of the century.

St. Lazare Cathedral stands in the highest and best fortified corner of the town, and through external modifications that have been applied to the building the appearance has been much altered by the addition of a Gothic tower, a spire and side chapels in the 15th century. The cathedral still contains a highly Romanesque appearance on the interior. In the period 1462-1469, Bishop Jean Rolin had a new belfry built in replacement of the Romanesque one that was unfortunately destroyed by a bolt of lightning.

The inspiration of the new building, both in layout and decoration, was Cluniac. The designs were the work of the bishop Etienne de Bâgé, who was particularly influenced by the Cluniac abbey of Paray-le-Monial. St. Lazare Cathedral was consecrated in 1132.

For a number of years after 1146 the two cathedrals operated in tandem, with Saint Lazare as the summer cathedral (from Easter to All Saints' Day) and Saint Nazaire as the winter cathedral. The cathedral was finished in 1146, (with the exception of the porch which was added a few years later); Abbé Grivot writing in his excellent guide to the cathedral explains that the interior of the building is not Gothic, as there are no crossed diagonal ribs, but Romanesque vaulting as was used at Cluny III. Saint Lazare was eventually confirmed as the one cathedral of Autun in 1195. From 1793 until 1805 it was home to the famous painting Madonna of Chancellor Rolin by Jan van Eyck, now in the Musée du Louvre.

== Architecture ==
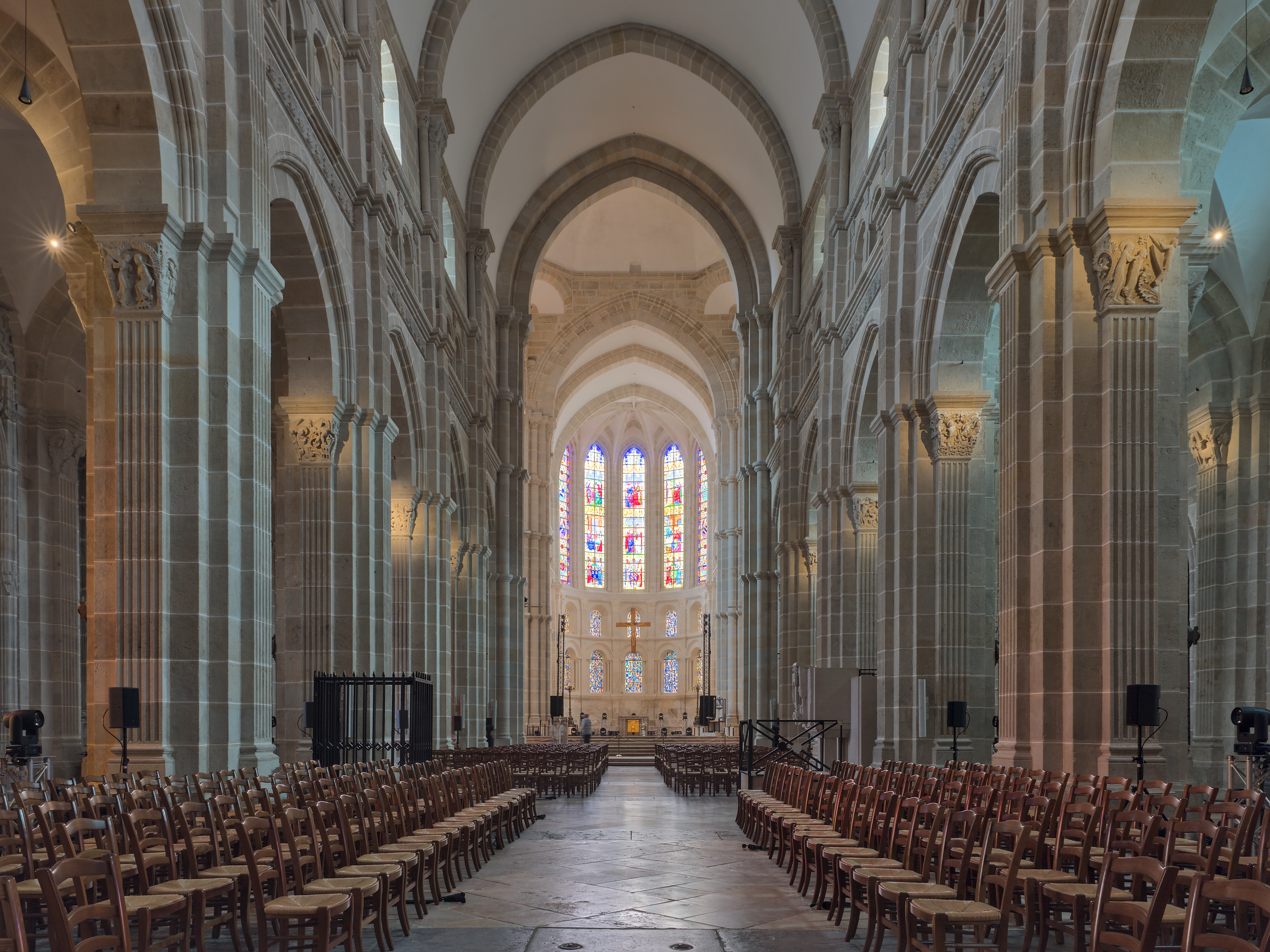
Nave of Autun Cathedral

=== Interior ===
The interior has a nave and two aisles, divided by massive columns with longitudinal carvings punctuated with beautifully decorated Romanesque capitals. The plan of the cathedral has a narthex of two bays topped by two towers, followed by a 7-bay nave flanked by side aisles and a transept with the tower surmounting cross. The twin flanking towers date from the 19th century.

The nave elevation is composed of three levels: grand arcade, triforium and clerestory, each marked by a cornice. The three-story elevation of St. Lazare was made possible by the use of pointed arches for the nave. Each nave bay is separated at the vault by a transverse rib. Each transept projects to the width of two nave bays and the west entrance has a narthex which screens the main portal. The triforium base is decorated with a frieze of rosettes and consists of three blind arches.

The pointed arch has been debated to be adapted from Islamic Art architecture where it had been used for some time. Many of the historiated capitals that adorn the columns within St Lazare were carved by Gislebertus that include fine representations of the Flight into Egypt and Adoration of the Magi. The capitals adorn columns along the nave. What makes St. Lazare a masterpiece of Romanesque art is the quality of Gislebertus' sculpture that appears on dozens of capitals in the nave and chancel including scenes from the Bible carved in stone in a very particular style.

=== Exterior ===
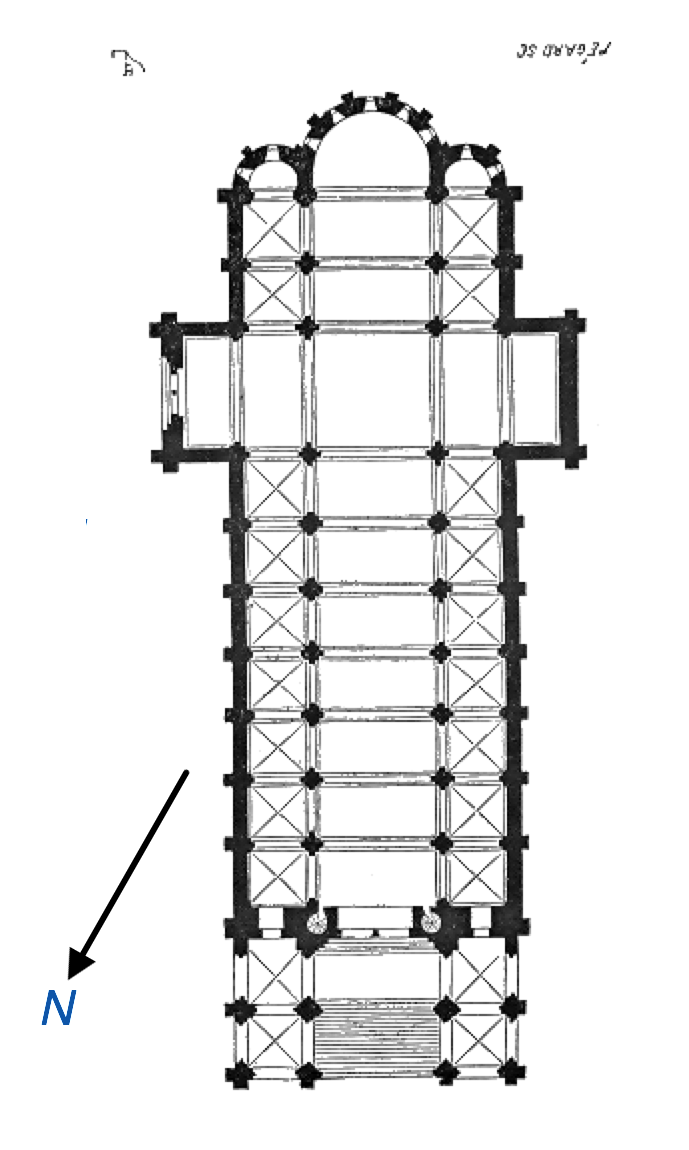
The Autun Cathedral plan

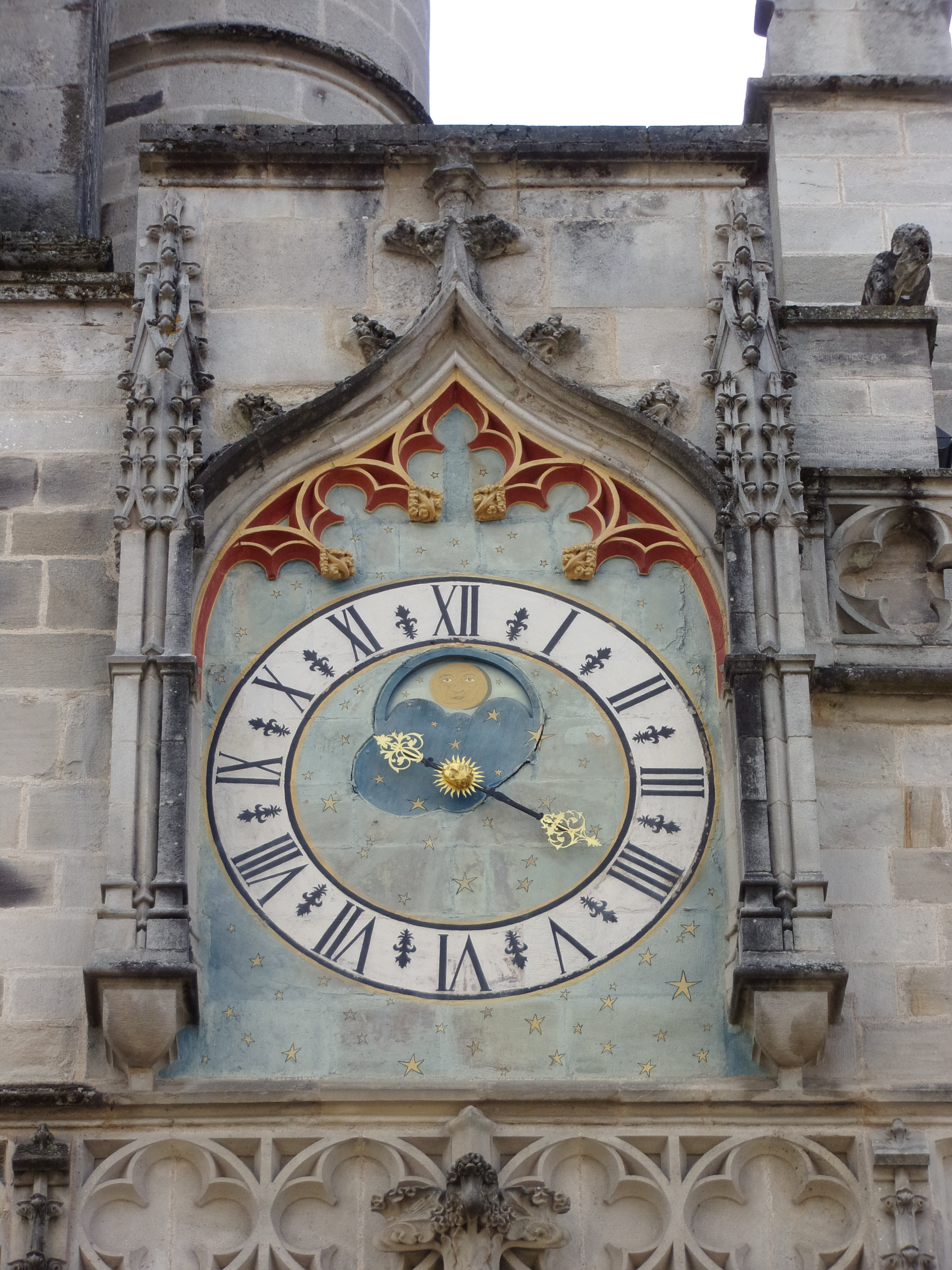
Astronomical clock located on the east façade of Saint-Lazare Cathedral.

The Cathedral of St. Lazare has a ground-plan in the form of a Latin cross, with an aisled nave, a plain transept and a three-stage choir with a semicircular end. The Gothic spire dates from the 15th century although the west towers were rebuilt in the 19th century, based on the Romanesque style of Paray-le-Monial.

== Capitals ==
St. Lazare Cathedral contains some of the most spectacular Romanesque capitals done by Gislebertus in its nave and choir. Gislebertus created capitals that used the tendrils of the actual Corinthian capital to create an architectural frame for the narrative of the story to develop. The capitals of the portal are carved with biblical and traditional scenes. One depicts St. Jerome removing a thorn from a lion's paw; another shows the Presentation of Christ. Over 60 capitals within St. Lazare are known to be the works of Gislebertus and include other biblical narratives including Samson, the prophet Habakkuk, Cain & Abel, St. Peter, as well as capitals containing Christ and the Apostles. The intricate carvings that make up the capitals by Gislebertus vividly display the narrative it is meant to be picturing.

Owing to a near-collapse in the 19th century, the capitals under the central tower were replaced by replicas; the originals can be viewed up close in the upstairs chapter house (entrance to the right of the choir). Among the scenes on the capitals in the chapter house are the Flight into Egypt, God Questioning Cain, the Hanging of Judas, and the Adoration of the Magi.

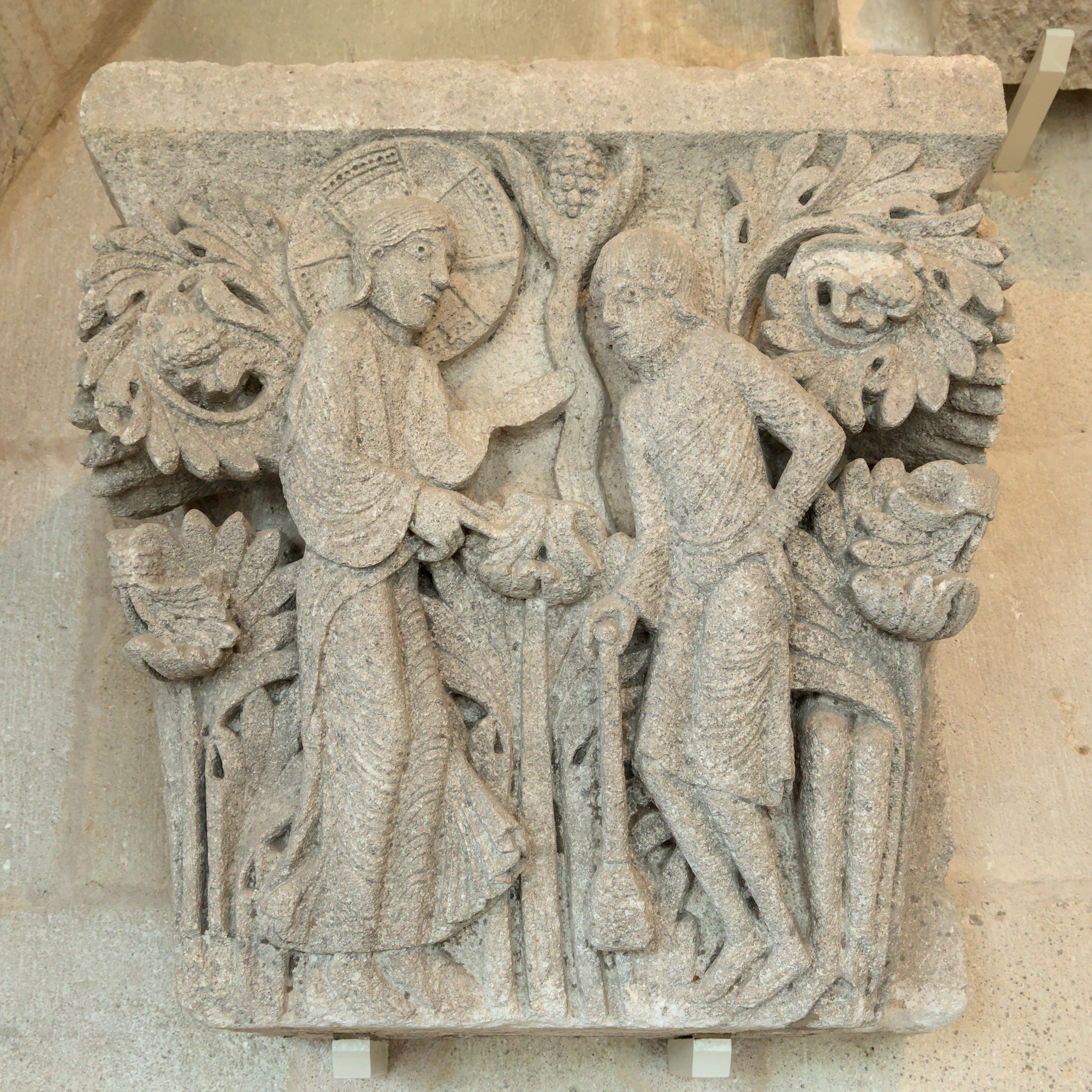
God Questioning Cain Capital

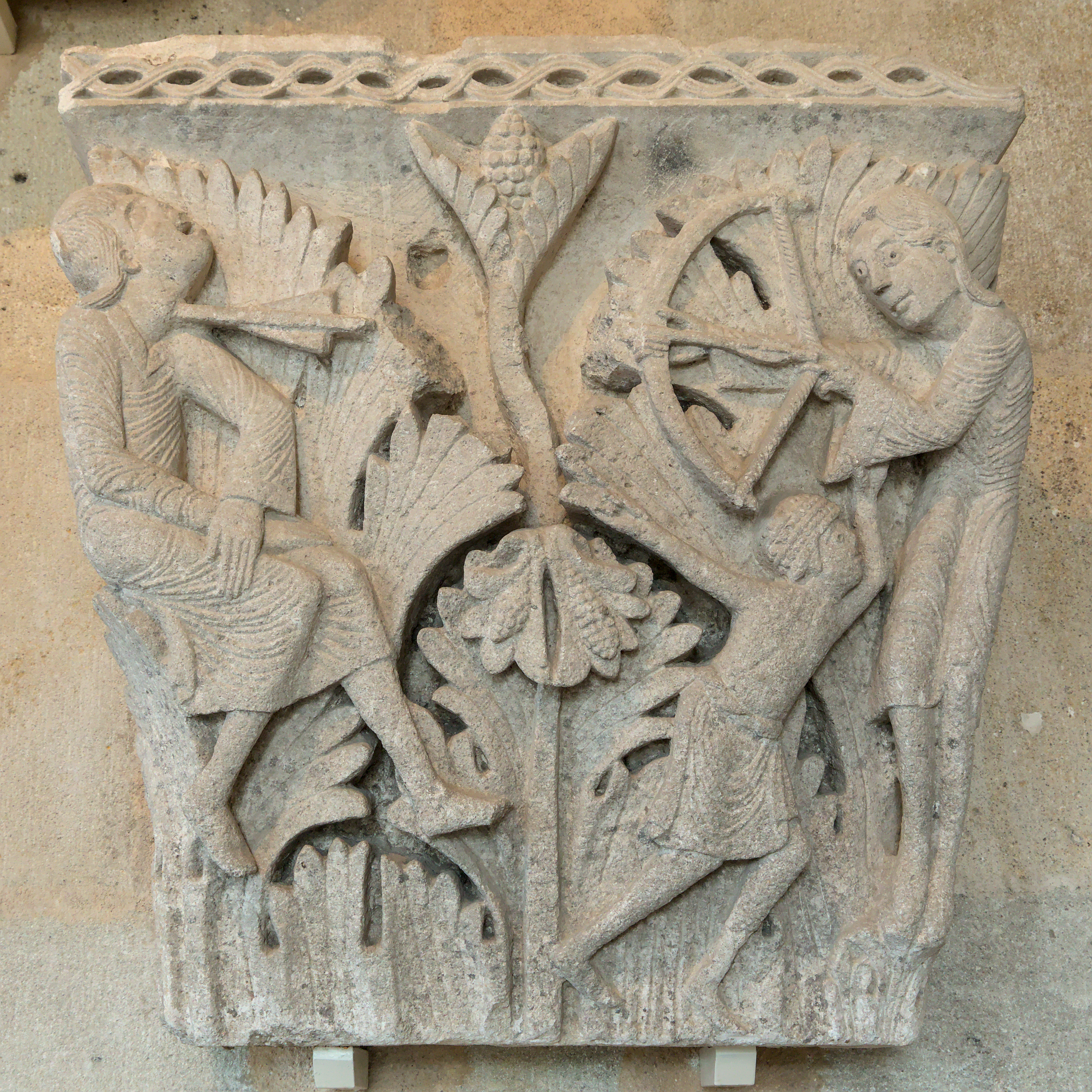
The Death of Cain Capital

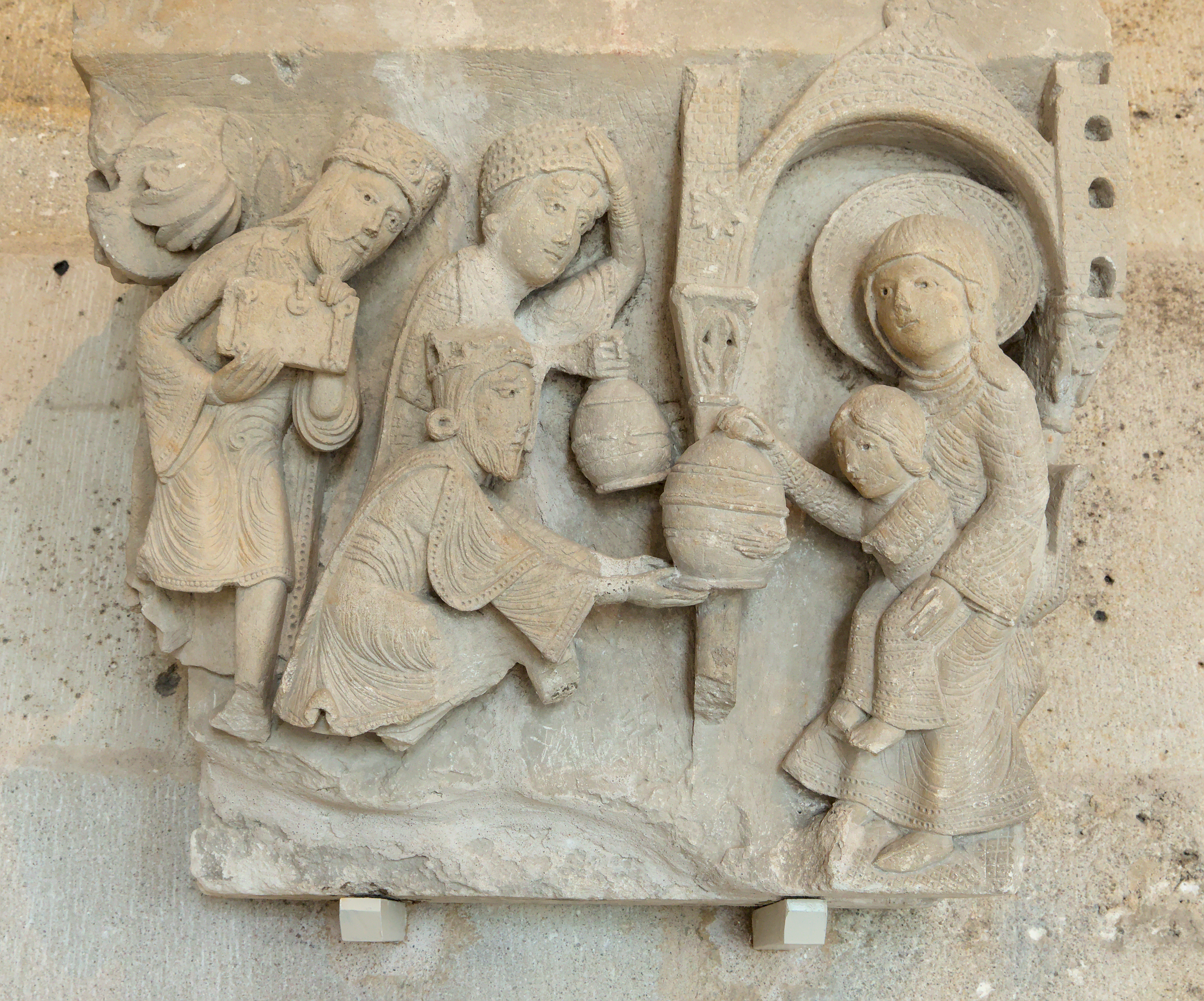
Adoration of the Magi Capital

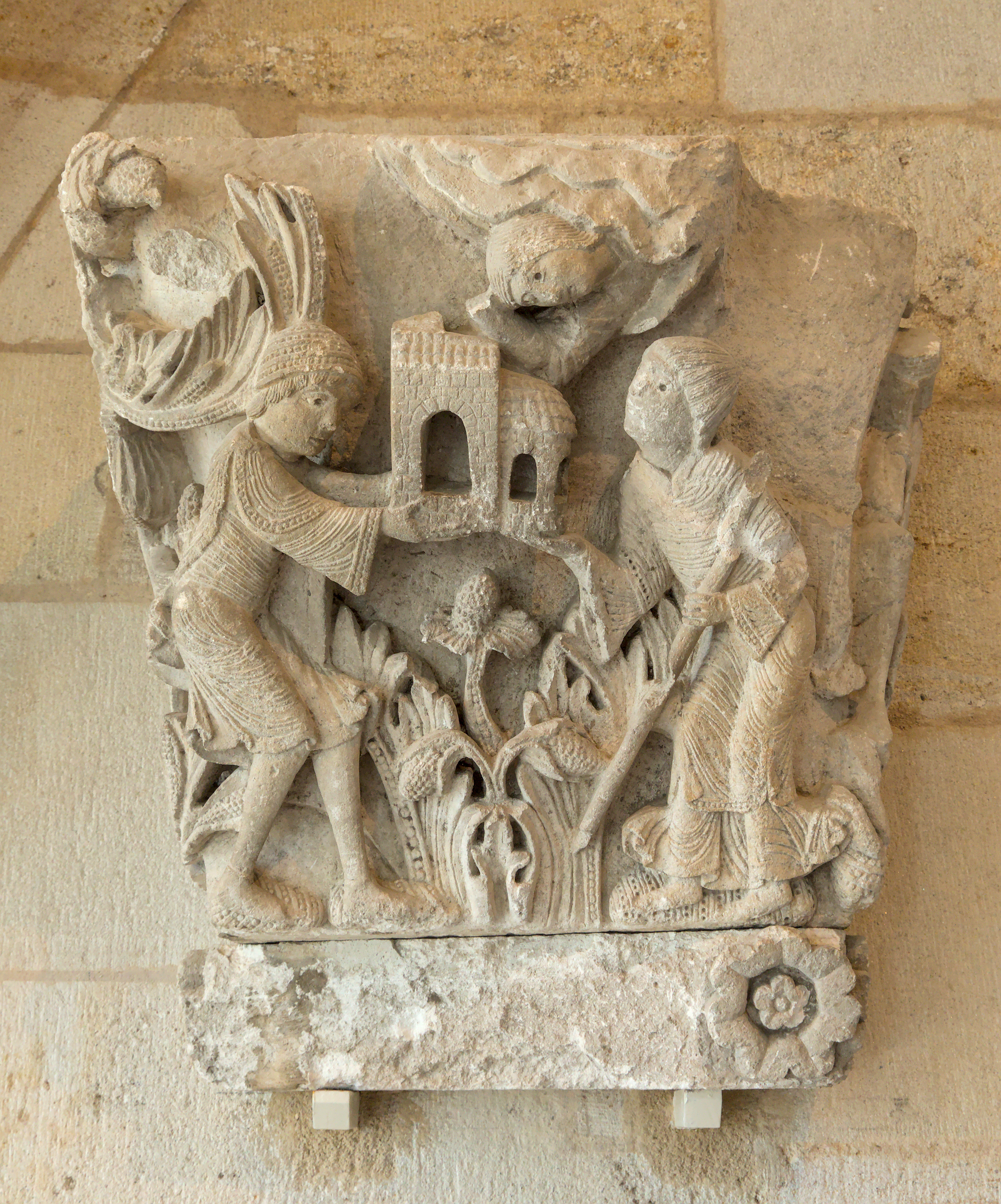
Presentation of the Autun Cathedral Capital

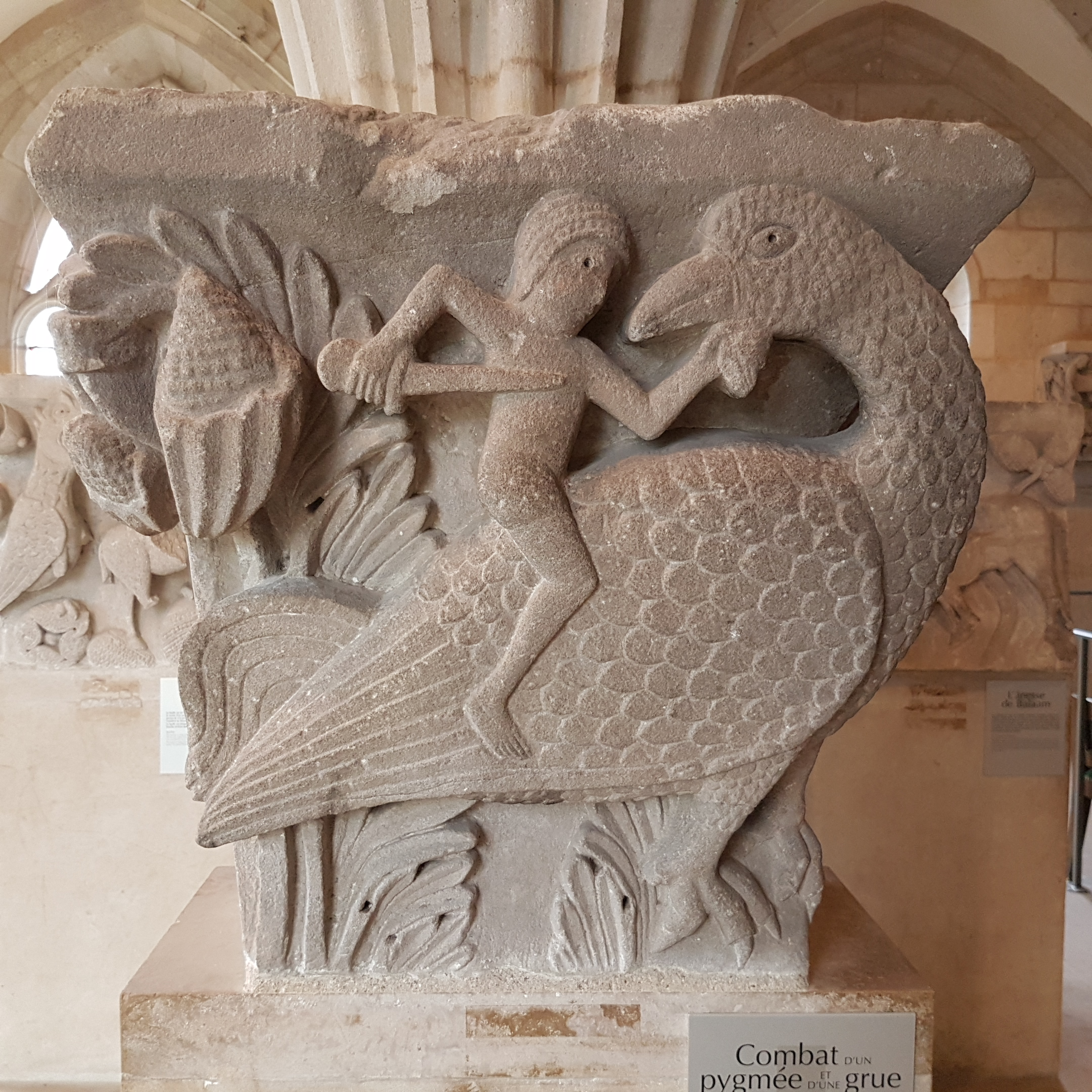
Fight of a pygmy and a crane capital

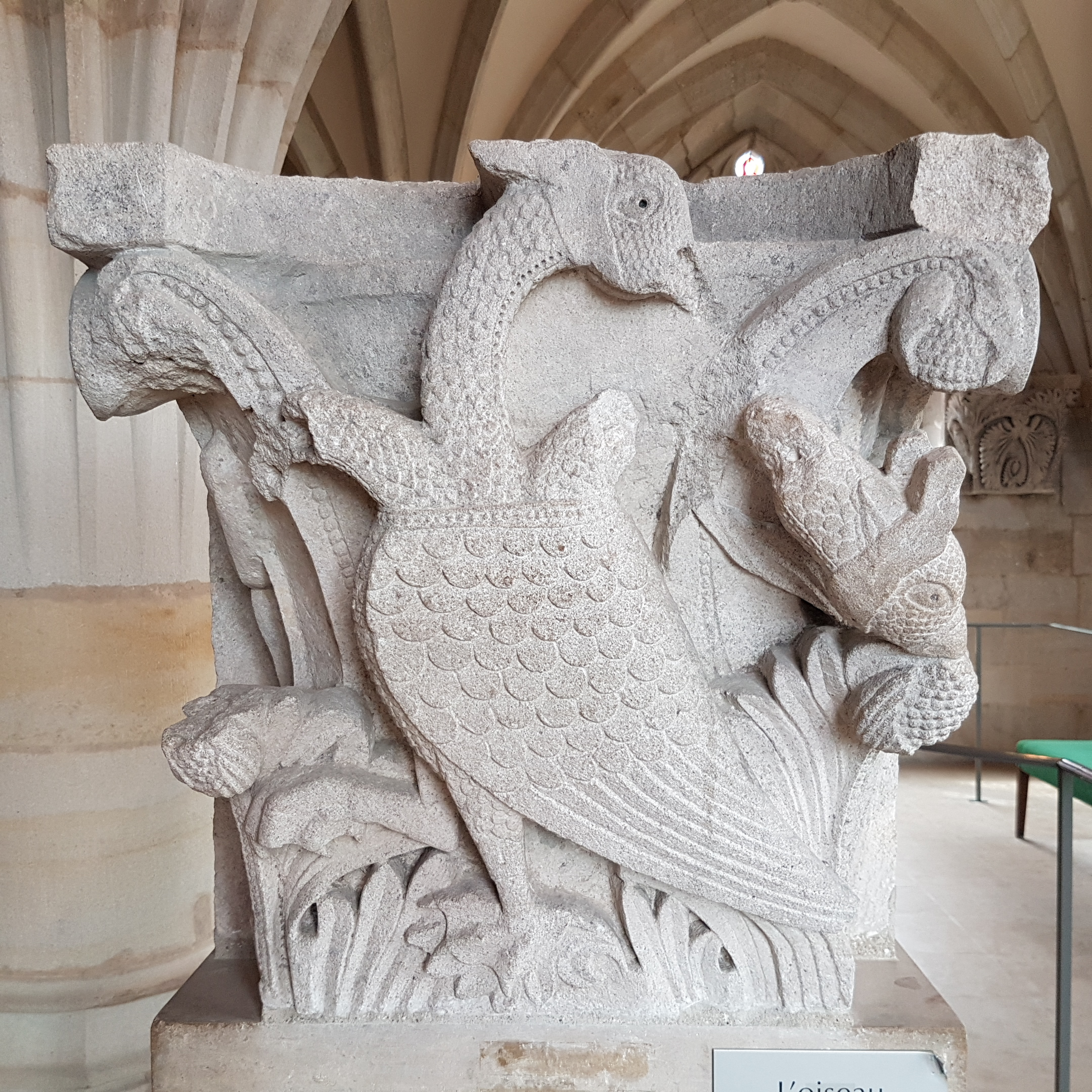
The three headed Bird capital

=== Three Magi Capital ===
Gislebertus is conceiving the capitals through liturgical drama. This capitals depicts the angel's attempt to wake the three sleeping magi. The angel points to the star in attempt to have the three magi to follow the star. The narrative of the three magi extends along the columns in the nave. Each capital shows great detail and a vivid depiction of the story it is telling.

=== The Flight to Egypt Capital ===
The Flight into Egypt capital by Gislebertus is located on the column opposite of the Adoration of the Magi narrative. The Flight into Egypt capital depicts Mary with a calm demeanour showing us her child as she sits upon the pony. She seems to be floating on the donkey rather than sitting on him, a position similar to the enthroned Madonna and Child.

=== Suicide of Judas Capital ===
When Judas realizes what he has done to Jesus he repents. In his horror he hangs himself, unable to bear betraying his master. The capital shows Judas with an open face shown in a grimace with his tongue out. The capital also depicts demons pulling Judas up and hanging him. Gislebertus actually uses one of the tendrils of the Corinthian capital in an innovative way to demonstrate what was used to hang Judas. The fire hair of the devils represents a reference to hell. Gislebertus displays a strong didactic image within the Suicide of Judas capital.

=== Vices and Virtues Capital ===
This capital depicts Charity defeating Greed and Patience conquering Wrath. Such a carving would remind parishioners that evil intentions must be overcome if purity of heart and life is to prevail. This Romanesque capital would provide a didactic function for pilgrims that were illiterate and unable to read the script. The vice and virtues capital contains acanthus leaves on the background with Charity and Patience stepping upon the "vices" which are demonic creatures.

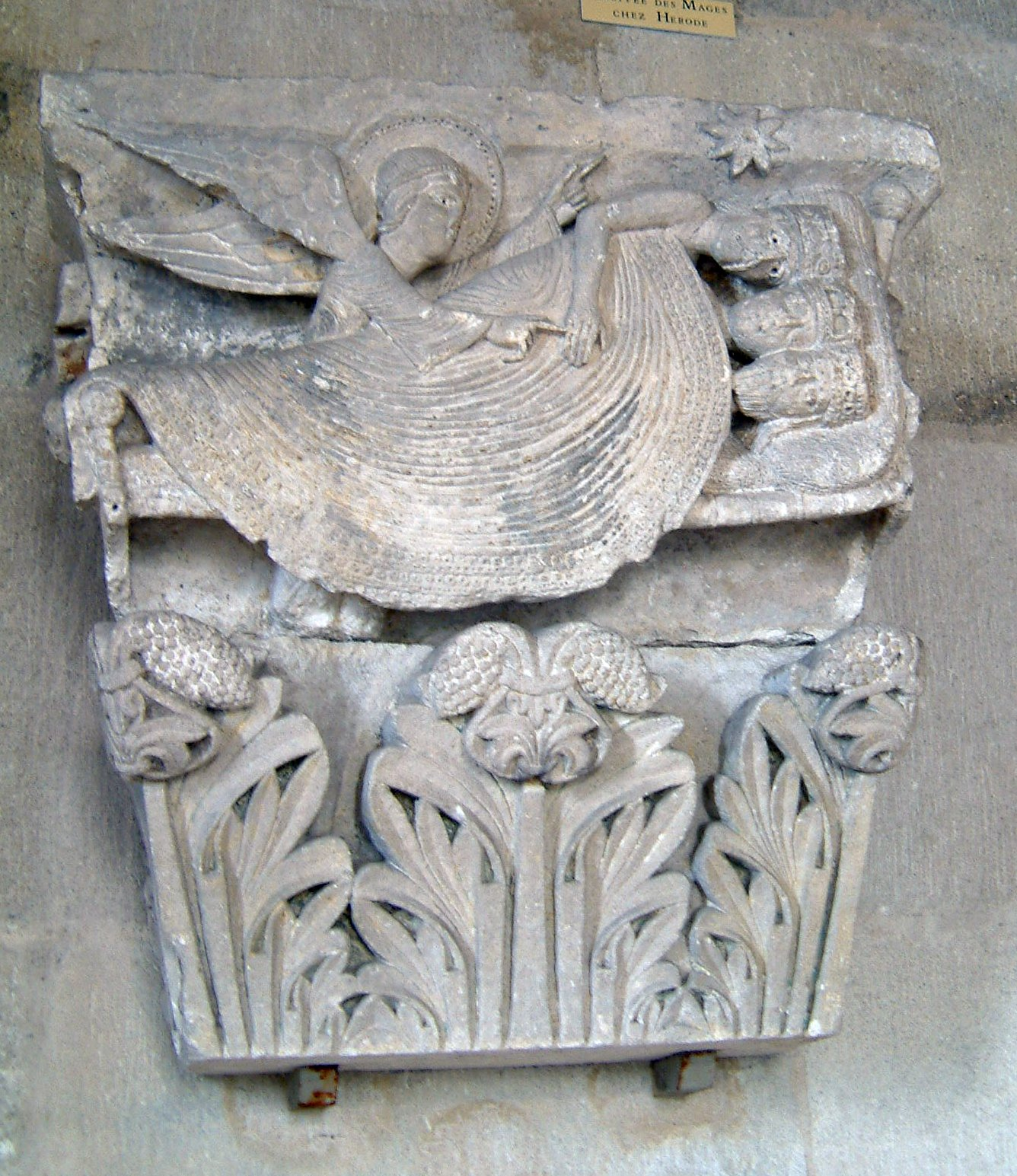
Three Magi Capital

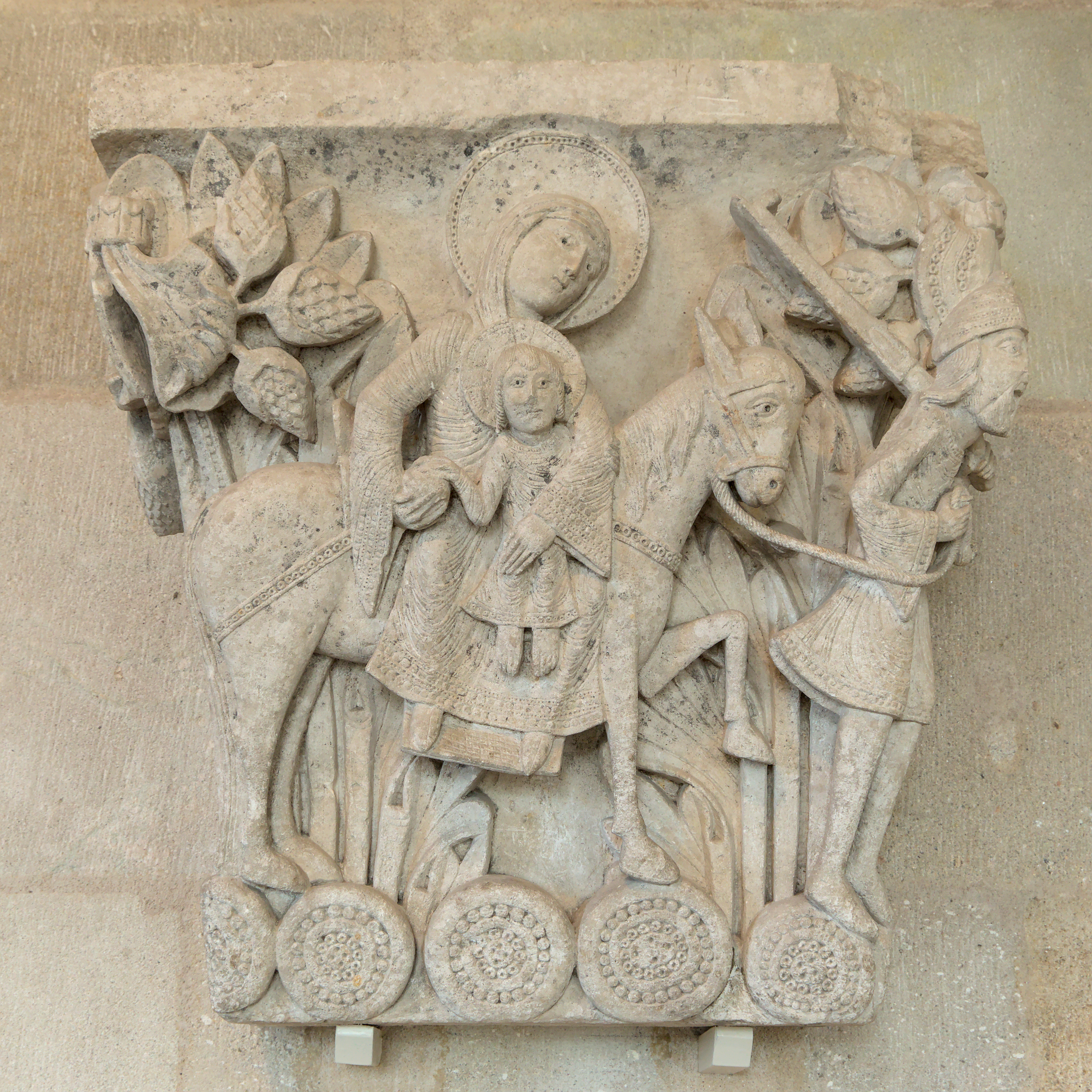
Flight into Egypt

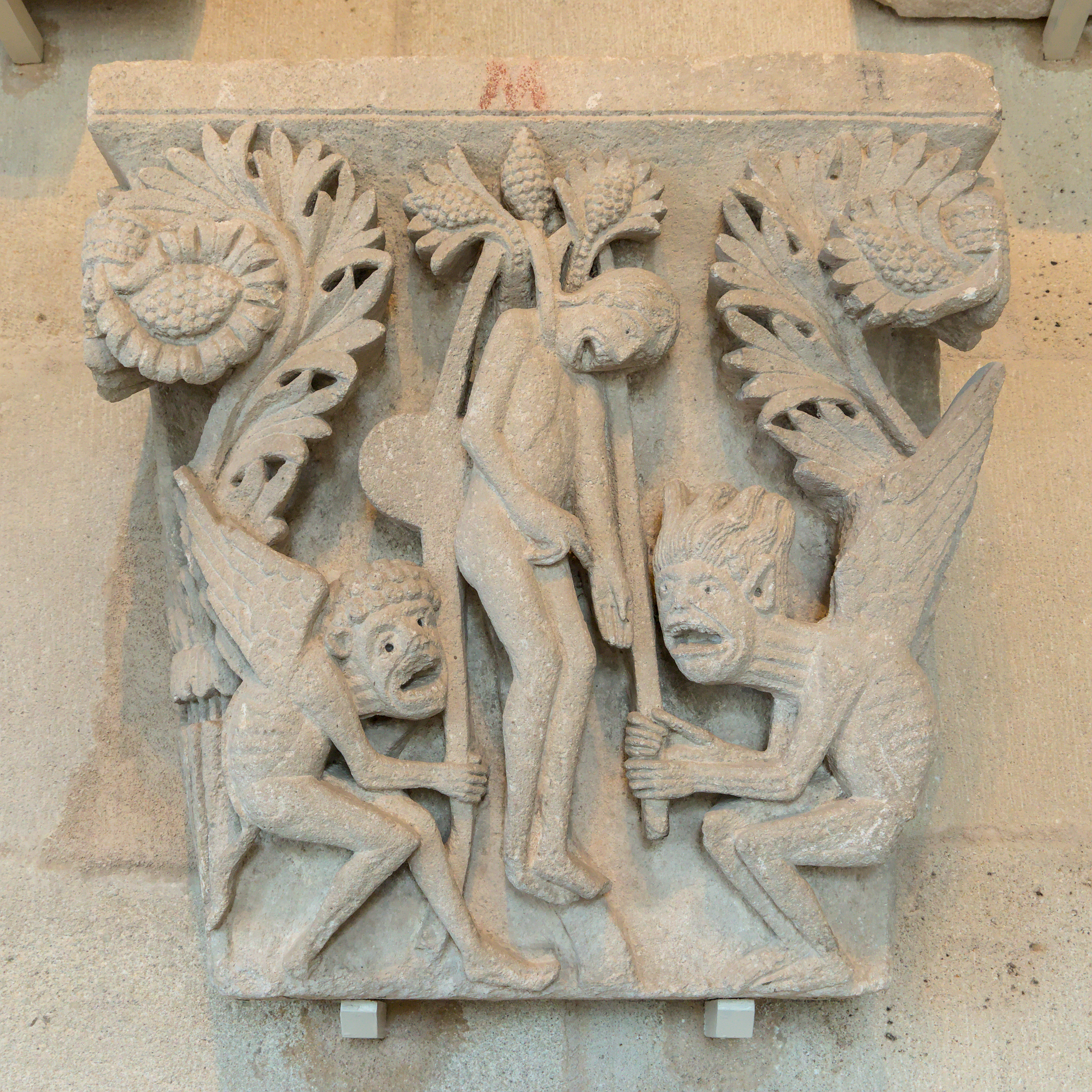
The Hanging of Judas

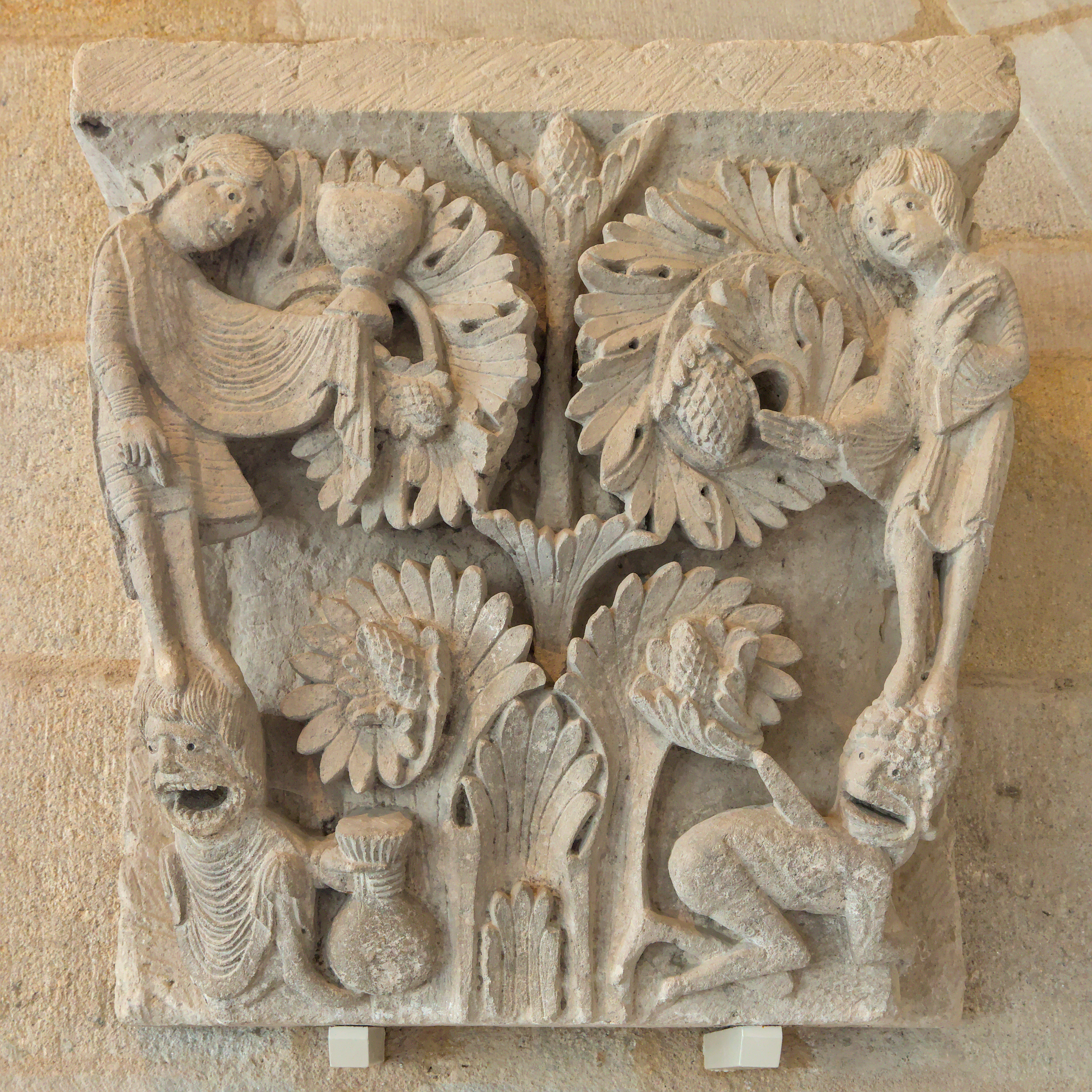
Vices and Virtues Capital

== The Temptation of Eve ==
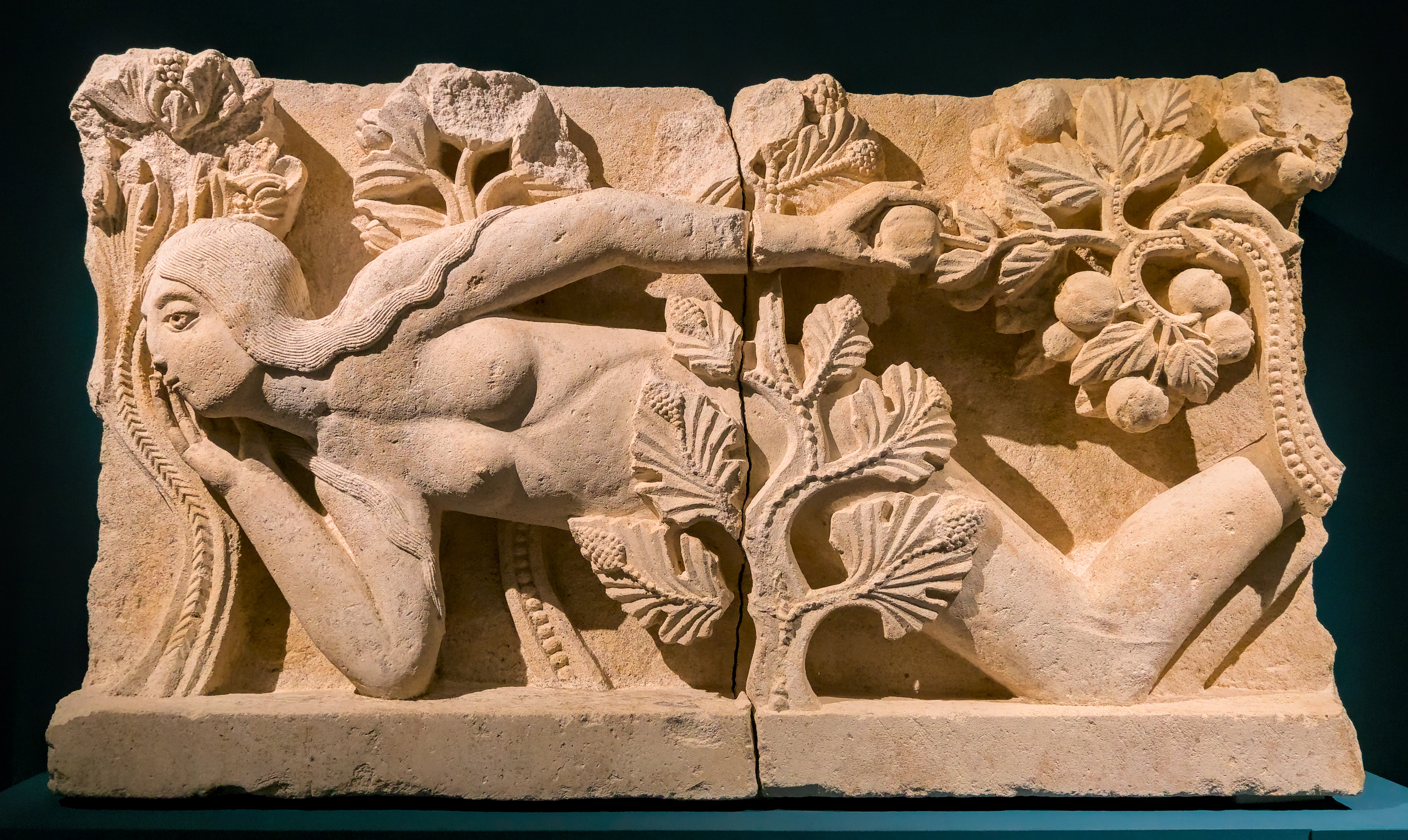
The Temptation of Eve, now at the Rolin museum.

Gislebertus' Temptation of Eve (French: La Tentation d'Ève) was originally the lintel of the north door of the cathedral. It is stated that the Temptation of Eve was created around the 1130s at the same time in which the Last Judgment and the narrative capitals were made. This large sculpture is now displayed in the Musée Rolin, Autun, France.

== The Last Judgment tympanum ==
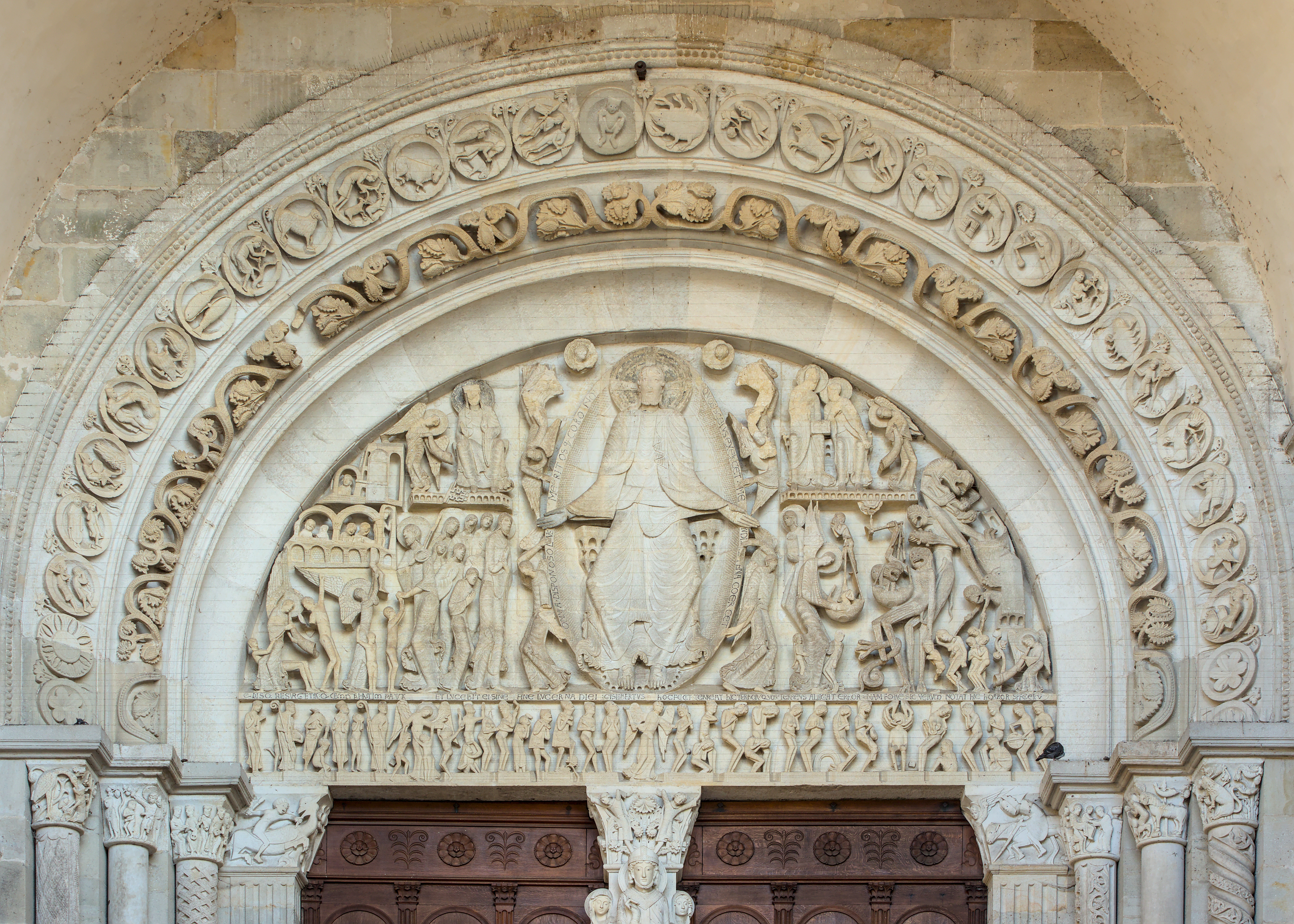
Last Judgment by Gislebertus in the north tympanum

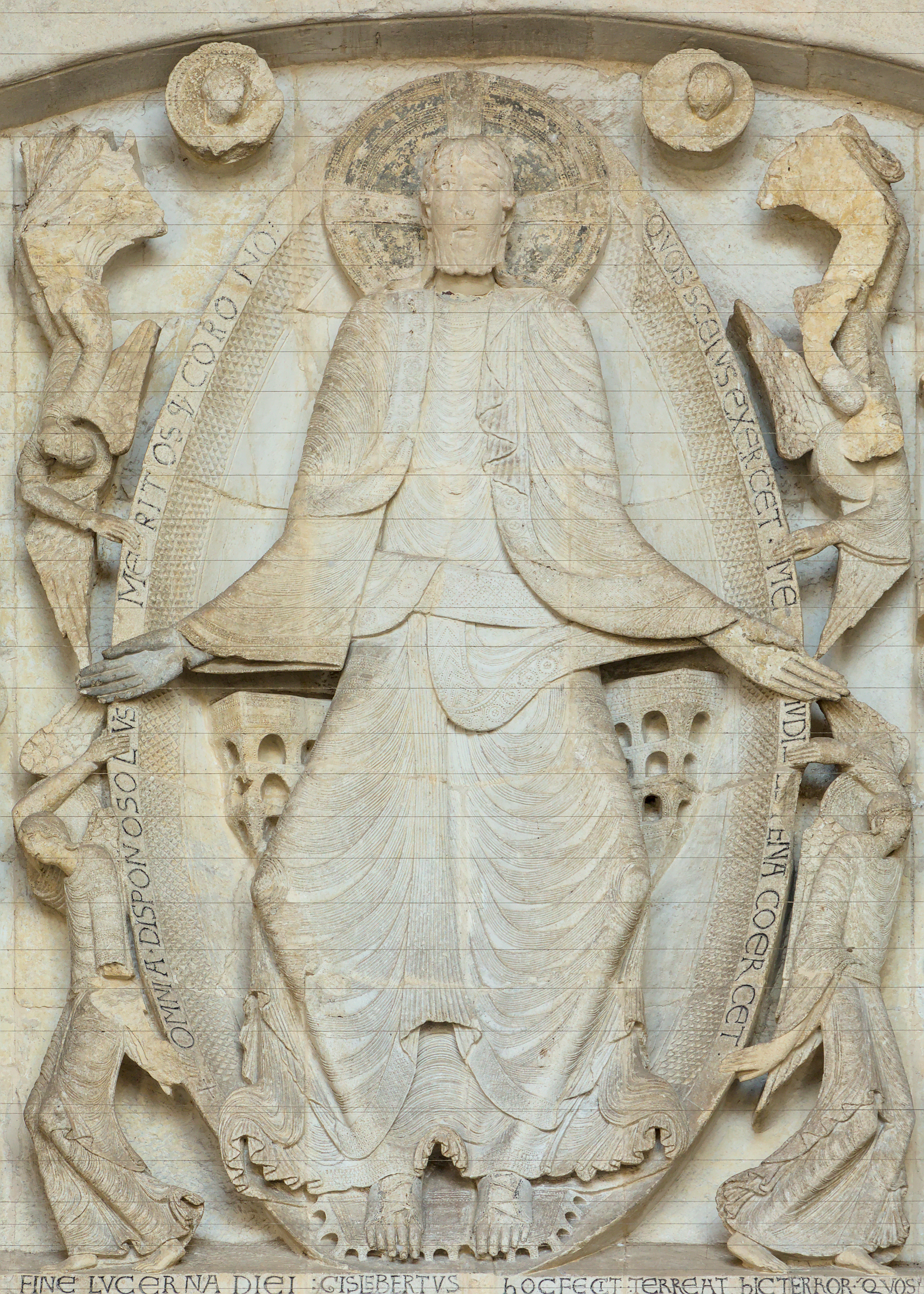
Christ in a mandorla carried by four angels.

The Last Judgment is believed to have been created around 1130. The tympanum was saved from potential ruin as the canons who were managing the cathedral in the eighteenth century believed that Gislebertus' work was ugly, they covered it with plaster. The tympanum was rediscovered and released from the plaster in 1837.

In 1766, the canons decided that the sculpture was not worth keeping because it was mediocre. They then covered everything in a layer of plaster in order to affix other art work on top of the tympanum. Not until 1837 when another canon curiously began to chip away at the plaster was the tympanum discovered. Luckily, it was preserved underneath the plaster with the exception of the head of Christ which was documented to have been removed so that the plaster could fill the tympanum completely.

The North façade of St. Lazare contains the tympanum (1130–1135), signed Gislebertus hoc fecit ("Gislebertus made this") within the portico which is ranked amongst the masterpieces of Romanesque sculpture in France. However, art historian Linda Seidel challenged this reading, arguing that instead Gislebertus was a patron.

The sheer size of the tympanum required that double lintels support it with a middle column to further support the sculpture. The left side of the tympanum displays the rise to the heavenly kingdom, and on the right is a portrayal of the demons in hell with an angel and a devil weighing the souls on a balance.

Zodiac signs surround the arch vault with Christ in the center portrayed as a serene figure. Christ is placed in perfect symmetrical position with a balanced composition of elongated figures. Jesus is flanked by his mother, the Virgin Mary and his apostles cast as penitents and observers of the last judgment. St. Peter guards the gate to heaven and looks on as resurrected individuals attempt to squeeze in with the assistance of the angels.

Gislebertus successfully integrated the modern view of heaven and hell and created a sculpture that would act as a visual educational device for individuals that were illiterate. Viewing the tympanum would allow pilgrims to know what would happen to them if they were to end up in hell. Two men near the centre of the lintel carry bags bearing a cross and a seashell. These are the symbols of pilgrims that travelled from Jerusalem to Santiago de Compostela.

The tympanum would have inspired terror in believers that passed beneath it and viewed the detailed high relief sculpture. The bottom of the tympanum underneath the weighing of the souls has an inscription that states, "May this terror terrify those whom earthly error binds for the horror of the images here in this manner truly depicts what will be". The tympanum is framed by two archivolts. The inner one has carved foliage while the outer archivolt consists of magnificently detailed medallions representing the four seasons, zodiacs, and labors of the months.

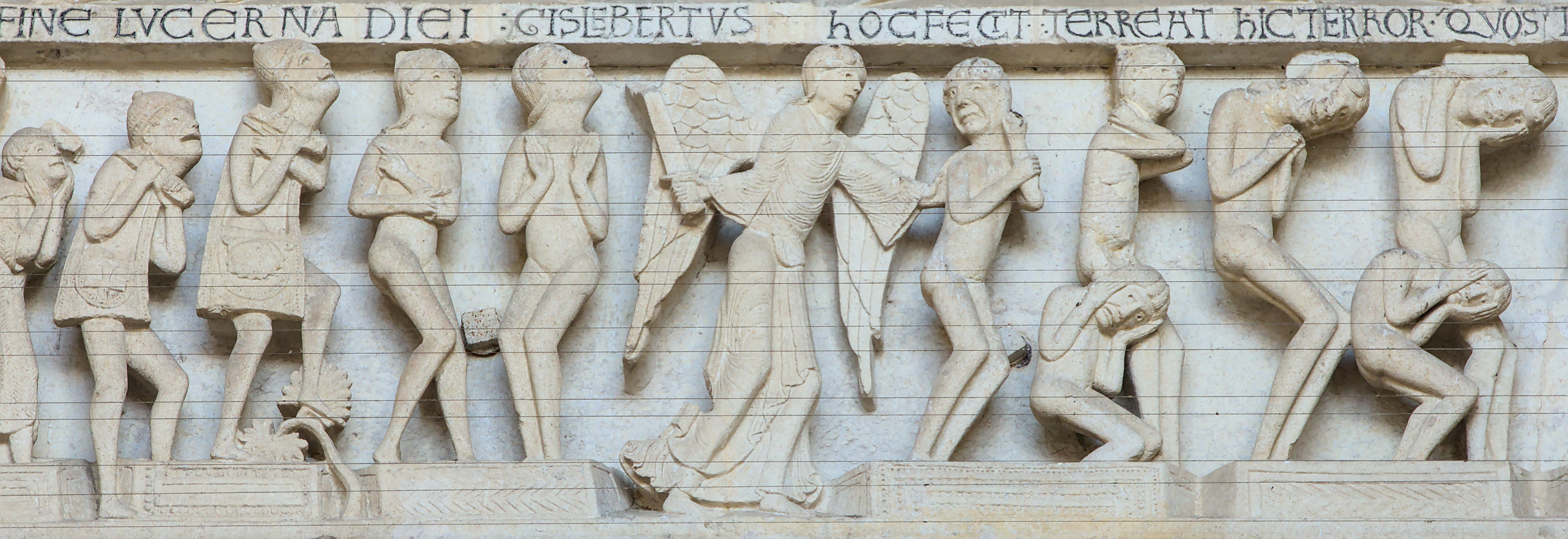
Detail of the lintel : the Saved (left) are separated from the Damned (right) by an angel.

There have been various attempts to explain the fact that the figures and scenes on the lintel seem to be an unnecessary doubling of some of the figures and scenes from the main relief. It was argued, for example, that the people represented on the lintel await judgement or that the scene represents the idea of "particular judgement" as opposed to "general judgement", which is represented on the main relief. Dębicki rejects all these interpretations. According to him, the symbolism of the relief consistently reflects the theological views expressed by Honorius Augustodunensis in his Elucidarius. Specifically, the doubling is based on the idea that "on judgement day two classes [of people] will be divided into four" (in die judicii duo ordine in quattuor dividentur): the figures on the lintel represent the two general classes of people (the saved and the damned), while the figures on the tympanum represent the four particular classes. Meanwhile, Philippe Ariès suggests that the two scenes in the tympanum represent distinct and even exclusive conceptions of the resurrection. In the scene on the left, the "fate of the dead is determined from the moment of their resurrection" and they move directly either to paradise or to hell, while in the scene on the right, the depicted "judicial operations" stand between the moment of resurrection and the final judgement.

== Zodiac ==
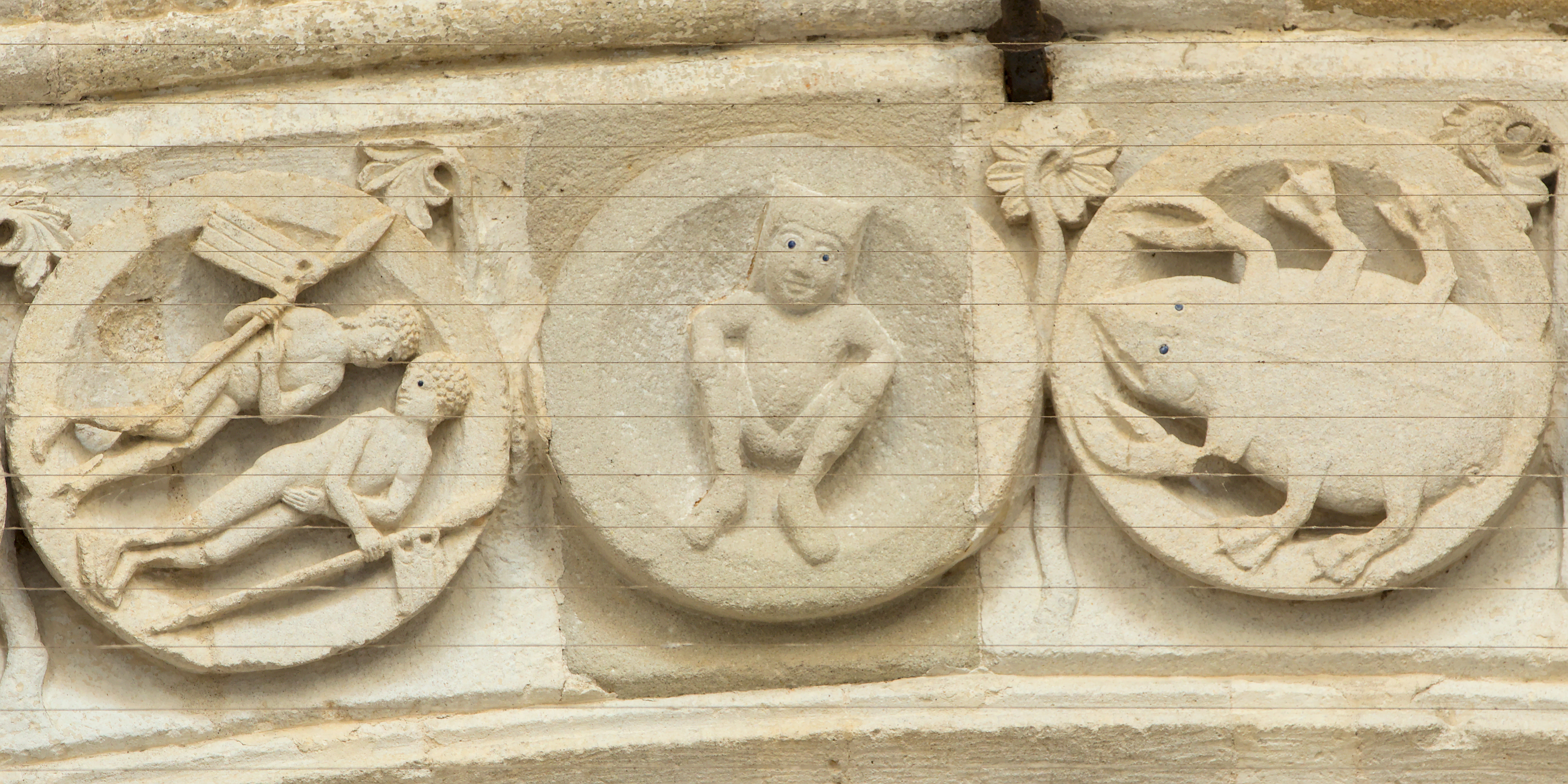
The tympanum is bordered on the outside by a series of about thirty circular medallions, where alternate scenes of season and astrological signs. Here, Gemini and Cancer and, between them, a character that would symbolize the year.

From left to right, and clockwise, we recognize:

- Floral pattern with six petals.
- Disc (representing the Sun?) from which alternately radiate eight ears and eight leaves.
- Foreseeing him wearing a spike, the improvident crying in his clothes.
- The wise (in priest's habit?) and the madman (naked).
- January: A peasant cuts a piece of bread while heating himself in a fire.
- Aquarius: A character dressed in a simple cape (baths?) pours water.
- February: A peasant sitting on a chair warms up by the fire.
- Fish: Two head-to-spade fish, caught by the same fishing line.
- March: A farmer prunes the vine (or a fruit tree?).
- Aries: A ram passing bypassed.
- April: A farmer feeds a goat and a sheep (to take them to the fields?)14.
- Taurus: A passing bull bypassed.
- May: A banneret knight prepares for the exercise15 : he leads his horse, behind him we see his shield and his banner hanging on a spear.
- Gemini: Two naked young men each holding a banner.
- Summer Solstice: A seated character rules the annual cycle. This character would represent the year, according to an illumination in a Romanesque manuscript, the Chronicon zweifaltense minus (folio 6v.)16.
- Cancer: A huge crayfish.
- June: A character picks and eats the fruits of the trees.
- Leo: A passing lion.
- July: Hay harvest15, a man sharpens his fake.
- Virgo: An angel.
- August: Threshing wheat, a man holds a plague on bound sheaves of wheat18. He is shirtless, the braies knotted to avoid the bites of wheat.
- Libra: A woman checks the balance of a scale.
- September: A man steps the grapes he collects with his left hand.
- Scorpio: a "scorpion", represented by a kind of eight-legged toad.
- October: A man beats an oak tree to drop the acorns to feed his pigs (right of pasnage15)20.
- Sagittarius: A centaur shoots a bow.
- November: Collection of dead wood for the winter, a man carries a bundle on his back15.
- Capricorn: Mythological figure with goat's head, eagle wings, and fishtail.
- December: Slaughter of pigs.
- Floral pattern with six symmetrical petals of the first.

== See also ==
- List of Gothic Cathedrals in Europe
- Commons:Great Romanesque tympanums in France
- High medieval domes

== Sources ==
- Autun Cathedral at Structurae
- Autun Cathedral at archINFORM (in German)
- (in French) Art-Roman.net: La Cathédrale d'Autun
- (in French) L'Art Roman en Bourgogne: Autun
