= Saint-Lazare =

Saint-Lazare or St. Lazare may refer to:

== Places ==
=== France ===
- Rue Saint-Lazare, a street in Paris
- Gare Saint-Lazare, a railway station in Paris
  - Réseau Saint-Lazare, a network of railway lines originating from Gare Saint Lazare
- Saint-Lazare station (Paris Metro), a railway station in Paris
- Saint-Lazare Prison, Paris

=== Canada ===
- Saint-Lazare, Quebec, a suburb of Montreal
- St. Lazare, Manitoba, an unincorporated community

== Other uses ==
- Pierre Bertholon de Saint-Lazare (1741–1800), French physicist

== See also ==
- Autun Cathedral (Cathédrale Saint-Lazare d'Autun), Autun, France
