= Lazard (surname) =

Lazard is a French surname. Notable people with the surname include:

- Allen Lazard (born 1995), American football player
- Daniel Lazard (born 1941), French computer scientist
- Frédéric Lazard (1883–1948), chess master
- Gilbert Lazard (1920-2018), French linguist and Iranologist
- Gustave Lazard (1876–1949), French chess master, problemist and organizer
- Justin Lazard (born 1967), actor and model
- Luckner Lazard (1928–1998), Haitian painter and sculptor
- Michel Lazard (1924-1987), French mathematician who introduced Lazard's universal ring
- Naomi Lazard (1928–2021), American poet
- Sasha Lazard, American singer
- Sidney H. Lazard (1930–2015), American bridge player
- Simon Lazard (1828–1898), Franco-American banker
