= Lăzărești =

Lăzăreşti may refer to several villages in Romania:

- Lăzăreşti, a village in Moșoaia Commune, Argeș County
- Lăzăreşti, a village in Schitu Golești Commune, Argeș County
- Lăzăreşti, a village in Bumbești-Jiu Town, Gorj County
- Lăzăreşti, a village in Cozmeni Commune, Harghita County
- Lăzăreşti, a village in Bărăști Commune, Olt County

== See also ==
- Lazăr (name)
