= Lazar BVT =

Light tactical military vehicle

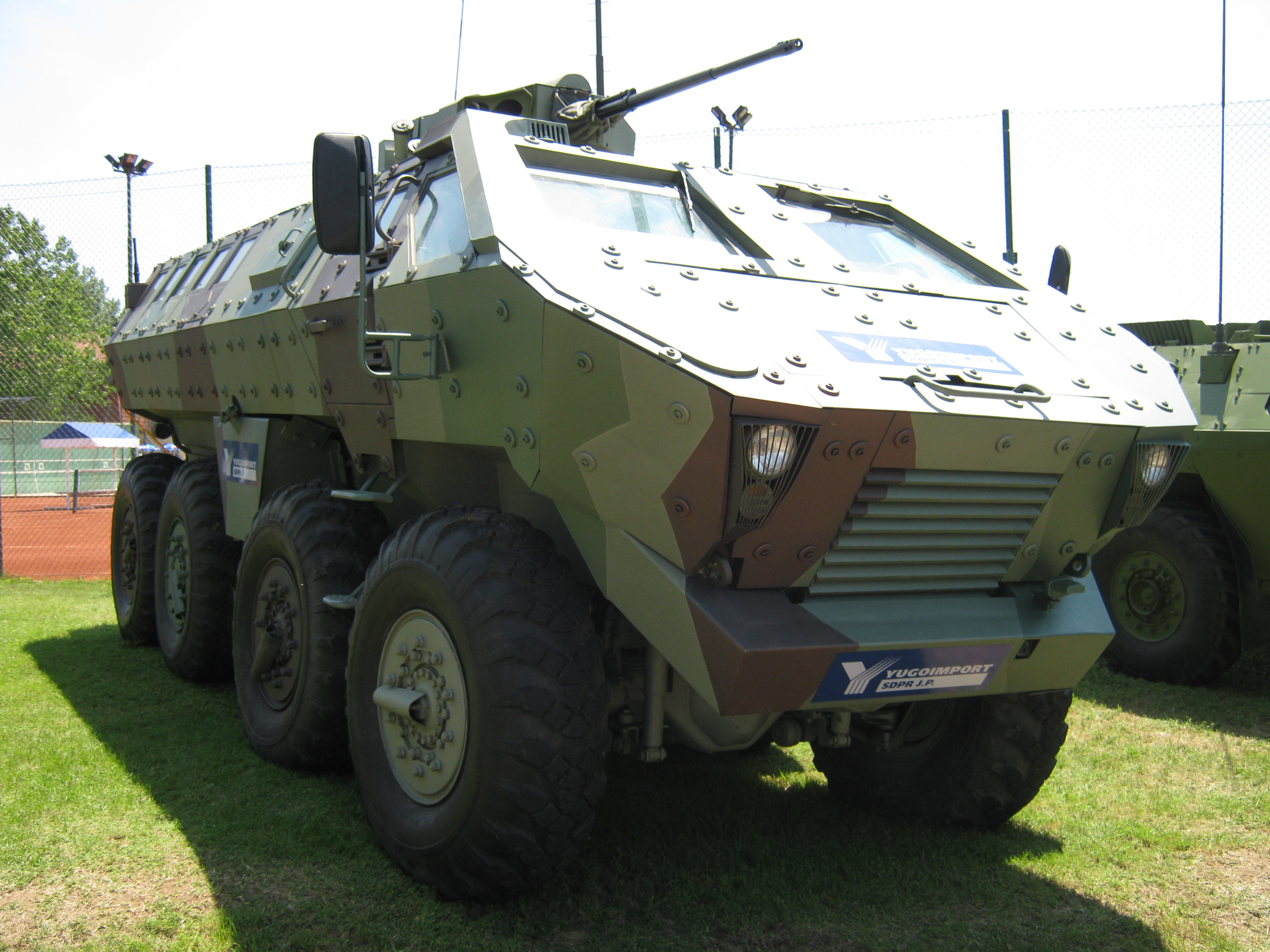
- Type: MRAP
- Place of origin: Serbia

Production history
- Designer: Yugoimport SDPR
- Designed: 2008
- Manufacturer: Yugoimport SDPR

Specifications
- Mass: 16.3 t empty basic (with applique 28 t)
- Length: 7.25 m (23 ft 9 in)
- Width: 1.5 m – 2 m
- Height: 2.45 m (up to armored hull roof)
- Crew: 3 + 10 passengers
- Armor: Basic Lv.III, Applique Lv.V
- Main armament: 20×110mm Autocannon M55
- Secondary armament: 7.62mm gun, 30mm grenade launcher
- Engine: diesel 440 hp
- Suspension: 2×2 tandem axles
- Operational range: 600 km before refueling
- Maximum speed: 90 km/h (56 mph)

The Lazar BVT is a Serbian mine resistant ambush protected vehicle (MRAP), produced by Yugoimport SDPR. Officially unveiled in 2008, project failed to advance to serial production.

== Design ==
Lazar was a vehicle conceived for use in urban and rural anti-infantry patrol and transport role, a supplementary vehicle meant to prevent exposure of even basic infantry units to enemy fire as well as to run support of heavier vehicles in convoy situations. The chassis was started as a simple redesign of the TAM-150 truck but evolved to include a completely modified hull, 4×4 and 8×8 configuration, added armor and dozens of structural improvements. Special attention was given to a high acceleration rate, stability (due to high center of gravity), hardiness and reliability in many types of environments (fire, snow, ice, rain, mud etc.). During testing, the vehicle outperformed every parameter except the weight requirement, which was exceeded in full armor and armament load-out, although the report excused this by saying that the extra weight does not degrade vehicle function.

=== Protection ===
This vehicle has a standard steel hull with STANAG level III+ protection in the basic configuration, although additional laminate armor developed by Jugoimport provides an upgrade to NATO STANAG 4569 agreement level V+ armor protection. In addition to the two armor configurations mentioned, both can be upgraded with ERA packets for protection against close range urban attacks with RPG weapons, as well as cages and other means of protecting against heavy fire. The armor itself can be considered NERA and is meant only to protect against infantry portable weapons. The ballistic glass is extremely strong, rated at level III in the front and level II+ at the sides. In addition, the specially formatted hull and internal seating arrangement affords maximum protection against IED devices, anti-tank mines and other ground-level explosive devices.

=== Mobility ===
The V-shaped hull and special drive train construction affords excellent mobility in mud pit situations, over deep trenches, icy and slippery surfaces as well as inclines smaller than 50 degrees. Each wheel and tire has centrally controlled pressure and is created in such a way as to be useful even if the tires are completely destroyed (run flat inserts); the quick lock mechanism allows for fast replacement. The 440 HP engine provides good acceleration but low speed over treacherous terrain, a standardized mechanical transmission allows for direct control. Steering and suspension both are primarily hydraulic and both have mechanical backups. Brakes are dual circuited pneumatics and have an on-off ABS switch in the cab. The range is 600 km and the top speed is 90 km/h. Wheel configuration is independent and allows fording to 1.5 meters deep and trench hopping at 2m of depth.

=== Ordnance ===
The thing which stands out about the Lazar is the open side system which allows troops inside to use their own personal weapons (40 mm grenade launchers, assault rifles etc.) to engage the enemy or help locate threats in a 360-degree area. Of course, in addition to this open-concept system, there are a variety of turrets, cupolas and other weapons systems depending on budget and application of vehicle.

Cupola options:

- 7.62×54mmR machine gun M86

OR

- 30 mm grenade launcher BGA-30 (Serbian license-built AGS-17)

Turret options:

- 12.7×108mm machine gun M87/M02/M07 and 7.62×54mmR machine gun

OR

- 20×110mm cannon M55 (Yugoslav, now Serbian development based on the HS.804) and 7.62×54mmR machine gun

OR

- 30×170mm cannon M86 and 7.62×54mmR machine gun

OR

- 2 × AT missile system Malutka 2

All versions are equipped with 4 × FLIR and optical ECM smoke launchers. There is an internal space which can be used for transportation of MANPAD systems, larger machine gun setups, all types of food, ammunition, and other cargo.

== Proposed Variants ==
- Lazar SHORAD (Short Range Air Defense): anti-aircraft system with 30mm cannon M86 and 9K35 Strela-10 (SA-13 Gopher) missiles
- Lazar Ambulance: personnel cab removed to house an ambulatory section
- Lazar IFV: infantry fighting vehicle with an attached 20mm auto-cannon and grenade launcher (The auto-cannon can be used in an anti air role)

== See also ==
- Lazar (armoured vehicle)
