= ArchINFORM =

International architecture database

archINFORM
- Producer: archINFORM (Germany)
- Languages: German, English, French, Spanish, Italian

Coverage
- Disciplines: Architecture
- Record depth: Plans and images

Links
- Website: archinform.net

archINFORM is an online database for international architecture, originally emerging from records of interesting building projects from architecture students from the University of Karlsruhe, Germany.

The self-described "largest online-database about worldwide architects and buildings" contains plans and images of buildings both built and potential and forms a record of the architecture of the 20th century. The database uses a search engine, which allows a particular project to be found by listing architect, location or key word. It has been described by the librarian of the Calouste Gulbenkian Foundation as "one of the most useful reference tools concerning architecture available on the internet."
