= Lazar (armoured vehicle) =

Family of Serbian multi-purpose armoured vehicle

Lazar armoured vehicle
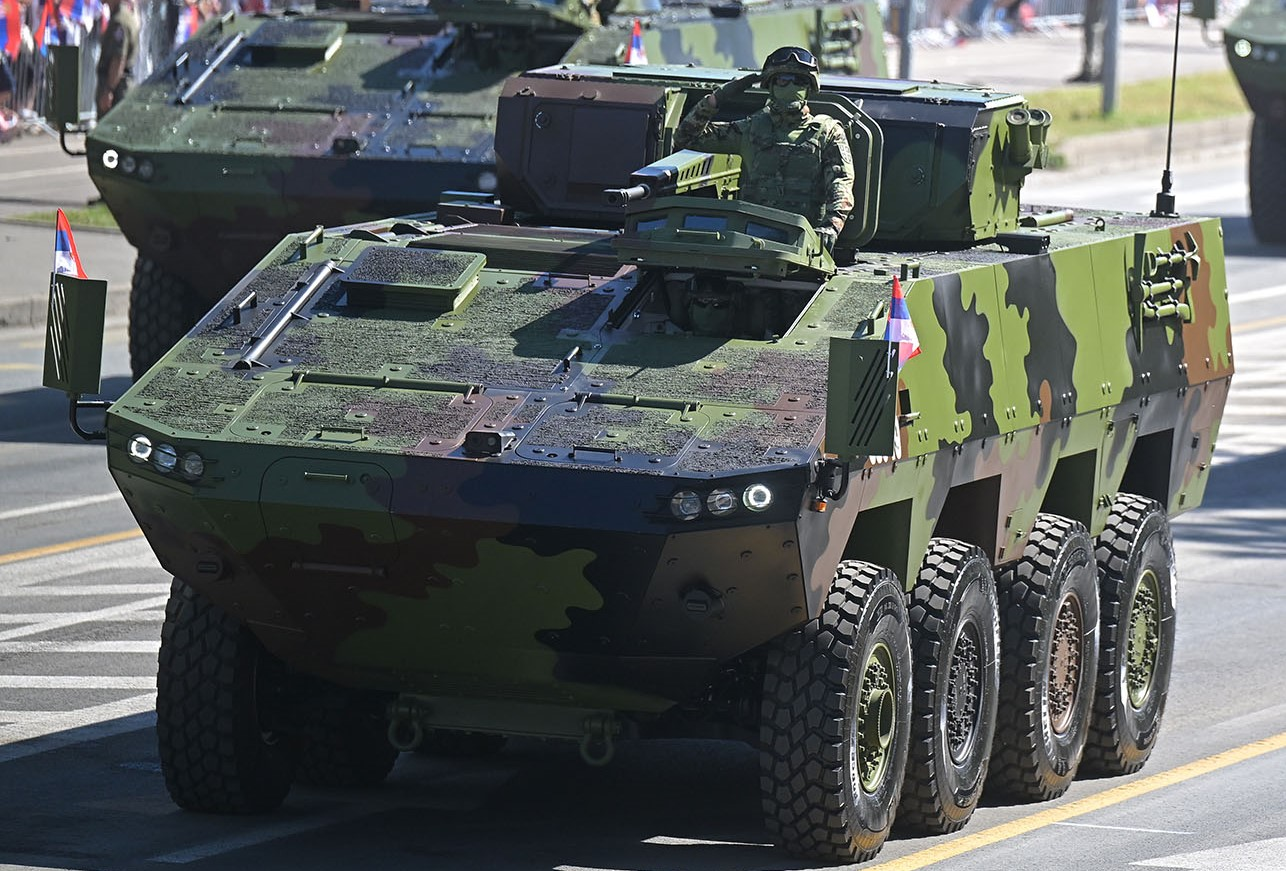
- Lazar 3M IFV of the Serbian Army
- Type: Armoured personnel carrier Infantry fighting vehicle
- Place of origin: Serbia

Production history
- Designer: Yugoimport SDPR
- Designed: 2008 (Lazar 1); 2013 (Lazar 2); 2017 (Lazar 3)
- Manufacturer: Yugoimport SDPR
- Variants: Lazar 1 Lazar 2 Lazar 3

Specifications
- Mass: up to 28,000 kg (62,000 lb)
- Length: 7.82 m (25.7 ft)
- Width: 2.85 m (9 ft 4 in) – 2.95 m (9 ft 8 in); 2.43 m (8 ft 0 in) track width
- Height: 2.32 m (7 ft 7 in) (hull roof)
- Crew: 3 (+9 passengers)
- Armor: Level IV STANAG and smoke grenade launchers for protection
- Main armament: 30 mm auto-cannon for IFV or 12.7 RCWS
- Secondary armament: 7.62mm gun and AT missiles for IFV version or none
- Engine: Diesel; 500 hp (370 kW)
- Suspension: 8×8 wheeled independent suspension
- Operational range: 800 km (500 mi)
- Maximum speed: 100 km/h (62 mph) – 110 km/h (68 mph)

The Lazar is a family of 8×8 wheeled armored personnel carriers (APCs) and infantry fighting vehicles (IFVs) developed by Serbian defense company Yugoimport SDPR. Designed for versatility in modern warfare, including anti-terrorism, peacekeeping, and conventional conflicts, the series emphasizes modularity and high mobility. The family, named after the Serbian medieval prince Lazar Hrebeljanović, includes three main variants: Lazar 1 (MRAP concept, unveiled in 2008), Lazar 2 (MRAV concept, unveiled in 2013), and Lazar 3 (armored personnel carrier and infantry fighting vehicle, introduced in 2017 and entered serial production in 2020).

== Variants ==
=== Lazar 1 ===
The first in the Lazar series was officially unveiled in 2008. It was designed for mine-resistant troop transport and patrol. Features a V-shaped hull for blast protection (STANAG 4569 Level II/III), powered by a 400 hp Cummins diesel engine. Armed with a 12.7 mm or 20 mm remote weapon station (RWS). Carries 3 crew + 9 troops, with a focus on urban and anti-terrorism operations.

Project failed to advance to serial production.

=== Lazar 2 ===
Lazar 2 was an evolution of Lazar 1, emphasizing modularity and independent suspension. The modifications are carried on with the purpose to further harmonize the basic characteristic of the vehicle with contemporary international trends in the development of families of multi-role armored wheel-type vehicles. The concept of the first Lazar vehicle represented a combination of the characteristics of MRAP and MRAV (Multirole Armoured Vehicle) type vehicles, while the Lazar 2 is closer to the MRAV concept first of all because of the introduction of independent suspension, which allows the platform to be customized to different roles. The concept provides for installation of different types of weapon turrets depending on the purpose of the vehicle.

The vehicle is equipped with a rear ramp for easier entrance and exit, and has two doors embedded within that ramp for emergency situations. It also features a separate door for the driver and commander, located on the driver side. It features five bullet proof windows and firing ports on each side of the vehicle, as well as two on the rear of the vehicle. This allows the troops inside the vehicle to have a high situational awareness and to engage targets from inside the safety of the vehicle. The driver has five cameras, which provide him with a near 360° field of visibility. Two are located in front of the driver's hatch, two are covering the sides of the vehicle, and one is installed in the rear of the vehicle to aid with reverse driving.

The vehicle is powered by a 500 hp engine and features independent suspension for each of its 8×8 powered wheels, ensuring high mobility even in rough terrain. France's Texelis supplied axles and suspension systems to Yugoimport for the 8×8 Lazar 2 and 3 APCs (T900 suspension with 24 vehicle sets delivered) and the 4×4 Milosh APC (T700 suspension with 12 vehicle sets delivered) with potential for additional orders.

Armored body of Lazar 2 presents modular construction, with possibilities of different level of protection, according to the needs of the user. Basic level of armored protection, without add-on armor corresponds to level III+ (12.7×99mm at 30m) at the front side of the vehicle, and level III (7.62×54mmR at 30m) on all other sides in accordance to NATO STANAG. With adding of additional composite armor over the basic armor of Lazar 2, protection goes up to level V (25 mm APDS-T at 500m) at the front of the vehicle, and level IV on all other sides. M91 30mm turret (Vidra) provides level IV (14.5×114mm at 200m) protection at the front glacis, and level III (7.62×54mmR at 30m) on the sides of the turret, with add-on armour being available for further protection. Additional slat armor can provide protection against RPG missiles. Anti-mine protection is provided with use of double layer, V-shaped steel floor, and additional steel plates under the seats, which are attached to the roof of the vehicle. This provides anti-mine protection of level IIa under any wheel, and level IIb under the center of the vehicle in accordance to NATO STANAG. Vehicle has few smoke grenade launchers which provide smoke screen used to mask movement from enemy's units and weapons.

Project failed to advance to serial production.

=== Lazar 3 ===
The most advanced version, with upgraded armor (STANAG 4569 Level IV/V) and a refined V-hull for 6–8 kg TNT blast resistance. Powered by a 400 hp Cummins ISL engine, it features a hydropneumatic suspension and modular turrets (e.g., 30 mm M91 Vidra or 32V01 RWS). Carries 3 crew + 9 troops, and comes in two variants: armoured personnel carrier and infantry fighting vehicle.

In service with Serbian Armed Forces and the Armed Forces of Turkmenistan.

== Operators ==
- Pakistan
  - Pakistan Armed Forces – 23 Lazar 2
- Serbia
  - Serbian Armed Forces – 60 Lazar 3 armoured personnel carriers and 20 Lazar 3M infantry fighting vehicles
  - Gendarmery – 12 Lazar 3 armoured personnel carriers
- Turkmenistan
  - Armed Forces of Turkmenistan – 24 Lazar 3M infantry fighting vehicles on order

== Gallery ==
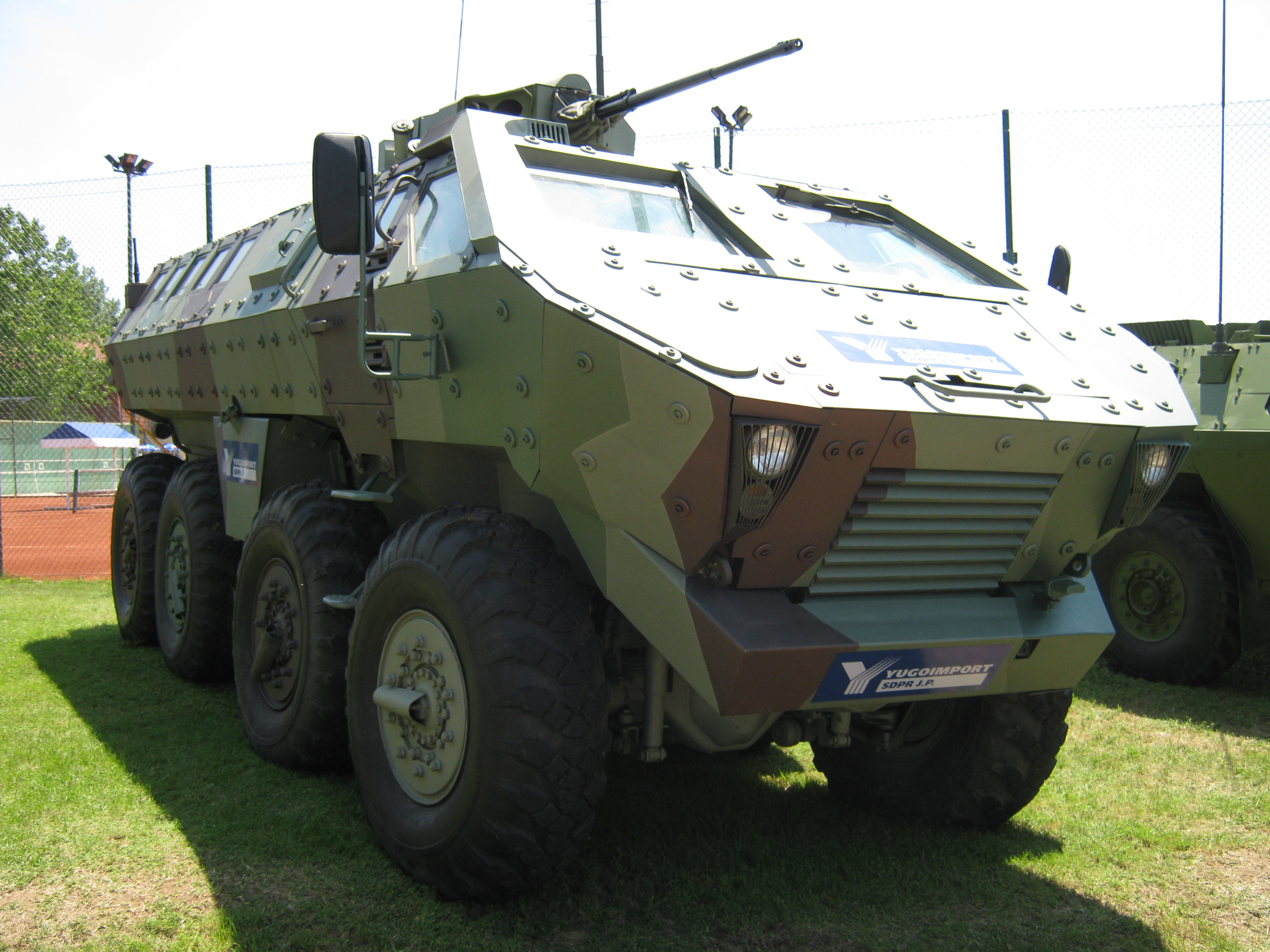
Lazar 1 MRAP

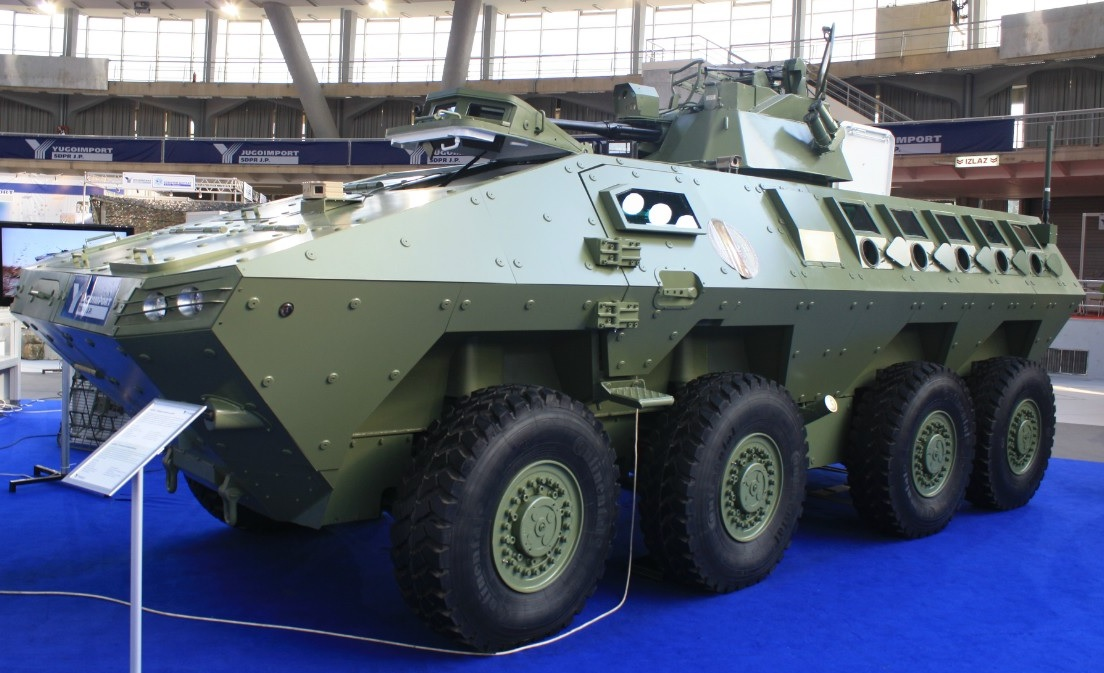
Lazar 2 armoured personnel carrier

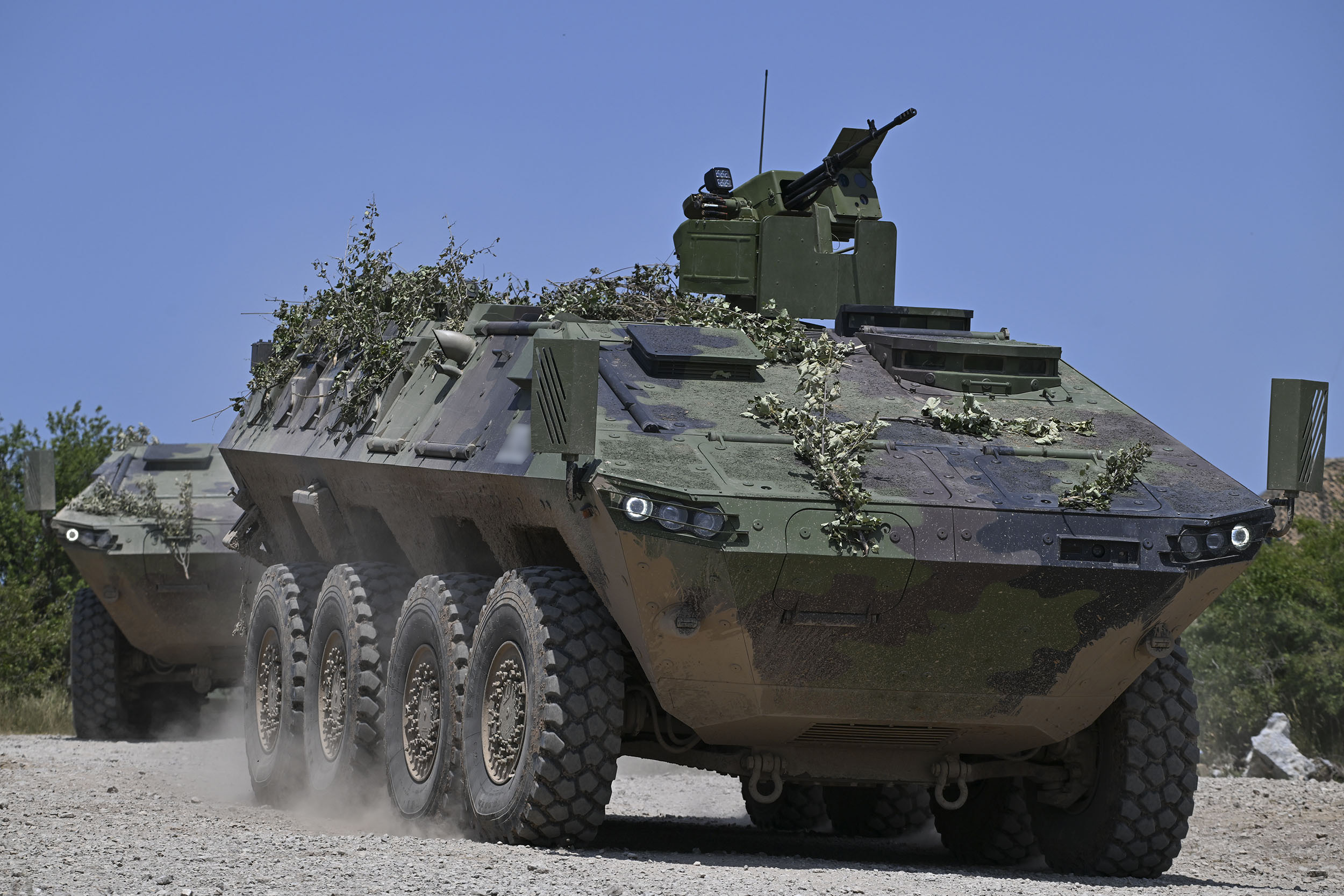
Lazar 3 armoured personnel carrier

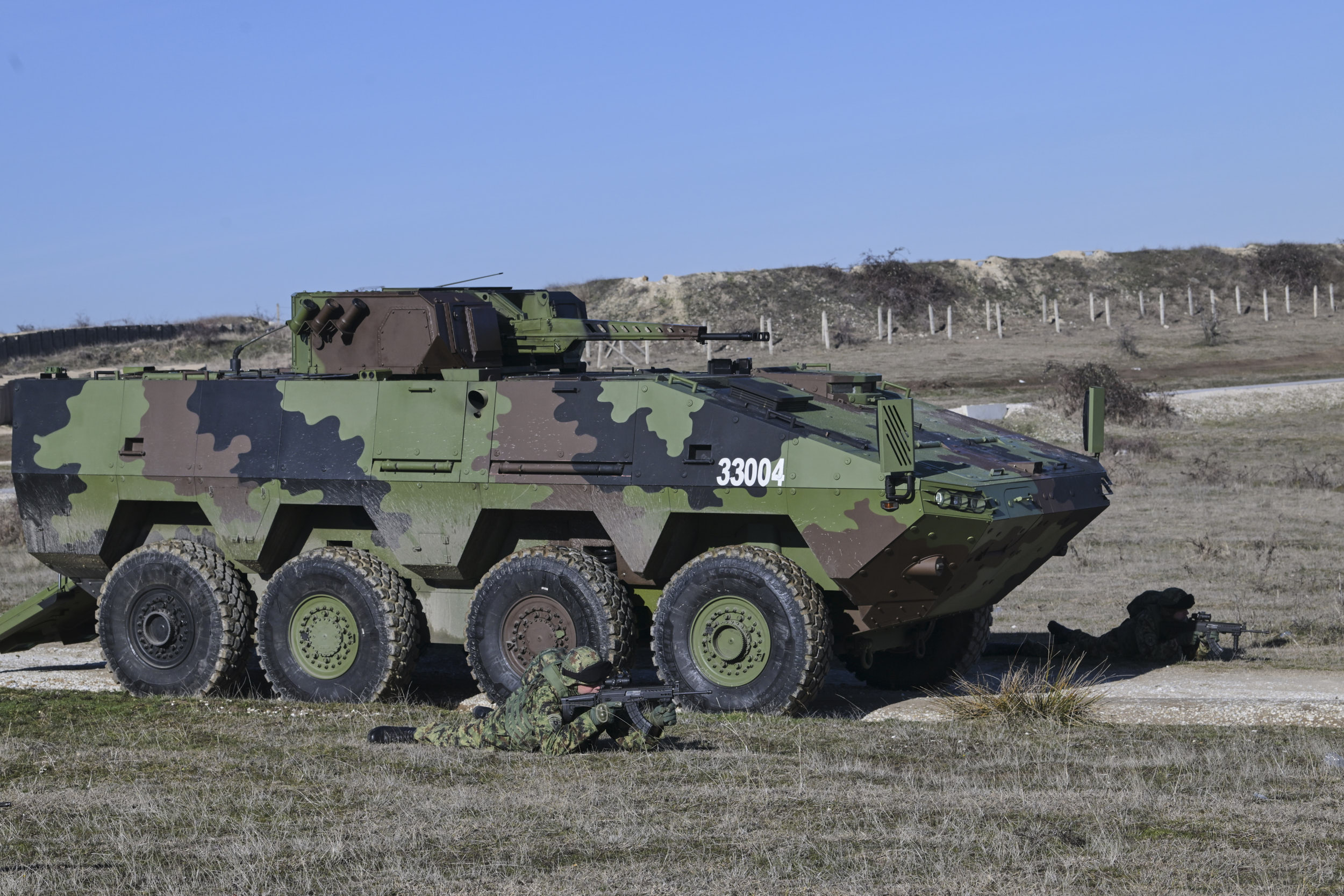
Lazar 3M infantry fighting vehicle
