= Laser (disambiguation) =

A laser is a device which generates a coherent beam of light.

Laser may also refer to:

== Transportation ==
- Laser (dinghy), a class of small sailing boat
- Ford Laser, a compact car sold mainly in Asia Pacific markets from 1980 to 2003
- Chrysler Laser, a hatchback car sold from 1985 to 1986
- Plymouth Laser, a sports coupe sold from 1989 to 1994
- LASER Airlines, an airline based in Venezuela

== Computing ==
- MPEG-4 Part 20, a rich media standard (LASeR – Lightweight Application Scene Representation)
- VTech Laser 200, an 8-bit home computer family
- Laser 128, a clone of the Apple II home computer

== People ==
- Christine Laser (born 1951), German athlete
- Dieter Laser (1942–2020), German actor

== Other uses ==
- Lasers (album), by Lupe Fiasco
- Laser (debit card), a former Irish debit card scheme
- Laser (plant), a plant genus of the family Apiaceae
- Laser (roller coaster), a German portable roller coaster
- David Copperfield's laser illusion (known as "The Laser")
- Longeau, Belgium (Luxembourgish: Laser), a village of Wallonia
- Leonardo Art Science Evening Rendezvous, a lecture series
- Silphium (antiquity), an extinct plant which produced the resin laser

== See also ==
- Atom laser
- Lazar (disambiguation)
- Lazer (disambiguation)
- Lase (disambiguation)
