= Eliezer (disambiguation) =

Eliezer (Hebrew: אליעזר, "God is my help") was the name of at least three biblical personalities.

Eliezer may also refer to:

== Rabbinic sages ==
=== Tannaim ===
- Eliezer ben Hurcanus, Tanna (sage) of 1st and 2nd century Judea
- Eliezer ben Jacob I, Tanna of the 1st century
- Eliezer ben Jacob II, Tanna of the 2nd century
- Eleazar ben Judah of Bartota, Tanna of the first and second centuries

=== Tosafists ===
- Eliezer ben Joel HaLevi (1140–1225), Rabbinic scholar in Germany
- Eliezer ben Yose Haglili (2nd century), Jewish rabbi who lived in Judea
- Eliezer ben Samuel (died 1175), French author of the halachic work Sefer Yereim
- Eliezer of Touques (13th century), French tosafist

== Other people with first name Eliezer ==
- Eliézer Alfonzo (born 1979), American baseball player
- Eliezer Adler (1866–1949), English Jewish community founder
- Eliezer Avtabi (born 1938), Israeli politician
- Eliezer ben Elijah Ashkenazi (1512–1585), Talmudist
- Eliezer ben Isaac ha-Gadol, 11th-century German rabbi
- Eliezer ben Nathan (1090–1170), Rishon
- Eliezer Ben-Yehuda (1858–1922), Hebrew lexicographer
- Eliezer Berkovits (1908–1992), rabbi
- Eliezer Berland (born 1937), Israeli rosh yeshiva
- Eliezer Cadet (born 1897), Haitian Vodou priest
- Eliezer Cogan (1762–1855), English scholar and divine
- Eliezer Cohen (born 1934), Israeli politician
- Eliezer Yehuda Finkel (b. 1879) (1879–1965), Lithuanian rabbi
- Eliezer Yehuda Finkel (b. 1965), Israeli rabbi
- Eliezer Kahana (?–?), 18th-century Jewish preacher
- Eliezer Margolin (1875–1944), Russian-Australian businessman and military officer
- Eliezer Melamed (born 1961), Israeli rabbi and rosh yeshiva
- Eliezer Mizrahi (born 1945), Israeli politician
- Eliezer Moses (born 1946), Israeli politician
- Eliezer Marom (born 1955), Israeli Navy commander
- Eleazar of Worms (1176–1238), Talmudist
- Eliezer Palchinsky (1912–2007), rosh yeshiva
- Eliezer Papo (1785–1826), Bulgarian rabbi and author
- Eliezer Peri (1902–1970), Israeli politician
- Eliezer Zusia Portugal (1898–1982), first Skulener Rebbe
- Eliezer Poupko (1886–1961), Russian rabbi
- Eliezer Preminger (1920–2001), Israeli politician
- Eliezer Pugh (1814–1903), Welsh philanthropist
- Eliezer Rafaeli (born 1926), Israeli founding President of the University of Haifa
- Eliezer Rivlin (born 1942), Israeli judge
- Eliezer Ronen (1931–2016), Israeli politician
- Eliezer Sandberg (born 1962), Israeli politician
- Eliezer Schweid (born 1929), Israeli scholar
- Eliezer Sherbatov (born 1991), Canadian-Israeli ice hockey player
- Eliezer Shkedi (born 1957), CEO of El Al Airlines
- Eliezer Shostak (1911–2001), Israeli politician
- Eliezer Silver (1882–1968), American rabbinic leader
- Eleazar Sukenik (1889–1953), Israeli archeologist
- Eliezer Waldenberg (1915–2006), rabbi and dayan, known as the Tzitz Eliezer
- Eliezer Waldman (born 1937), Israeli rabbi and politician
- Eliezer Weishoff (born 1938), Israeli artist
- Elie Wiesel (1928–2016), Jewish-American professor, political activist, and author
- Eliezer Williams (1754–1820), Welsh clergyman and genealogist
- Eliezer Yudkowsky (born 1979), American decision theorist
- L. L. Zamenhof (1859–1917), Polish-Jewish doctor, linguist, and creator of Esperanto
- Eliezer Zussman-Sofer (1830–1903), Hungarian rabbi

== People with last name Eliezer ==
- Christie Jayaratnam Eliezer (1918–2001), mathematician, physicist and academic

== Other uses ==
- Yad Eliezer, a poverty-relief organization in Israel

== See also ==
- Eleazar (disambiguation), a name with a similar etymology
- Lazar (name), a name that is an abbreviation of Eliezer or Eleazar
