= Eleazar (disambiguation) =

Eleazar is a common Hebrew name. It may refer to:

== People ==
- Eleazar (given name), a list of people and biblical and apocryphal figures with the given name
- Eleazar, son of Aaron and second Kohen Gadol (High Priest) of Israel
- Eleazar, son of Abinadab, a keeper of the Ark of the Covenant
- Eleazar (son of Dodo), one of King David's warriors
- Eleazar (son of Pinhas), one of those in charge of the sacred vessels brought back to Jerusalem after the Babylonian Exile
- Eleazar Avaran, the younger brother of Judas Maccabeus
- Eleazar (2 Maccabees), a martyr described in 2 Maccabees 6
- Eleazar (c. 260–245 BC), Jewish High Priest during the Second Temple period
- Eleazar, name chosen by Frankish deacon Bodo upon his conversion to Judaism
- Eleazar (painter) (born 1954), Spanish painter
- Abraham Eleazar, fictitious author of a 1735 book on alchemy
- David Elazar (1925–1976), Chief of Staff of the Israel Defense Forces
- Guillermo Eleazar, Chief of the Philippine National Police
- Rosalind Eleazar, 21st century English actress
- Eli Lotar (originally Eliazar or Eleazar Lotar Theodorescu; 1905–1969), French and Romanian photographer and cinematographer

== Places ==
- Elazar, Gush Etzion, a small Israeli settlement in the West Bank near the site of Eleazar Maccabeus' fatal battle

== See also ==
- Eliezer
- Elessar
- Lazar (disambiguation)
- Lazarus (disambiguation)
