= Eleazar (given name) =

- Gender: Male

Origin
- Origin: Hebrew
- Meaning: God helps

Other names
- Related names: Lazar, Lazarus, Eliezer

Eleazar (Hebrew: אלעזר or Elazar, meaning "God has helped", el'azár) is a common Jewish masculine given name. The first known bearer of the name is Eleazar, son of Aaron and High Priest of Israel. Others with the name include:

== Figures in the Bible and apocryphal books ==
- Eleazar, son of Abinadab, a keeper of the Ark of the Covenant
- Eleazar (son of Dodai), one of King David's warriors
- Eleazar (son of Pinhas), one of those in charge of the sacred vessels brought back to Jerusalem after the Babylonian Exile
- Eleazar Avaran, the younger brother of Judas Maccabeus
- Eleazar (2 Maccabees), a Jewish martyr mentioned in 2 Maccabees chapter 6
- Eleazar, son of Eliud, mentioned briefly in the genealogy of Jesus (Matthew 1 verse 15)

== People ==
=== Ancient world ===
- Eleazar (c. 260–245 BC), Jewish High Priest during the Second Temple period
- Eleazar ben Ananus, Temple Captain in 66 CE who cancelled the sacrifices to Caesar
- Eleazar ben Azariah, first century Mishnaic scholar
- Eleazar ben Arach, one of the Tannaim of the first century CE
- Eleazar Chisma, second century CE tanna (sage)
- Eleazar ben Hanania (fl. 66 CE), a Jewish leader in the First Jewish–Roman War
- Eleazar ben Judah of Bartota, a tanna of the first and second centuries CE
- Eleazar of Modi'im (died sometime in the 130s CE during the Bar Kokhba revolt), Jewish scholar
- Eleazar ben Pedat, an Amoraim of the fourth century CE
- Eleazar ben Shammua, second century Mishnaic teacher of the 4th generation
- Eleazar ben Simon (died 70), one of the leaders of Jewish resistance in the First Jewish-Roman War

=== Middle Ages ===
- Eleazar of Worms (c. 1176–1238), Talmudist and Kabbalist
- Eleazar, name chosen by Frankist deacon Bodo (deacon) (c. 814–876) upon his conversion to Judaism

=== Modern world ===
- Eleazar Albin (fl. 1690–c. 1742), English naturalist and watercolourist illustrator
- Elazar "Eli" Dasa (born 1992), Israeli footballer for Dynamo Moscow and the Israel national team
- Eleazar Davidman, Israeli tennis player
- Eleazar Jiménez (1928–2000), Cuban chess International Master
- Eleazar Lipsky (1911–1993), American lawyer, novelist, playwright, president of the Jewish Telegraphic Agency
- Eleazar Lord (1788–1871), American banker, entrepreneur, author and educator
- Eleazar López Contreras (1883–1973), Venezuelan army general and president of Venezuela
- Elazar Shach (1898–2001), rosh yeshiva of the Ponevezh yeshiva and founded the Degel HaTorah political party
- Eleazar Soria (1948–2021), Peruvian footballer
- Eleazar Sukenik (1889–1953), Israeli archaeologist and professor
- Eleazar Swalmius (1582–1652), Dutch theologian known for his portrait by Rembrandt
- Eleazar Rodgers, South African footballer
- Eleazar Wheelock, founder and 1st president of Dartmouth College

== See also ==
- Eliezer
- Lazar (name)
- Lazarus (name)
- Eleazar (disambiguation)
