= Lazarus (name) =

Male given name and surname

- Gender: Male
- Name day: 29 July

Origin
- Origin: Hebrew
- Meaning: God has helped

Other names
- Derived: Eleazar
- Related names: Lazar

Lazarus is a given name and surname. The English form is from Late Latin Lazarus, which is from the Koine Greek name Lā́zāros (Λᾱ́ζᾱρος), derived from the Hebrew name Eleazar (אלעזר, Elʿāzār) meaning "God has helped".

== Biblical figures ==
- Lazarus of Bethany, described as being raised from the dead by Jesus in the Gospel according to John
- Lazarus, from the parable of the rich man and Lazarus in the Gospel according to Luke

== People ==
=== Given name ===
- Lazarus of Persia (died 326), martyr of the Christian church
- Lazarus of Aix (died 441), Christian bishop of Aix-en-Provence
- Lazarus (bishop of Milan), from 438 to 449, a saint in the Catholic Church
- Lazarus Zographos (died 867), Christian saint
- Lazarus Chakwera, Malawian president
- Lazarus Chigwandali, Malawian musician
- Larry Ferrari (1932–1997), American organist
- Lazarus Joseph (1891–1966), New York State Senator and New York City Comptroller
- Lazarus Nkala (1927–1975), Rhodesian political activist
- Lazarus Hammond Read (or Reed; c. 1815–1855), chief justice of the Supreme Court of the Utah Territory
- Lazarus Sinim (2003), Indonesian footballer
- Larry Zeidel (1928–2014), Canadian ice hockey player

=== Surname ===
- Abraham Lazarus (1911–1967), British politician
- Arnold Lazarus (1932–2013), South African-born clinical psychologist
- Bob Lazarus (1956–2009), American comedian
- Catie Lazarus (1976–2020), American comedian and writer
- Celestine Lazarus (born 1992), Nigerian footballer
- Charles Lazarus (1923–2018), American businessman, founder of Toys "R" Us
- Daniel Barnet Lazarus (1866–1932), Australian politician
- Edward Lazarus (born 1959), American author and lawyer
- Emma Lazarus (1849–1887), American Jewish poet
- Fred Lazarus Jr. (1884–1973), American businessman
- Glenn Lazarus (born 1965), Australian politician and former rugby league footballer
- Henry Lazarus (1815–1895), British clarinettist
- John Lazarus (born 1947), Canadian playwright
- Joseph Lazarus (1903–1943), US Olympic boxer
- Leon Lazarus (1919–2008), comics writer
- Luke Lazarus Arnold, Australian diplomat
- Mark Lazarus (1938–2025), English football player
- Mark Lazarus (businessman), American media executive and businessman
- Marx Edgeworth Lazarus (1822–1895), American anarchist
- Mell Lazarus (1927–2016), American cartoonist
- Moritz Lazarus (1824–1903), German philosopher
- Richard Lazarus (1922–2002), psychologist and creator of the coping theory
- Richard Lazarus, professor of law at the Harvard Law School
- Stephanie Lazarus (born 1960), American police officer convicted of murdering a romantic rival

== Dogs ==
- Lazarus (died 1863), famous dog from San Francisco, along with companion Bummer

== Fictional entities ==
- Lazarus, in the film Black Snake Moan
- Lazarus, a fictional machine in the film Casper
- Lazarus, in the video game Evolve
- Lazarus, a fictional virus in the TV series Sanctuary
- Lazarus, in the Star Trek TOS 1967 episode "The Alternative Factor"
- Lazarus Churchyard, in the comic series of the same name
- Archbishop Lazarus in the video game Diablo
- Dr. Lazarus, in the film Galaxy Quest
- Kirk Lazarus in the film Tropic Thunder
- Dr. Marian Lazarus, in the film Outland
- Sister Mary Lazarus in the musical Sister Act
- Professor Richard Lazarus in the Doctor Who episode "The Lazarus Experiment"
- Rina Lazarus, a character created by Faye Kellerman
- Lazarus Long, creator of the New Utopia scam
- Lazarus Long, created by Robert Heinlein
- Robert MacNichol (Lazarus) from Blair Witch Volume II: The Legend of Coffin Rock
- Lazarus, in the game The Binding of Isaac (video game)
- Project Lazarus, name of project of restoring Commander Shepard in Mass Effect 2
- Lazarus Herst, also known as Edmund Cloudsley, in the 2022 video game The Case of the Golden Idol
- Lazarus, a Perk from the shooter game Decaying Winter

== See also ==
- Lazar (name)
- Lazare (disambiguation)
- Lazarus (disambiguation)
