= Saint Lazarus =

Saint Lazarus may refer to:

- Lazarus the beggar, from the Rich man and Lazarus parable, traditionally venerated as a saint
- Lazarus of Bethany, New Testament figure resurrected by Jesus
- Lazarus (bishop of Milan), Catholic saint, Archbishop of Milan from 438 to 449
- Lazarus Zographos (died 865), a Byzantine Christian saint
- Saint Lazarus Church (disambiguation), also St. Lazarus' Church or Church of Saint Lazarus
- Order of Saint Lazarus, a medieval Catholic military order
- Order of Saint Lazarus (statuted 1910), a Christian honorific order
- Saint Lazarus cemetery, Chișinău, Moldova
- San Lazzaro degli Armeni, Venice, Italy, sometimes called Saint Lazarus Island in English

== See also ==
- Lazarus (disambiguation)
