= Lazarus =

Lazarus may refer to:

== People ==
=== Biblical figures ===
- Lazarus of Bethany, in the New Testament, purportedly raised from the dead by Jesus
- Lazarus, from the parable of the rich man and Lazarus

=== Other people ===
- Lazarus (name), a surname and a given name
- Lazarus of Persia (died 326), a martyr
- Lazarus of Aix (died 441), bishop of Aix-en-Provence
- Lazarus (bishop of Milan), from 438 to 449
- Lazarus Zographos (died 867), Byzantine Christian saint
- Lazarus (rapper), American rapper Kamran Rashid Khan
- Lazarus Chigwandali, Malawian musician commonly known as just 'Lazarus'

== Arts and entertainment ==
=== Film and television ===
- Lazarus (1902 film), an Australian religious film
- Lazarus, a 2015 film also known as The Lazarus Effect
- Lazarus (Japanese TV series), a 2025 anime television series
- Lazarus (British TV series), a 2025 crime drama television series
- "Lazarus" (The X-Files), a television episode, released on February 4, 1994
- "Lazarus" (Smallville), a television episode, released on September 24, 2010
- "Lazarus" (Shameless), an episode of the American TV series Shameless
- "Lazarus", episode 18 of Designated Survivor, released on April 26, 2017

=== Gaming ===
- Project Lazarus, a plot element in the game Mass Effect 2
- Ultima V: Lazarus, a 2005 fan remake of the RPG Ultima V using the Dungeon Siege engine

=== Music ===
==== Albums and compositions ====
- Lazarus (Schubert), an unfinished Easter cantata by Franz Schubert
- Lazarus (Lazarus album) (1971)
- Lazarus, a 2009 album by Hacride, and its title song
- Lazarus (Travie McCoy album) (2010)

==== Songs ====
- "Lazarus" (David Bowie song), 2015
- "Lazarus" (Porcupine Tree song), 2005
- "Lazarus", by the Boo Radleys
- "Lazarus", by David Byrne & St. Vincent from Love This Giant
- "Lazarus", by Chimaira from Chimaira
- "Lazarus", by Circa Survive from Appendage
- "Lazarus", by Corrinne May from Crooked Lines
- "Lazarus", by Fozzy from All That Remains
- "Lazarus", by moe. from Dr. Stan's Prescription, Volume 2
- "Lazarus", by Placebo from the "Meds" single
- "Lazarus", by Trip Lee from Rise, 2014
- "Lazarus", by V V Brown from Glitch, 2015
- "Lazarus", by Buffy Sainte-Marie from Many a Mile, 1965
- "Lazarus", by Dave & Boj from We're All Alone in This Together, 2011

==== Performers ====
- Lazarus (band), a 1970s American soft rock band
- Lazarus A.D., an American thrash/groove metal band originally named Lazarus

=== Other uses in arts and entertainment ===
- Lazarus (comics), a comic book series
- Lazarus (musical), 2015
  - Lazarus (soundtrack), 2016, by the New York cast

== Other uses ==
- Lazarus (department store), a defunct department store chain now branded as Macy's
- Lazarus (software), an integrated software development environment (IDE)
- Lazarus effect, in semiconductor physics
- Lazarus Group, a cybercrime group
- Lazarus Island, Singapore
- Lazarus sign, a reflex movement in brain-dead or brainstem failure patients
- Lazarus taxon, a taxon that disappears for one or more periods from the fossil record, only to appear again later
- Team Lazarus, an Italian motor racing team currently competing in the Auto GP series
- Lazarus (horse), a racehorse

== See also ==
- Saint Lazarus (disambiguation)
