= Abraham the Jew =

Abraham the Jew may refer to:

- Abraham, Hebrew patriarch in the Book of Genesis
- Abraham of Worms, Jewish magician in The Book of Abramelin
- Abraham Eleazar, Jewish alchemist

== See also ==
- Abraham (disambiguation)
- Jew (disambiguation)
