= Basilica of Sant'Eufemia, Milan =

Church in Milan, Italy

Coordinates: 45°27′27″N 9°11′19″E

Basilica of Saint Eufemia of Chalcedon (Basilica di Sant'Eufemia)
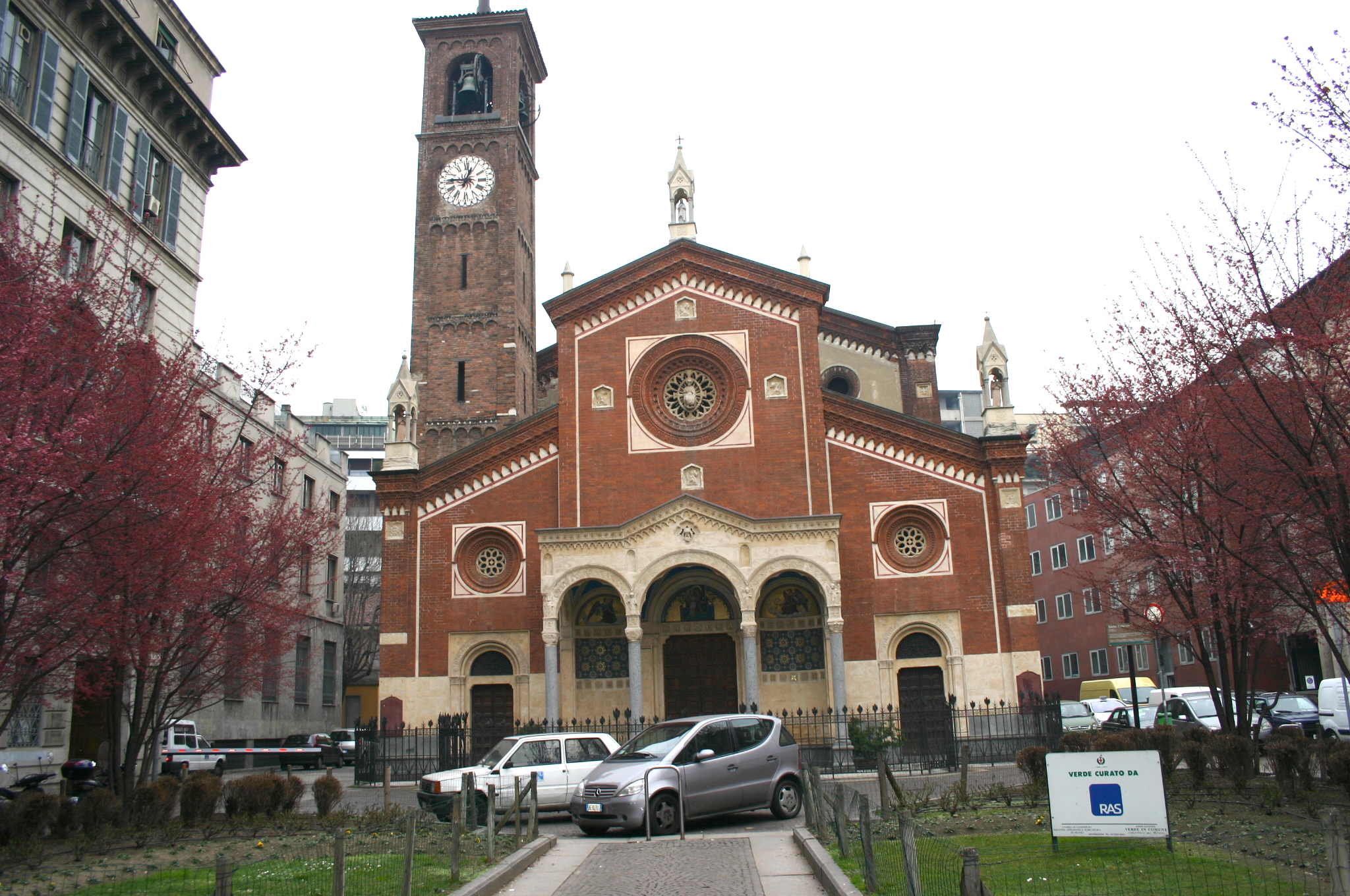
- Façade of the church.

Religion
- Affiliation: Roman Catholic
- Province: Milan
- Status: Active

Location
- Location: Milan, Italy
- Interactive map of Basilica of Saint Eufemia of Chalcedon (Basilica di Sant'Eufemia)

Architecture
- Architect: Enrico Terzaghi
- Type: Church
- Style: Romanesque Revival; Gothic Revival
- Groundbreaking: 5 century
- Completed: 1870

Basilica di Sant'Eufemia is a church in Milan, Italy. It was established in 472.

== History ==
The church was built in 472 by Bishop Senatore to house the relics of the martyr Euphemia. The bishop is buried in the church.

Sant'Eufemia was subsequently the subject of various alterations funded by generous patrons. The church was then rebuilt in the 15th century. Canon Pietro Casola describes a rogation day procession that left from the Cathedral of Santa Tecla to Sant'Eufemia and other churches before returning to the cathedral.

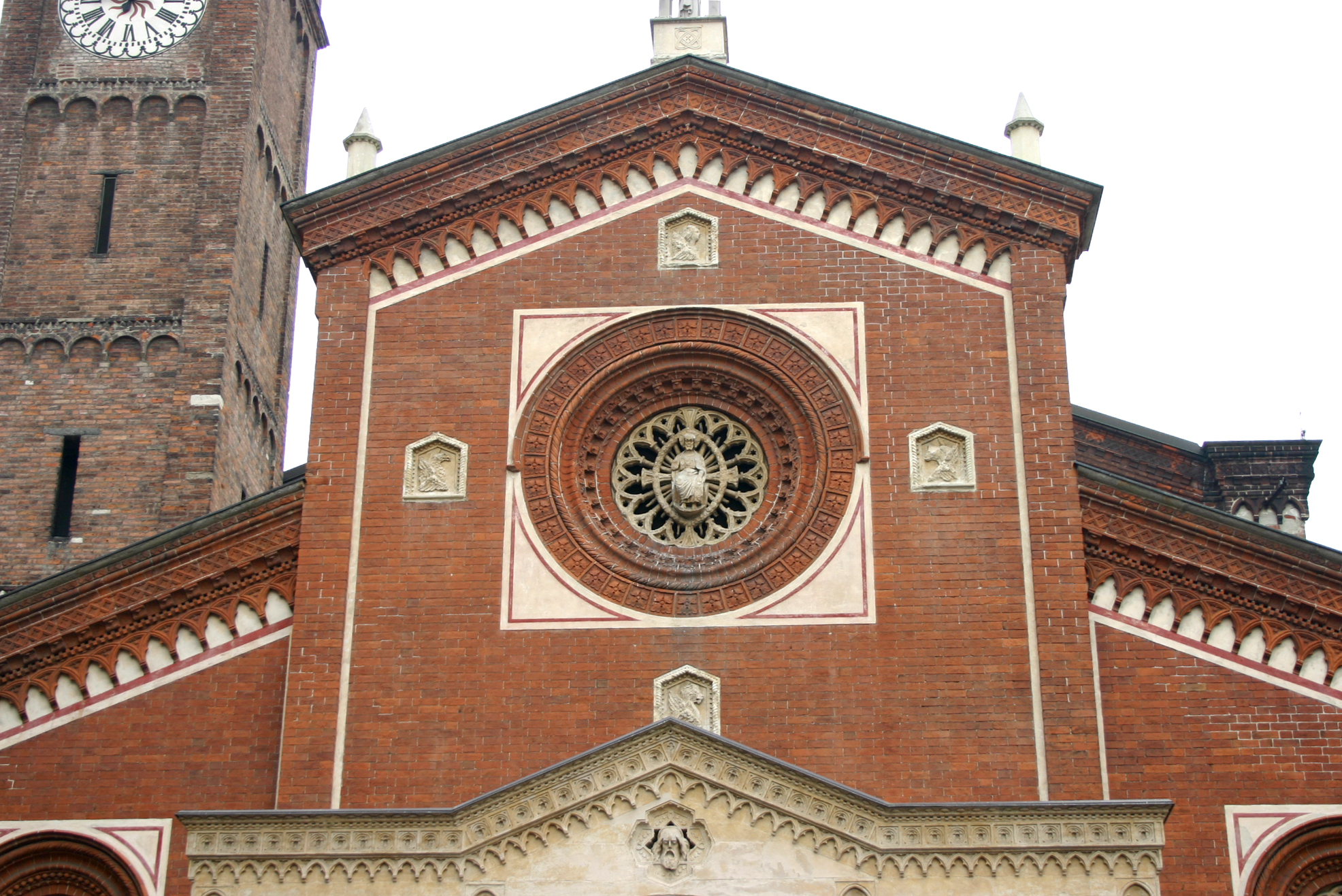
Sant'Eufemia

The church underwent renovation in 1870 by architect Enrico Terzaghi, who designed a neo-romanesque facade of terracotta and Vicenza stone. The rose window above the entrance is surrounded by bas-reliefs with symbols of the four evangelists.

The interior is neo-Gothic; both the walls and vaults are richly decorated with frescoes. The Madonna and Child is by Marco d'Oggiono. Simone Peterzano's Pentecost was originally painted for San Paolo Converso.

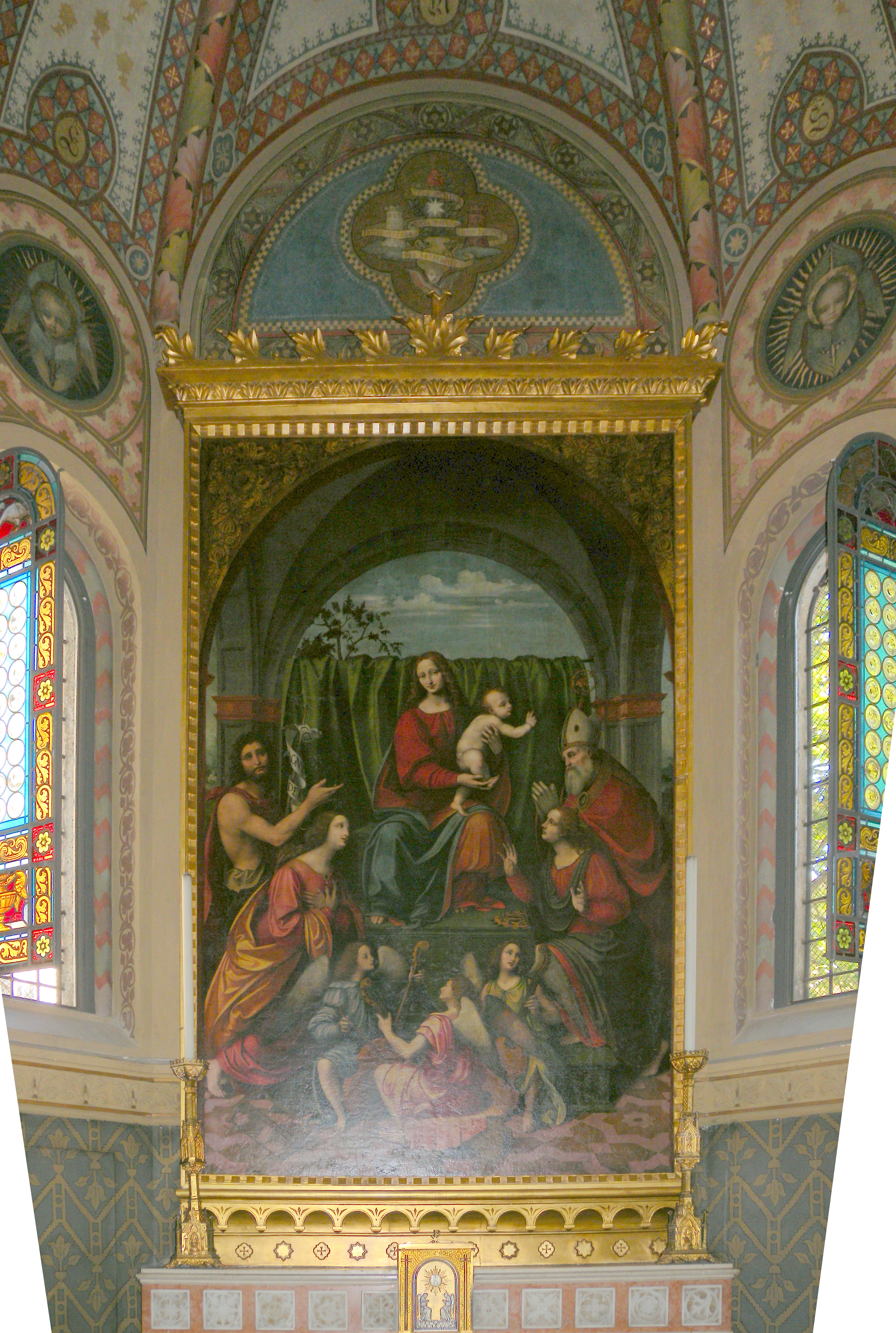
Madonna and Child, Marco d'Oggiono
