= The Preacher Eleazar Swalmius =

Painting by Rembrandt

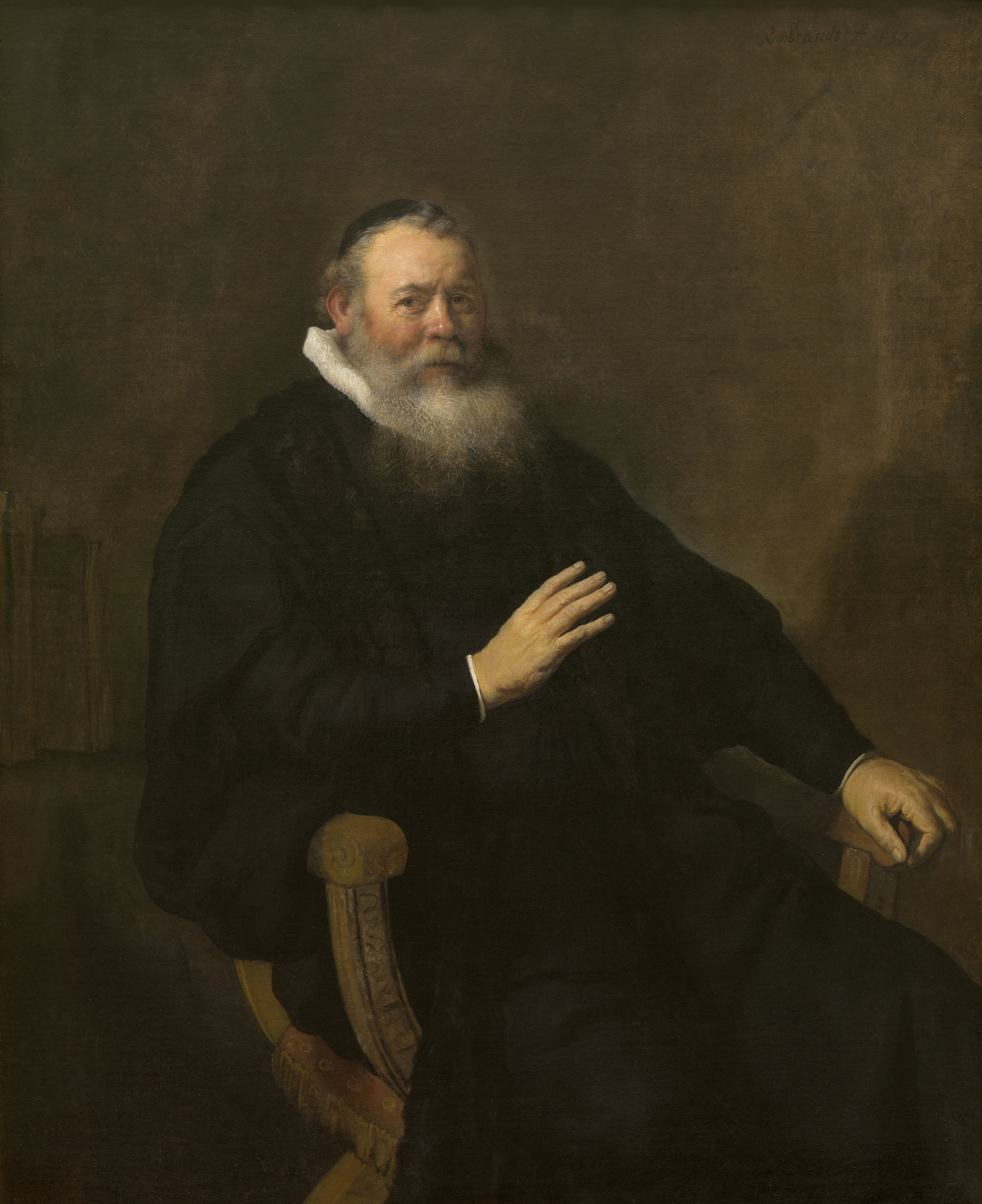
- Artist: Rembrandt
- Year: 1637
- Medium: Oil on canvas
- Dimensions: 132 cm × 109 cm (51 9/6 in × 42.9 in)
- Location: Royal Museum of Fine Arts Antwerp; Antwerp

The Preacher Eleazar Swalmius is a 1637 oil-on-canvas painting by the Dutch artist Rembrandt. It is currently owned by the Royal Museum of Fine Arts in Antwerp. The painting has been certified a real Rembrandt. The painting was listed in 1727 in the catalog of the Duke of Orléans collection, as a portrait of an Amsterdam mayor by Rembrandt. It remained in the noble family's possession until 1792, when Duke Louis-Philippe-Joseph sold the entire collection to finance his political career and pay off debts. The painting passed through several English collections into the hands of the Bourgeois brothers, art dealers from Cologne, who sold the painting as an original Rembrandt to the museum in 1886. The painting was stored away for a long time due to doubts cast over its authenticity.

In the late 2000s, after works of restoration were conducted on the painting, scholars recognized it as an original Rembrandt.

== Subject matter ==
The painting has long been thought to be a portrait of an Amsterdam mayor. It was listed thusly in the collection of the Duke of Orléans at the Palais Royal of Paris in 1727.

However, the painting depicts the preacher Eleazar Swalmius, who was born in Rhoon, but operated in Amsterdam. Rembrandt painted this portrait in 1637, when the pastor was about 55 years old. Swalmius was born in Rhoon to Hendrick van de Swalme, or Henricus Swalmius. Hendrick van de Swalme's family was probably originally from Flanders. His father spent time in England before becoming a preacher in the late 16th century. Like his father, Eleazar became a preacher too (Counter-Remostrant).

Swalmius was active as a pastor in Poortugaal and Hoogvliet near Rotterdam since 1605 and in Schiedam between 1612 and 1622. In 1622 he settled in Amsterdam, where he would live up to his death, and be buried in the Oude Kerk in 1652. The Van der Swalme family must have known Rembrandt well. Carel, a brother of Eleazer and "dike count" (dijkgraaf) of Oranjepolder, for example, witnessed the drawing up of the will of Rembrandt van Rijn and Saskia van Uylenburgh.

== Composition ==
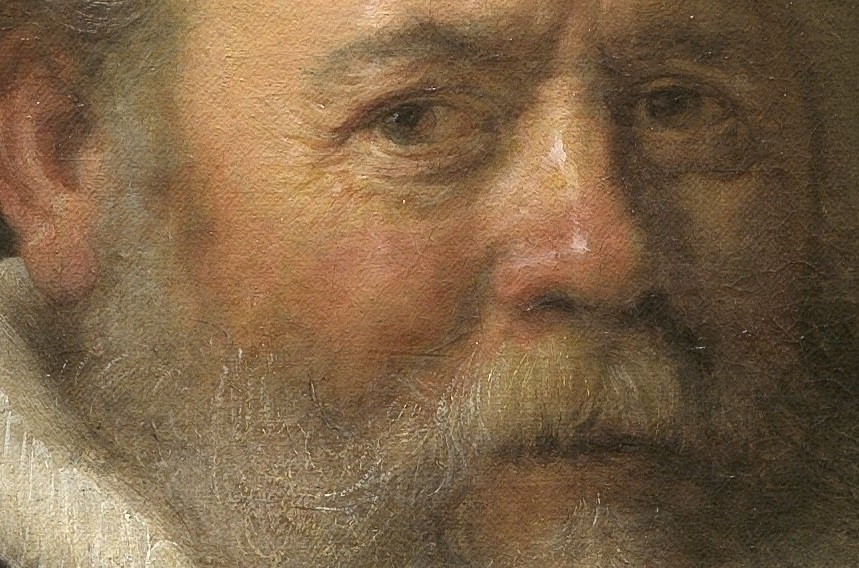
Detail, Swalmius' nose

In the dim brown background, with only a few, barely visible books on a table, the preacher seems to take up an imposing but nonostentatious volume. Rembrandt depicted the Amsterdam preacher almost life-size, in an extremely sober way. He sits relaxed on a low wooden armchair. He was painted three-quarter view. Swalmius doesn't look at the viewer penetratingly. The character's appearance gives the painting a relaxed ambience of confidentiality. His eyes are kind, his nose rubicund. Rather than showing his wisdom, his long white beard enhances the friendliness of his appearance, especially to the modern viewer. There was probably a relationship between the painter and the sitter. As mentioned, Rembrandt knew his client and his family personally.

== Provenance ==
In the eighteenth century, the canvas was located in the Palais Royal in Paris, where the art collection of the Duke of Orléans, brother of Louis XIV, was kept. The painting was recorded in 1727 in the catalog of this collection and described as a portrait of a mayor by Rembrandt. The painting remained in the family's possession until 1792, when Louis Philippe Joseph d'Orléans sold the entire art collection to finance his political career and to pay off his debts.

The painting passed through various English collections into the hands of the Bourgeois art dealers, who sold the work to Antwerp Royal Museum of Fine Arts in 1886, for 200 000 francs. The painting was acquired by the museum as an original Rembrandt.

== Details ==
The painting is signed Rembrandt. f 1637 in the recto's top right corner. The f stands for fecit. As early as 1969, Gerson wrote that the signature did not seem original. Because the painting also seemed "too tame" (tame, not expressive enough) to him, he attributed the work to Rembrandt's pupil Govert Flinck. Curator Jeroen Giltaij wrote that indeed little of Rembrandt's strength was visible in the painting, and that the beard was rather sketchy. However, Giltaij could not say whether it was Flinck who made the work. Upon restoration, the thick yellow layer of varnish turned out to be the main culprit. This layer prevented spectators from appreciating the nuances in the preacher's pink skin tones and black clothes. After the restoration, the Royal Museum of Fine Arts Antwerp invited Rembrandt expert Ernst van de Wetering to study and assess the painting. He was of the opinion that, contrary to what Gerson originally claimed, the painting is a real Rembrandt. This is the accepted conclusion at the moment. Due to doubts over its authenticity, the work was in storage for a long time. After confirmation by Van de Wetering, the KMSKA decided that the work was to be given a permanent spot in the museum's collection upon the reopening of the former.

== See also ==
- List of paintings by Rembrandt

== Notes ==
=== General references ===
- "The preacher Eleazar Swalmius". Flemish Art Collection.
- Ackley, Clifford S. Rembrandt's Journey: Painter•Draftsman•Etcher. Boston, Museum of Fine Arts, 2003. ISBN 0-87846-677-0
- A. Bredius, Rembrandt: The Complete Edition of the Paintings, revised by H. Gerson, Londen, 1969, cat. nr. 213.
- J. Bruyn, B. Haak, SH Levie, PJJ van Thiel, E. van de Wetering, A Corpus of Rembrandt Paintings, III, Dordrecht, 1989, p. 689.
- Ernst van de Wetering, A Corpus of Rembrandt Paintings VI. Rembrandt's Paintings Revisited, A complete survey, Dordrecht, 2015, cat nr. 156, p. 560.
- AJJ Delen, in the Royal Museum of Fine Arts - Antwerp. Descriptive Catalog. I. Old Masters, 1948, p. 220.
- Jan Lea Broeckx inMuseums of Belgium. Royal Museum of Fine Arts in Antwerp. Old Masters, 1959, No. 44 and 1969 No. 54.
- André A. Moerman, inPublic Art Property Flanders 1963, p. 6-b.
- Smith, Catal. Reasoned, VII, nr. 274, bl. 102.
- Jeroen Giltaij, Lecture and notes on the paintings of Rembrandt and school in the Museum of Fine Arts of Antwerp, 2006.
- J. Couché, “Engraver du Cabinet” of the Duke of Orleans, Paris, J. Couché and J. Bouilard, MDCCLXXXVI. Described in the rare work: “Galerie du Palais * * Royal”, text by Abbé de Fontenai, engravings by; engraved therein as “Portrait d'un Bourgmestre”. by Malherbe and H. Guttemberg; Size given there: H. 4 v. 5 d., B. 3 v. 4 d. Cloth. De Fontenai calls this “un des chefs d'oeuvre de Rembrandt”.
- Royal Museum of Fine Arts. Descriptive Catalog. I. Old Masters, 1905, p. 249-250.
- Wenke Mast, Highlights, Website K.M.S.K.A., 2011.
