= Eusebius (bishop of Milan) =

Archbishop of Milan from 449 to 462

- Archbishop of Milan
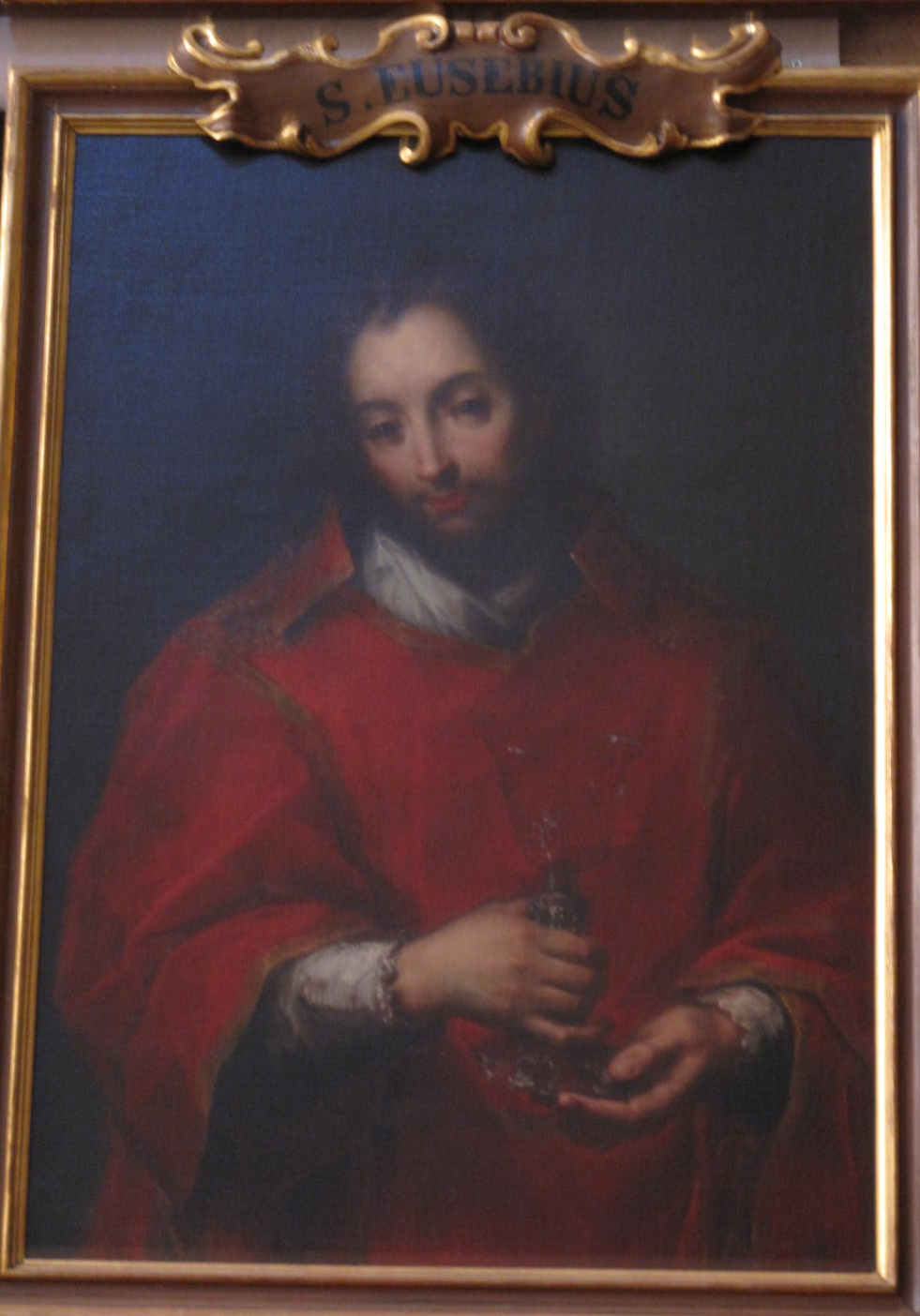
- 18th-century painting of Saint Eusebius
- Appointed: 449 AD
- Term ended: 462
- Predecessor: Lazarus
- Successor: Gerontius

Personal details
- Died: 8 August 462

Sainthood
- Feast day: 12 August
- Venerated in: Catholic Church, Orthodox Church

Eusebius (Italian: Eusebio) was Archbishop of Milan from 449 to 462. He is honoured as a saint and his feast day is 12 August.

== Life ==
According to the writings of Ennodius, bishop of Pavia in early 6th-century, Eusebius was Greek. He probably participated, as bishop of Milan, to a synod held in Rome in 449 which condemned the doctrines of Eutyches, deemed to be heretic. Surely Eusebius was the addressee of a letter written by Pope Leo the Great and carried to Milan in 451 by Abundius bishop of Como and Senator, who were returning to North Italy from Constantinople. In 451 Eusebius convened a Provincial Council in Milan, attended by eighteen bishops, where the Tome of Leo was read and approved, and consequently the doctrines of Eutyches were condemned.

The main political event in Eusebius' episcopate was the 452 invasion of Italy by the Huns led by Attila. The Huns razed Aquileia and then moved East and sacked numerous cities such as Padua. They entered also in Milan where Attila occupied the imperial palace and set fire to a large part of the town, destroying also the cathedral of Saint Tecla. Eusebius, along with many citizens, fled from the Huns and left the town. They returned in Milan only when Attila was convinced by Pope Leo to retire. Eusebius led the reconstruction of the town, including the cathedral which was re-consecrated in 453 by Maximus II bishop of Turin (not to be confused with Saint Maximus of Turin) who for the occasion spoke the homily De reparatione ecclesiae mediolanensis.

Eusebius died on 8 August, probably in 462, and his remains were interred in the city's basilica of St. Lorenzo Maggiore. His feast is celebrated on 12 August. A late tradition, with no historical basis, associates Eusebius with the Milan's family of the Pagani.
