= Hendrik Swalmius =

Dutch theologian

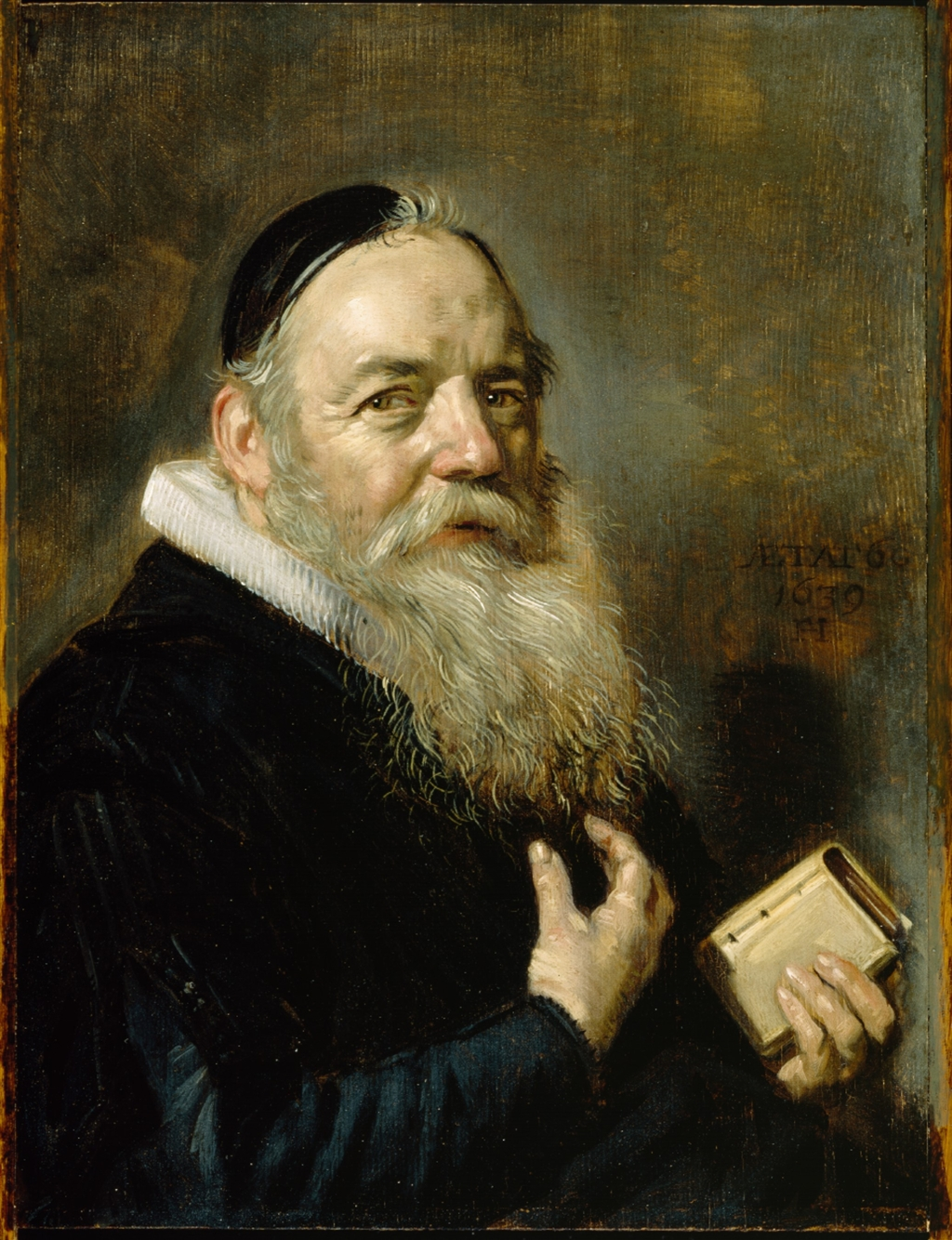
Portrait of Hendrik Swalmius, 1639, collection Detroit Institute of Arts

Hendrik Swalmius (1577 – 1649), was a Dutch theologian known today for his portrait by Frans Hals.

== Biography ==
He was born in Rhoon as the son of Hendrick van de Swalme, or Henricus Swalmius, who was probably born in Flanders and spent time in England before becoming preacher in Rhoon in 1580. It was in Rhoon that he changed his name from Swalme to Swalmius. Swalmius the Elder had 4 sons:

1. Arnoldus, who became a preacher in Westmaas, 's Gravesande
2. Hendrik the younger, this Hendrik who married Judith van Breda in 1600 and became preacher of Oud-Alblas and later of the Grote Kerk, Haarlem in 1625
3. Carel (1587-1640) who became a dike-reeve in IJzendijke
4. Eleazar (1582-1652), who became a preacher in Amsterdam and was portrayed by Rembrandt (or someone in his studio).

In 1650 an engraving based on the Hals portrait of Hendrick was made by Suyderhoef stating he was a preacher in Rhoon.

After his wife died he remarried in Haarlem in 1640 to Ifje Willems van Weert. He died in Haarlem in 1649.

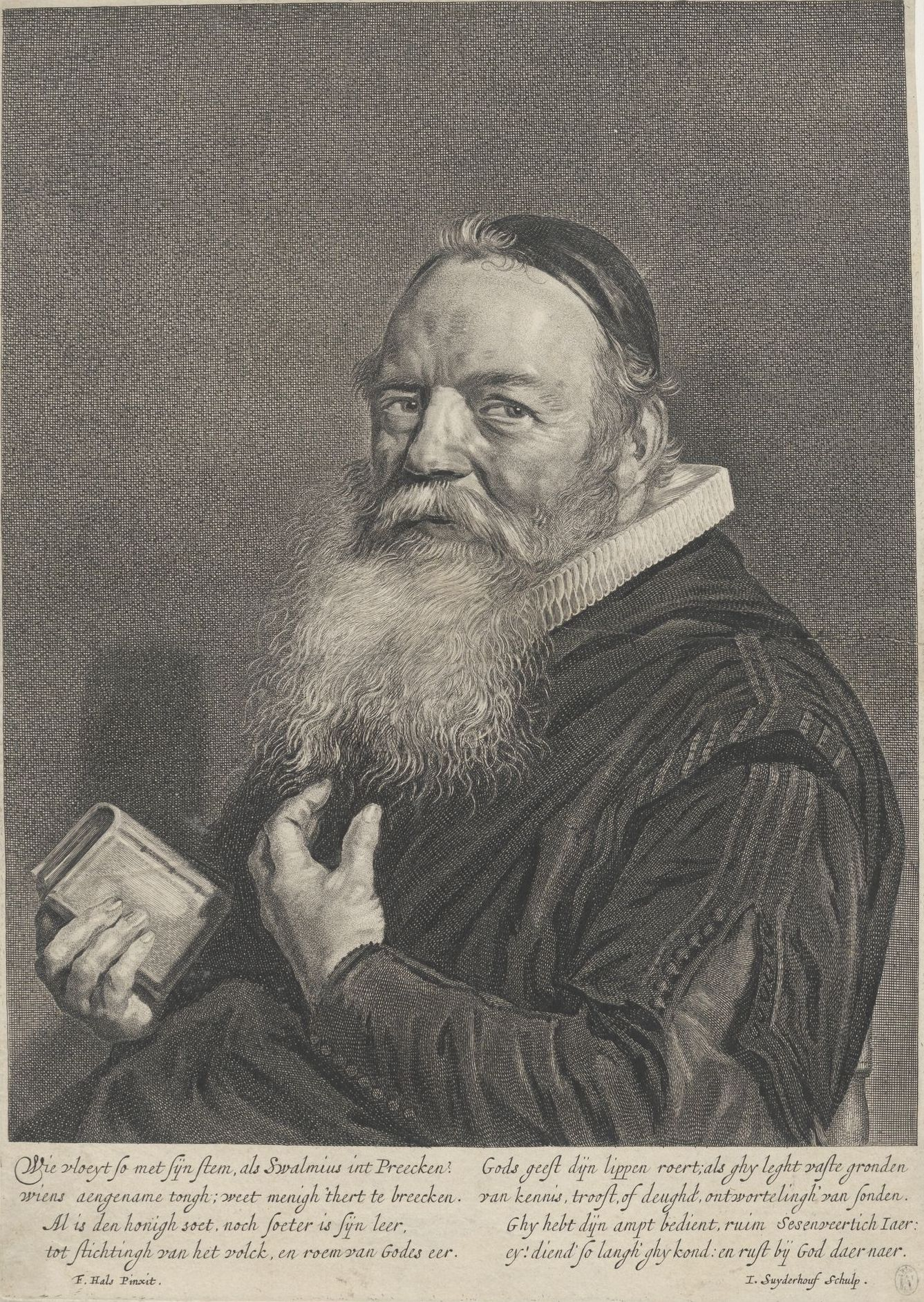
Engraved portrait by Jonas Suyderhoef, c.1650

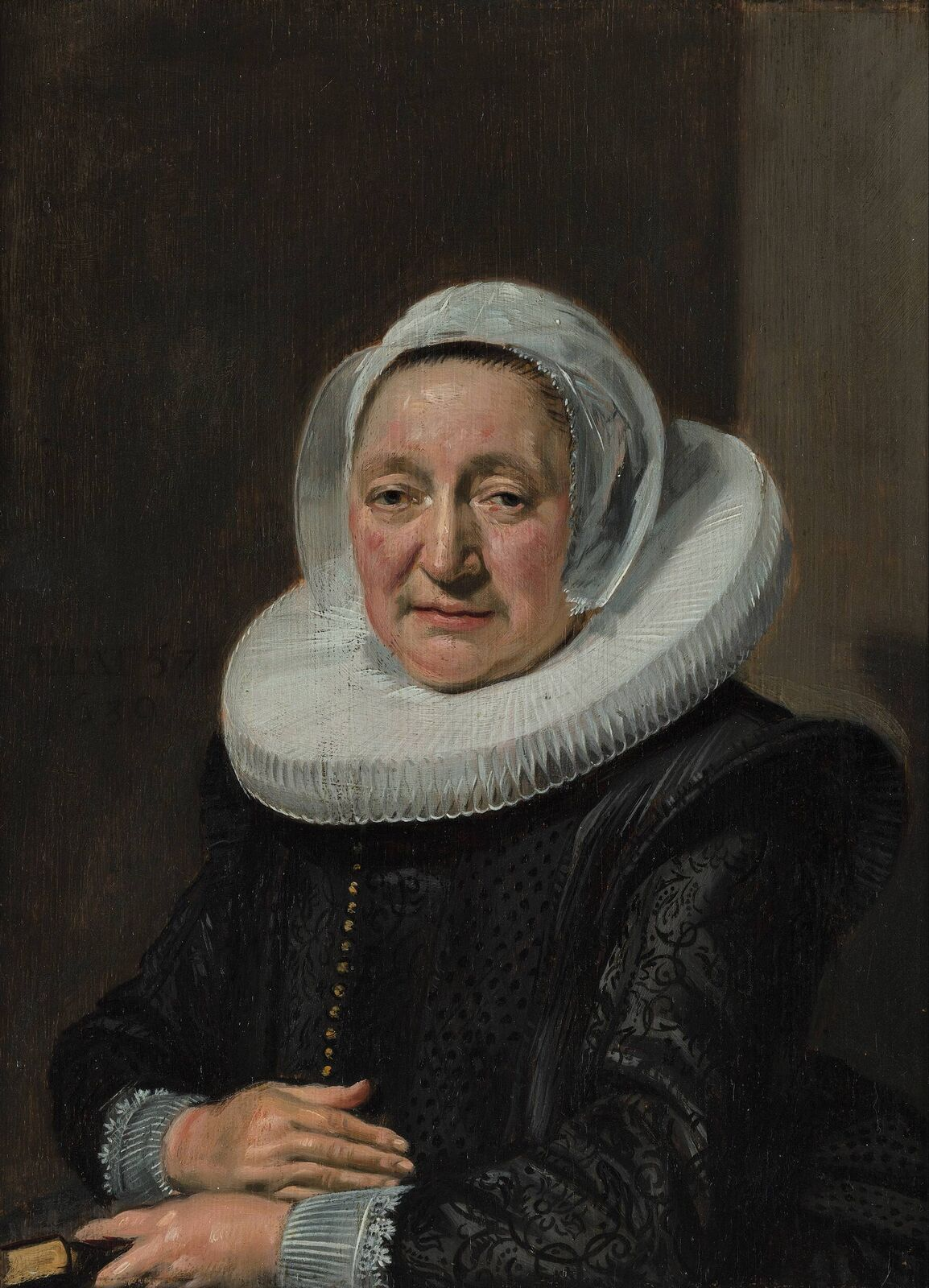
His wife Judith van Breda (1582-1640) or his second wife IJfje Willems van Weert (?), pendant to her husband's portrait, collection Museum Boijmans Van Beuningen

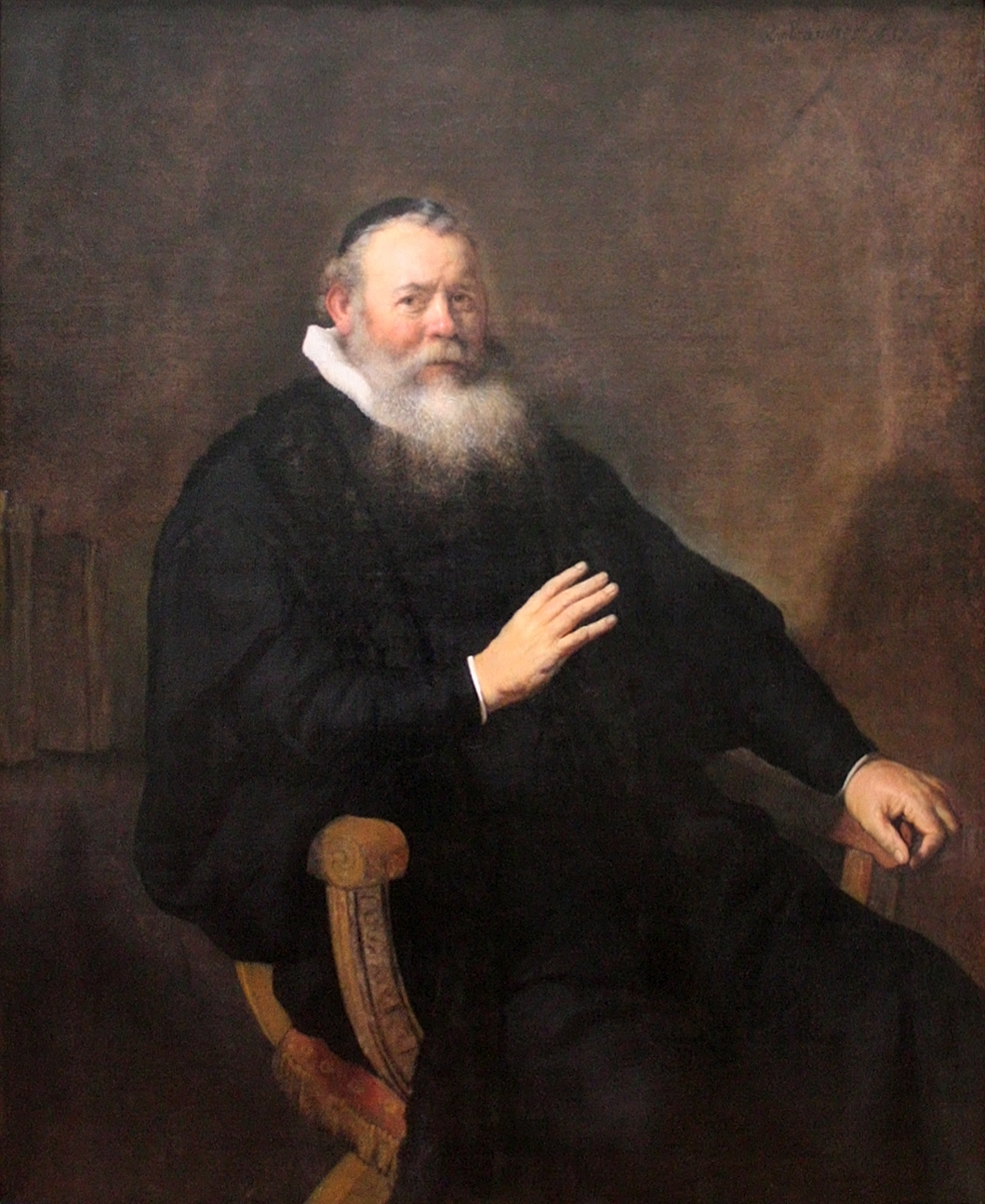
His brother Eleazar, formerly attributed to Rembrandt, collection Royal Museum of Fine Arts Antwerp
