= Senator (bishop of Milan) =

Bishop of Milan from 472 to 475

Senator of Settala
- Archbishop of Milan
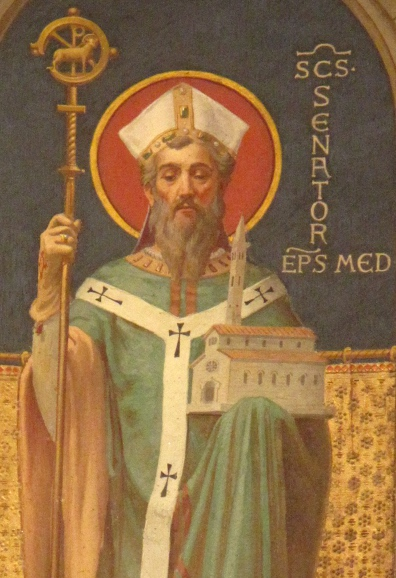
- Church: Eastern Orthodox Church; Roman Catholic Church
- Appointed: 472 AD
- Term ended: 29 May 475
- Predecessor: Benignus
- Successor: Theodorus I

Personal details
- Died: 29 May 475

Sainthood
- Feast day: 28 May
- Venerated in: aforementioned Churches
- Shrines: Basilica of Saint Euphemia and Saint Senator

Senator of Milan or Senator of Settala (Italian: Senatore di Settala) was Bishop of Milan from 472 to 475. He is honoured as a saint in the Eastern Orthodox Church and Catholic Church and his feast day is 28 May.

== Life ==
The main primary source for the life of Senator are the writings of Ennodius, bishop of Pavia in early 6th-century, who describes Senator as a man of great eloquence and wit, and attributes to him commentaries to the Prophets.

Senator was born in Settala, about 15 km east of Milan. His ecclesiastical career was immediately linked to his spiritual guide, Saint Abundius bishop of Como. In summer 450 Senator, still a priest, was part of a deputation led by Abundius that took some letters of Pope Leo the Great to Constantinople. These letters, dated 17 June 450, were addressed to the Emperor Theodosius II, to the Empress Pulcheria and to the Patriarch of Constantinople Anatolius, and were issued to denounce their support to the doctrines of Eutyches, deemed to be heretic.

The deputation returned to Rome before June 451, and Abundius and Senator returned to Milan with papal letters to the Bishop of Milan Eusebius. In September 451 Abundius and Senator assisted to a local synod in Milan, attended by 18 bishops from all over northern Italy, where they gave an account of their journey to the East. The next month, the doctrines of Eutyches were formally condemned by the Council of Chalcedon.

Senator became bishop of Milan in 472. As bishop he was actively involved in spiritual and material care of the diocese. In 472 Senator founded the Basilica of Saint Euphemia in Milan, which he dedicated to the martyr Euphemia, and that today is dedicate to both Saint Euphemia and him. In fact Euphemia was strictly connected to the condemnation of the Eutychian doctrine, because the Council of Chalcedon was held in a church dedicated to her and a miracle by her caused the condemnation.

Senator died on 29 May 475 and he was buried in the basilica he founded. His feast day is celebrated in the Catholic Church on 28 May because 29 May was already occupied with another memory of saints.
