= Simone Peterzano =

Italian painter

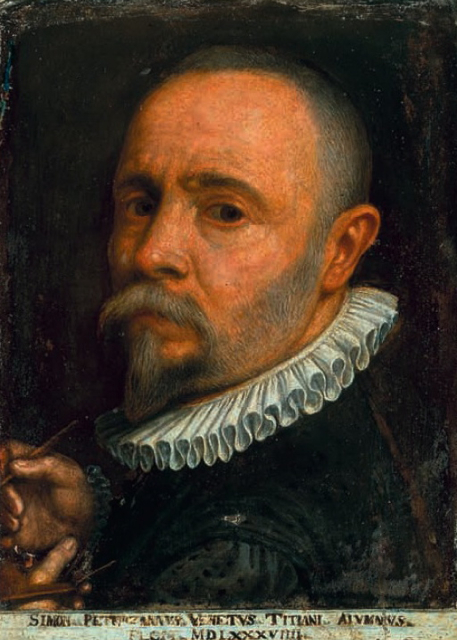
- Self-portrait, 1589, Accademia Carrara, Bergamo
- Born: c. 1535; Venice, Republic of Venice
- Died: c. 1599; Milan, Duchy of Milan
- Education: Titian
- Known for: Painting

Simone Peterzano (c. 1535 – c. 1599) was an Italian Mannerist painter. Born in Bergamo, he stressed his links to Venice where he probably trained. He is mostly known as the teacher of Caravaggio.

== Life ==
Peterzano called himself a pupil of Titian and would sometimes sign his works Titiani alumnus. He debuted in Milan with the counterfaçade frescoes in San Maurizio al Monastero Maggiore (1573), influenced by Veronese and Tintoretto. In the same year he painted two canvasses with Histories of St. Paul and St. Barnabas for the church of San Barnaba, also in Milan. Also from the same period are a Pietà in the church of San Fedele and a Pentecost for San Paolo Converso (now in Sant'Eufemia).

Between 1578 and 1582 Peterzano executed frescoes in the presbytery of Garegnano Charterhouse, considered one of his masterworks. In the same period he painted a Nativity with saints and angels in the church of Santa Maria di Canepanova in Pavia. In 1589 Peterzano is recorded in Milan, when he took part in the competition for the cathedral organ doors, a commission won by himself and Camillo Procaccini.

His cycle of frescoes depicting scenes from the Life of St. Anthony of Padua (Sant'Angelo, Milan), painted after 1591, accentuated the interest in narrative already evident at Garegnano, and this was developed with greater monumentalism in his frescoes of biblical stories in the Monastero Maggiore, Milan, which are indebted to the colossal art of Giovanni Ambrogio Figino and Giuseppe Meda. His altarpiece depicting St. Ambrose between St. Gervase and St. Protase (1592; Milan, Pinacoteca Ambrosiana) exemplifies the clarity and directness of his late art, which fulfilled the propaganda demands of the reformed Milanese church, led by Charles and Federico Borromeo.

== Gallery ==
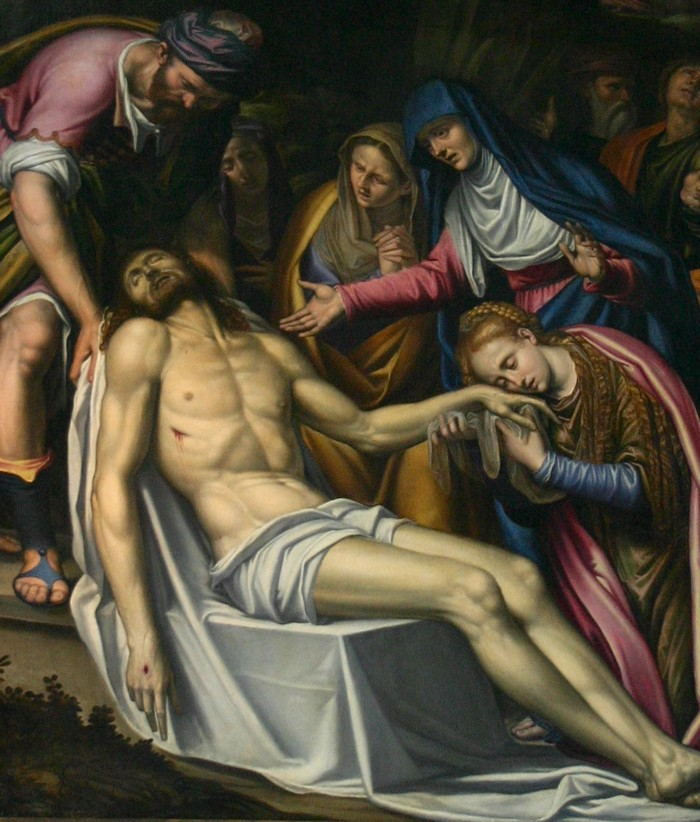
Deposition of Christ, church of San Fedele, Milan

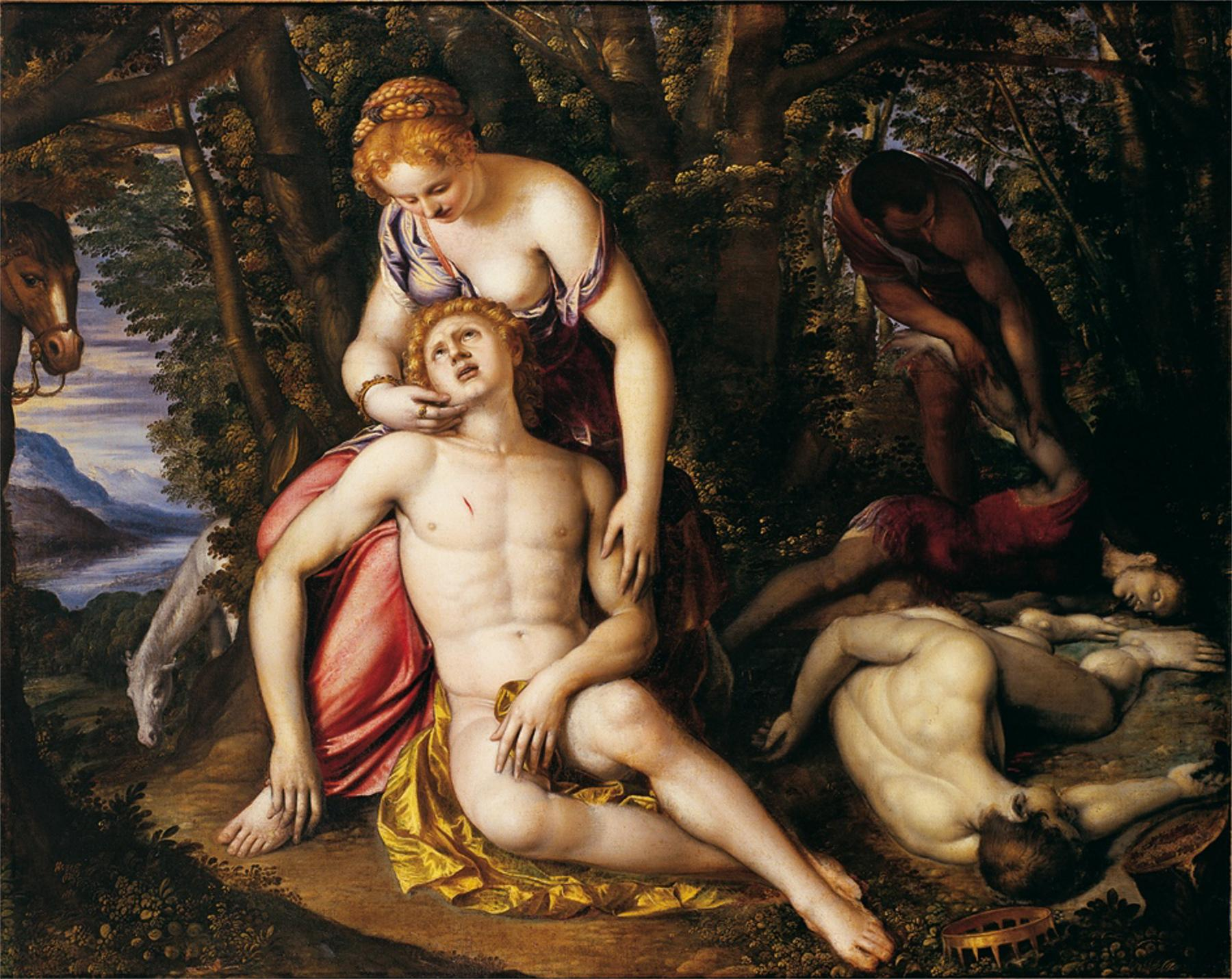
Angelica and Medoro, priv. col.

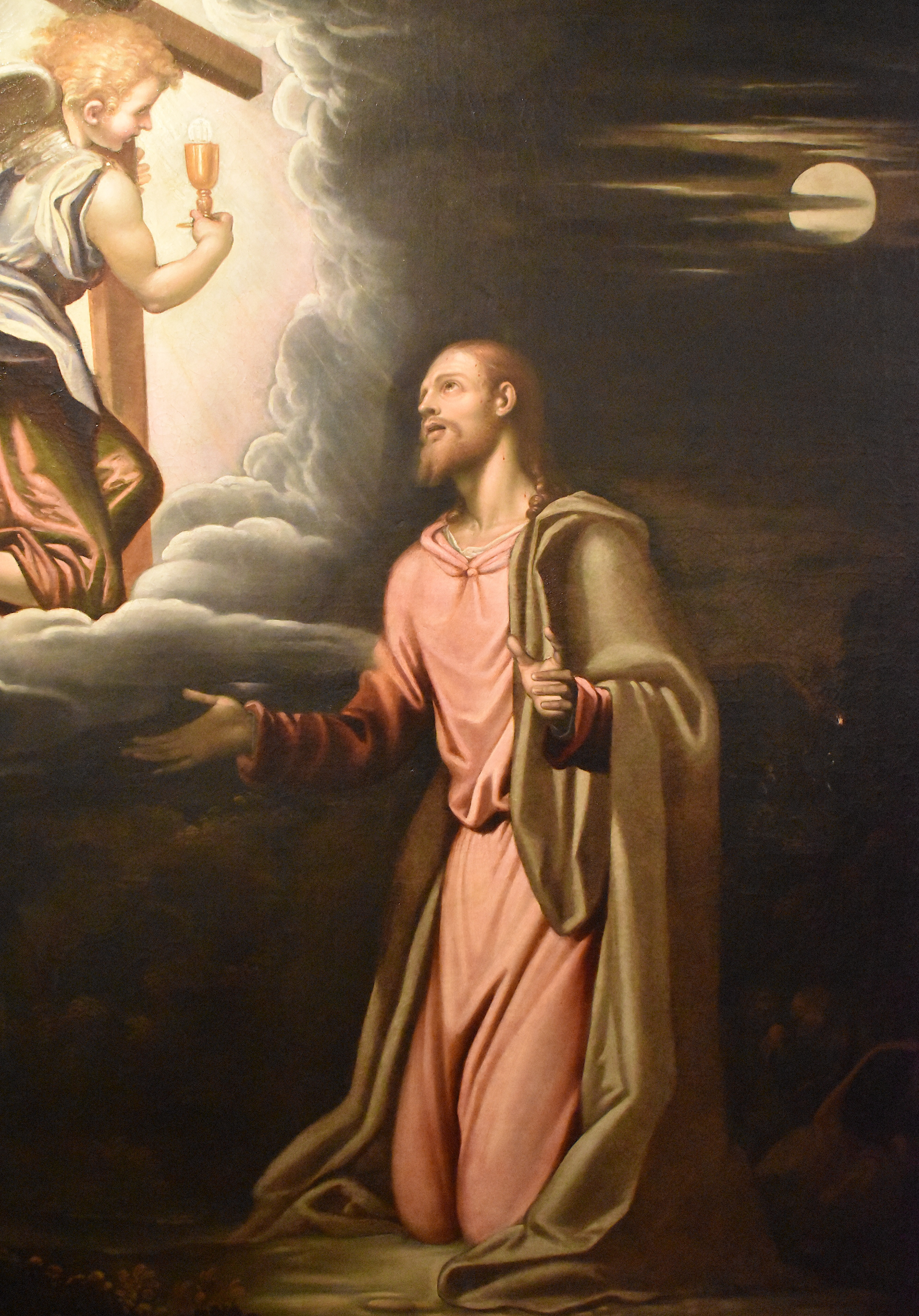
The Agony in the Garden, Diocesan Museum of Milan

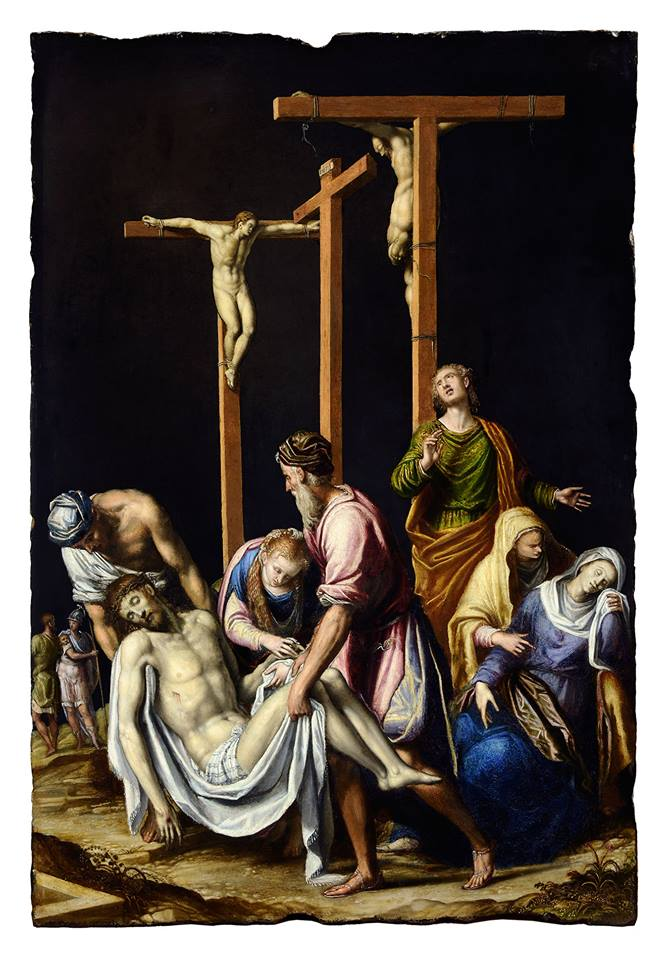
The Deposition of Christ, Musée des Beaux-Arts de Strasbourg

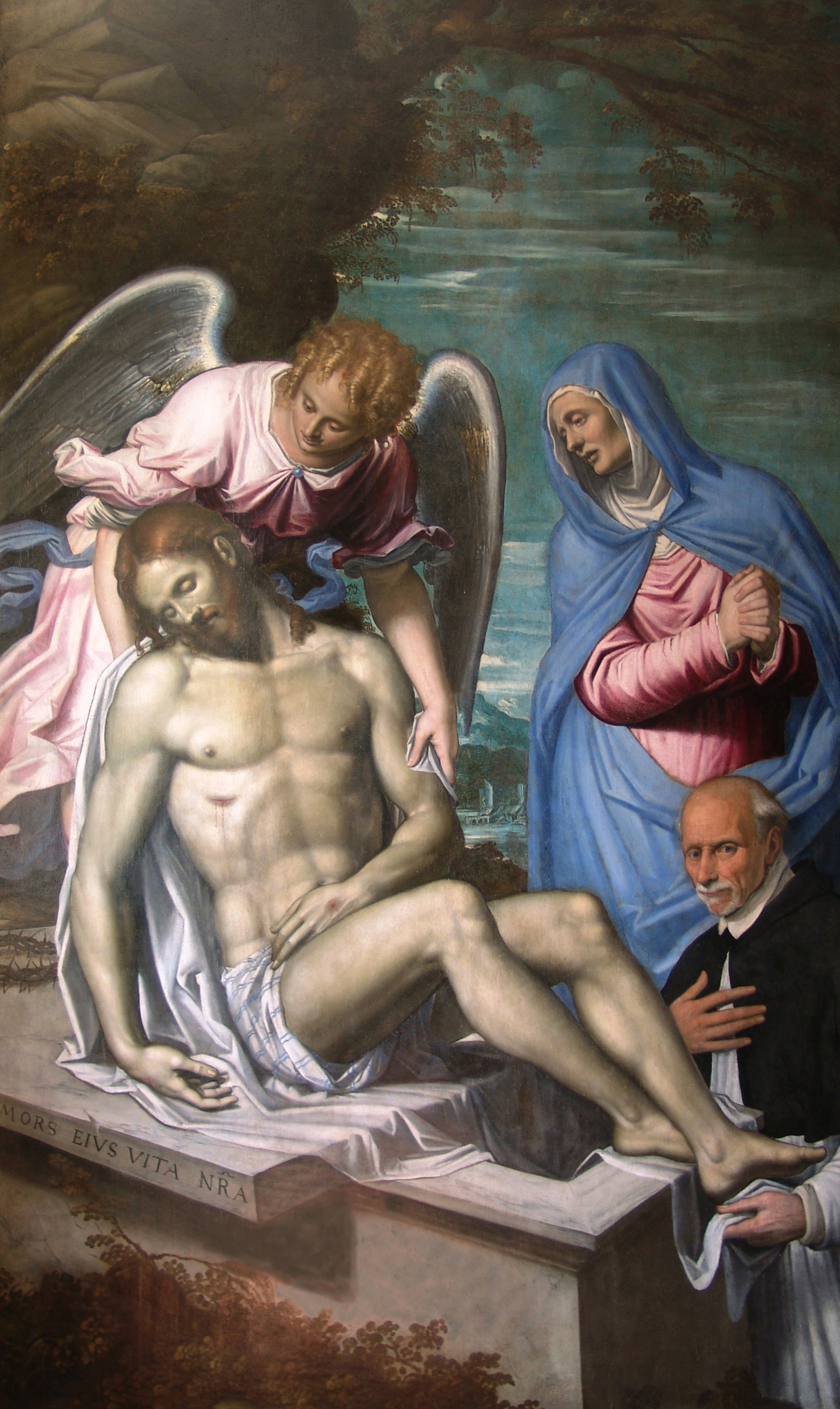
The Deposition of Christ Saint George Church, Bernate Ticino

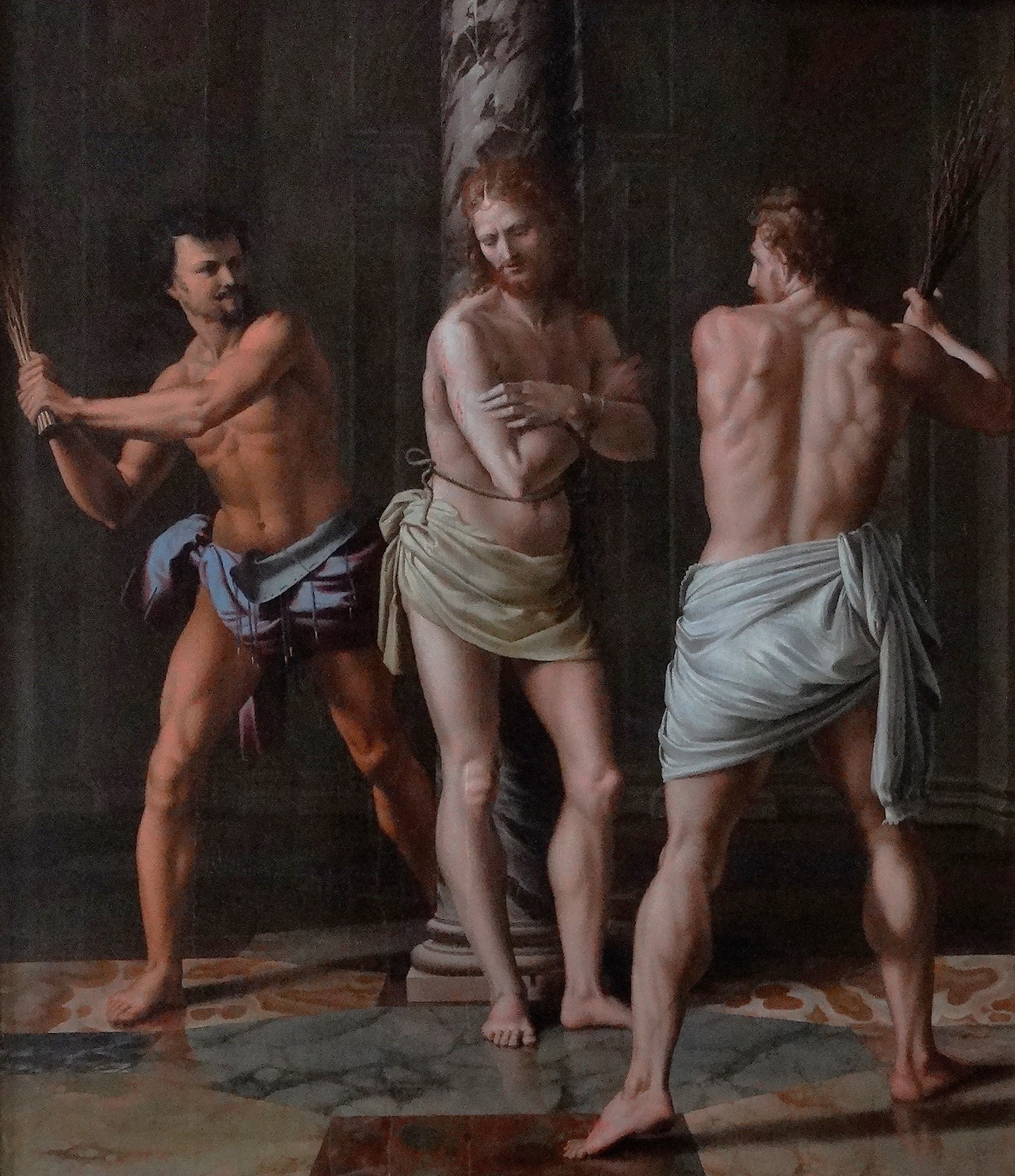
The Flagellation of Christ, Santa Prassede, Rome

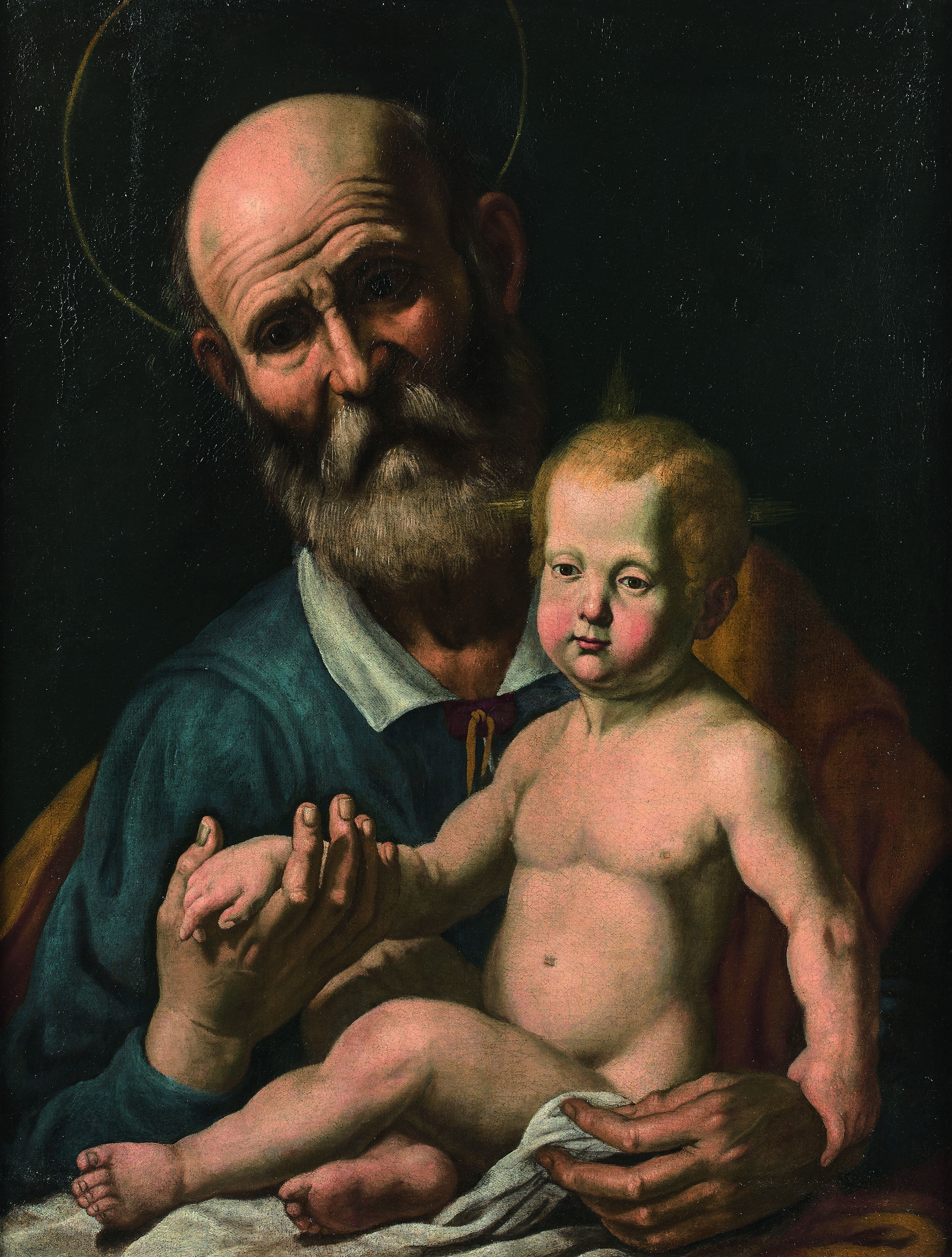
St. Joseph and the Child Jesus, priv. col.

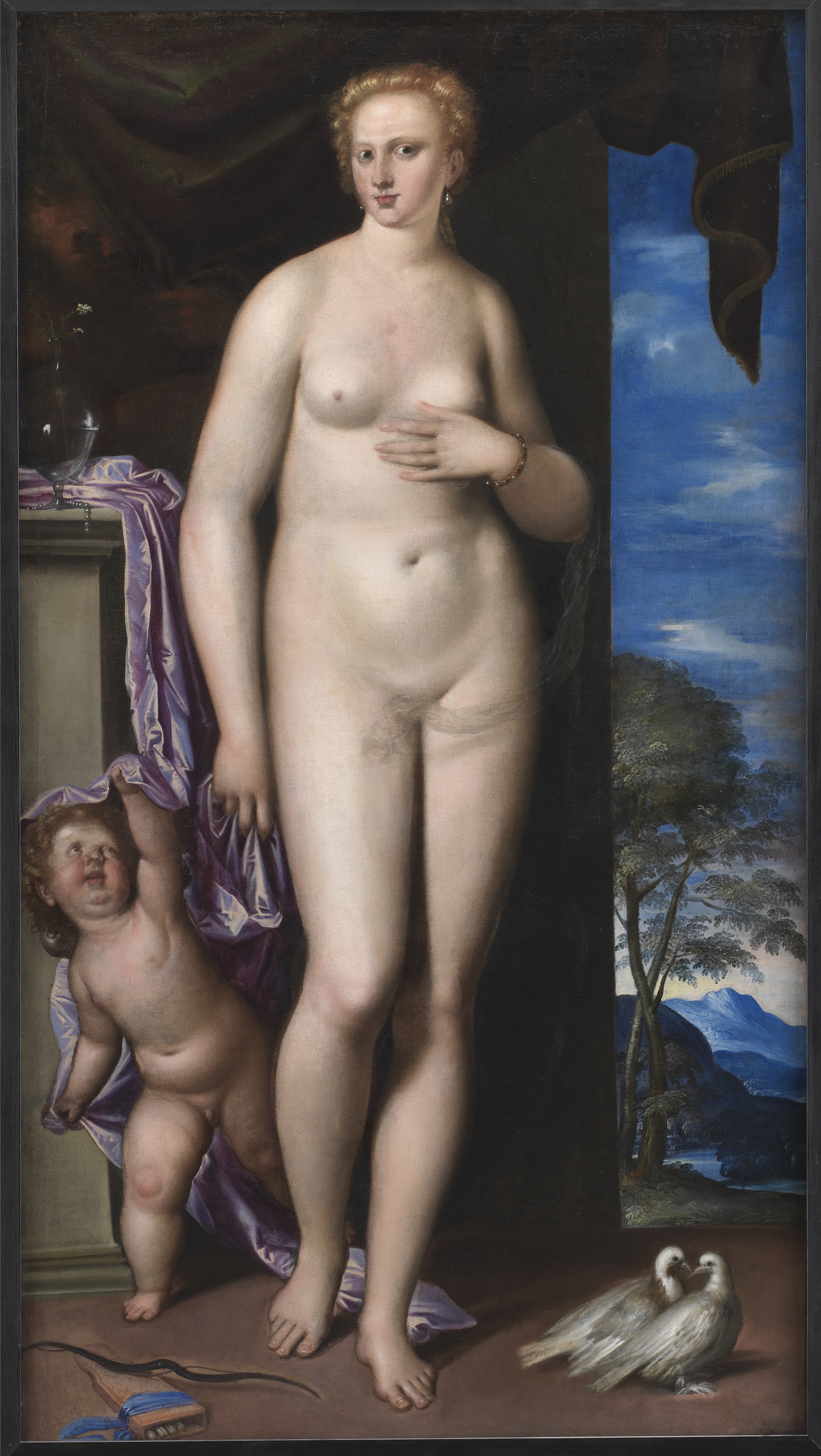
Venus and Cupid, National Gallery of Denmark, Copenhagen

== Sources ==
- Gregori, Mina (1992). "Sul venetismo di Simone Peterzano". Arte Documento (6): 263–269.
- Graham-Dixon, Andrew (2011). Caravaggio: A Life Sacred and Profane. London: Penguin Books. p. 14. ISBN 978-0241954645.
- Terzaghi, Maria Cristina (2015). "PETERZANO, Simone". Dizionario Biografico degli Italiani (in Italian). Vol. 82: Pazzi–Pia. Rome: Istituto dell'Enciclopedia Italiana. ISBN 978-88-12-00032-6.
