= Benignus (bishop of Milan) =

Archbishop of Milan from 465 to 472

- Archbishop of Milan
- Church: Catholic Church
- Appointed: 465 AD
- Term ended: 472
- Predecessor: Gerontius
- Successor: Senator

Personal details
- Died: 472

Sainthood
- Feast day: September 20
- Venerated in: Roman Catholicism; Eastern Orthodoxy; Lutheranism; Anglicanism

Benignus (Italian: Benigno) was Archbishop of Milan from 465 to 472. He is honoured as a Saint in the Catholic Church and his feast day is September 20.

== Life ==
Almost nothing is known about the life and the episcopate of Benignus. He was probably born to a noble family of Milan and he studied in Rome. He was elected bishop of Milan in 465, and he participated to a council which is identified by scholars as the Roman synod of November 19, 465, held in the Basilica di Santa Maria Maggiore under the presidency of Pope Hilarius.

In 466 Benignus probably consecrated the elected bishop Epiphanius of Pavia, and he had a part in the attempts to settle the dispute between Anthemius and the barbarian leader Ricimer.

Benignus died in 472, but sources are not unanimous on the exact day, suggesting the 22 November or 27 November, or even June of the same year. His feast is celebrated the 20 November. Benignus was buried in the city's Basilica of St. Simplician. A late tradition, supported only by a signet presumably found in 1582 in the urn containing his remains, associates Benignus with the Milan's family of the Bossi.
