= Gerontius (bishop of Milan) =

Archbishop of Milan from 462 to 465

- Archbishop of Milan
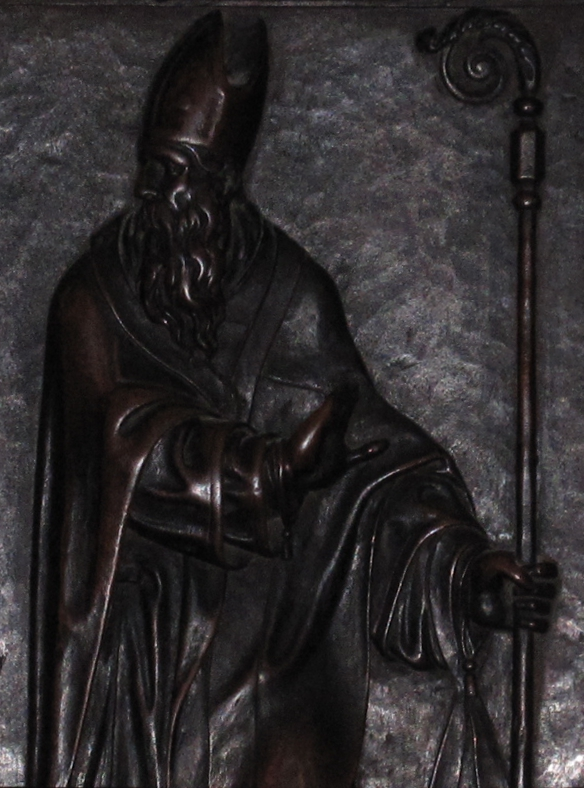
- Church: Catholic Church
- Appointed: 462 AD
- Term ended: 5 May 465
- Predecessor: Eusebius
- Successor: Benignus

Personal details
- Died: 5 May 465

Sainthood
- Feast day: 5 May
- Venerated in: Catholic Church

Gerontius (Italian: Geronzio, died 5 May 465) was Archbishop of Milan from 462 to 465. He is honoured as a Saint in the Catholic Church and his feast day is 5 May.

== Life ==
Almost nothing is known about the life and the episcopate of Gerontius. He was a pupil of the previous bishop Eusebius who suggested his name as his successor. Thus Gerontius was elected bishop of Milan in about 462.

According to the writings of Ennodius, bishop of Pavia in early 6th-century, Gerontius was distinguished for his generosity and charity during the difficult years of reconstruction after the devastating invasion of the Huns occurred in 452. Gerontius during his episcopate went on rebuilding many secondary churches destroyed by the Huns.

Gerontius died on 5 May 465 and his remains were interred in the city's Basilica of St. Simplician. His feast is celebrated on his death date. A late tradition, with no historical basis, associates Gerontius with the Milanese family of Bascapé.
