= Eleazar (painter) =

Spanish artist

- Born: 1954 (age 70–71); Siles, Jaén, Spain
- Known for: painting
- Website: eleazar.es

Eleazar is a Spanish painter and sculptor who was born in Siles, Jaén, Spain in 1954. He lives and works in Barcelona, the city where he has had his workshop since 1979.

== Early life ==
Eleazar was born in 1954 the Spanish town of Siles in the province of Jaén, Andalusia; he has lived in Barcelona since his youth.

== Work ==
Eleazar often works in series of several related works. His influences include graffiti, Art Brut artist Jean Dubuffet and the interpretations of African masks by Picasso. His sculpture, The Employee of the Year, is an homage to Dubuffet. According to the linguist Ángel Gómez Moreno, other influences include children's drawings and comics, as well as Francisco Goya's engravings. Moreno describes Eleazar's paintings as having the flat space medieval art.

His work deploys irony and "critical satire" to make visual statements about cultural myths and social issues. Formally, his paintings involve a mixture of collage, graffiti-like brush work, and include the use of charcoal, written words, incisions and other mixed-media techniques. Some of the figures in his paintings represent politicians, acquaintances and family members, while others depict "archetypal prototypes" of pre-industrial rural Spain where Eleazar lived in his childhood." The figures are rendered in an angular style, the shapes delineated with strong black outlines giving them a graphic quality. These have been compared to Sumerian figurines as well as to carved wooden sculptures or marionettes.

He has shown his work in several exhibitions throughout Spain and in other countries. One series of his work is a tribute to the female characters in the novel Don Quixote.

After his exhibition, Eleazar's Tour 2010-2011 was withdrawn from public display by the Provincial Council of Malaga for "attacking the dignity of politicians" and for "denigrating women". The artist's gallerist criticized the censorship of the traveling exhibition, claiming that the works were removed "without notifying either me or the artist". Eleazar stated that he felt that the politicians who censored his work were confusing the message (of the paintings) with the messenger. An example of this socio-political work is the painting, Político intachable busca partido sin escrúpulos (Unimpeachable politician seeks unscrupulous party), that represents businessmen, politicians and other officials who have been accused of corrupt activities.

The following show by the artist, From the Austrias to Spain is Different, parodied the work of Spanish master-artist Diego Velázquez, such as The Triumph of Bacchus.

== Gallery ==
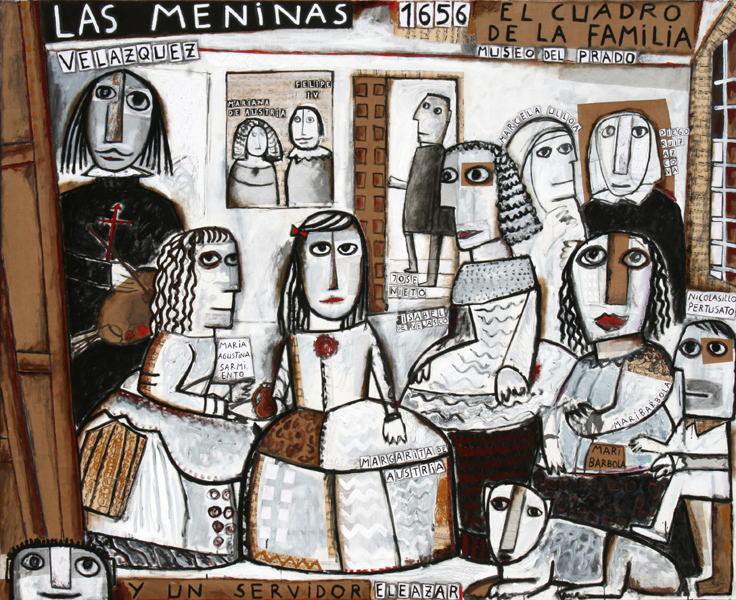
Las Meninas y un servidor. 220x180

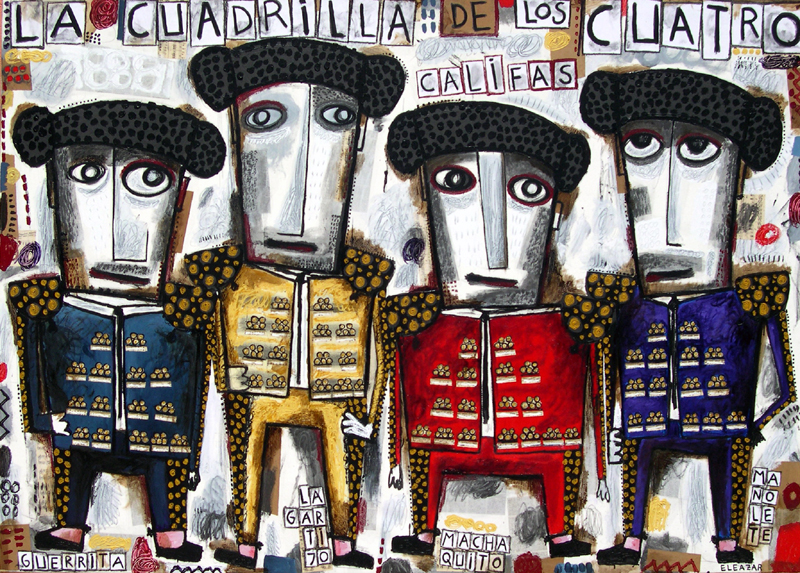
The group of the four Caliphs. 210x150

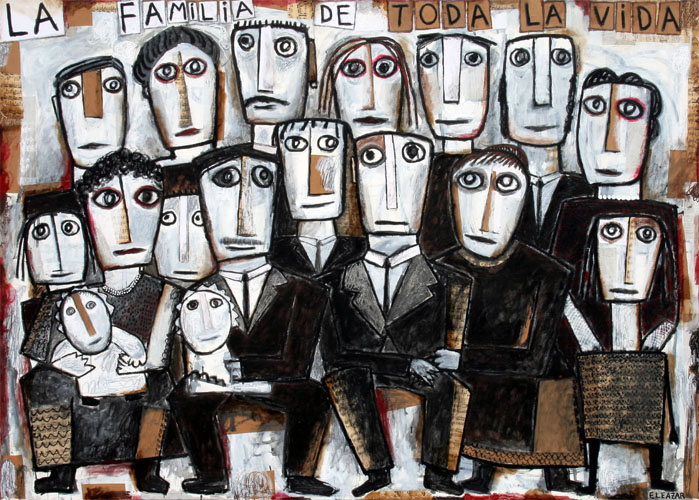
The Family. 210x150

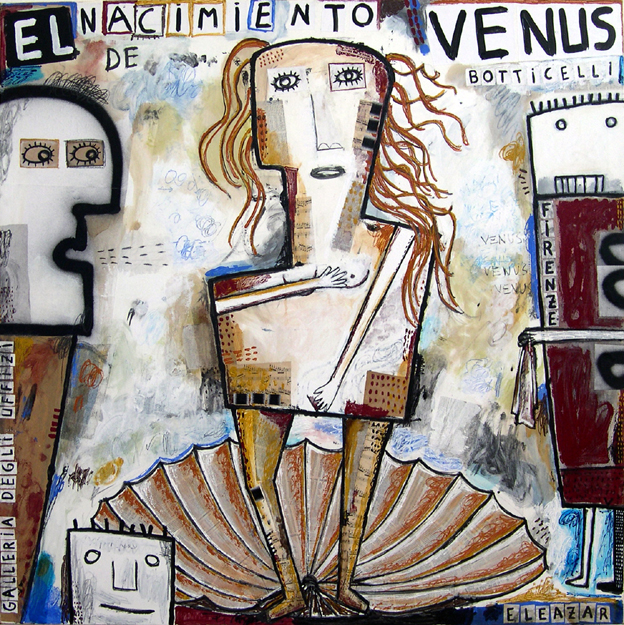
The Birth of Venus. 150x150.

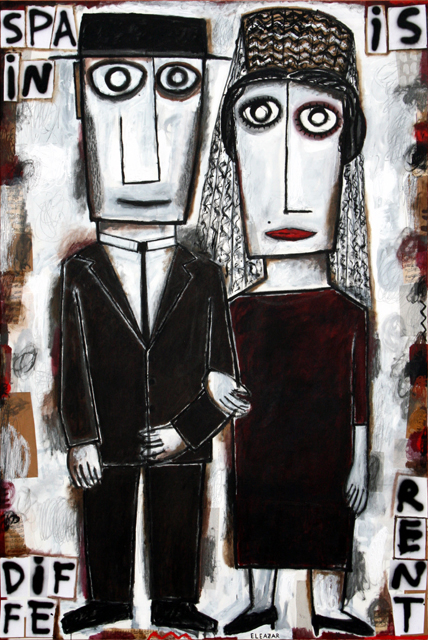
Spain is Different. 240x160
