= Eliezer Adler =

- Born: 30 August 1866; Stanisławów, Galicia, Austria-Hungary (now Ivano-Frankivsk, Ukraine)
- Died: 16 January 1949 (aged 82)
- Resting place: Rainsough Jewish Cemetery, Greater Manchester, England
- Occupations: Watchmaker and jeweller; Jewish communal leader
- Known for: Early leadership of the Orthodox Jewish community in Gateshead
- Spouse: Sarah Rosenthal Doyschen

Eliezer Adler (30 August 1866 – 16 January 1949) was a Galician-born British Jewish communal leader who became one of the leading figures in the early development of the Orthodox Jewish community of Gateshead, England. Histories of Jewish life in Gateshead and North-East England identify Adler as an important organizer during the community's formative period. Historian Z. Yaakov Wise described Adler as a leader of Gateshead's Orthodox community in the early twentieth century.

== Early life ==
Adler was born on 30 August 1866 in Stanisławów, Galicia, then part of Austria-Hungary and now Ivano-Frankivsk in Ukraine. He came to England in 1882 and was living in Gateshead by the later 1880s.

He married Sarah Rosenthal Doyschen.

An 1894 commercial directory listed "Eliezar Adler" at 128 Redheugh Road, Gateshead, and gave his occupation as watchmaker and jeweller.

A naturalisation list published in The Jewish Chronicle on 8 August 1902 recorded "Eliezar Adler" at 3 Elysium Lane, Gateshead.

== Gateshead Jewish community ==
By the late 1880s Adler had become active in Gateshead's developing Jewish community. Lewis Olsover and Miriam Dansky both identify him as an important figure in its early growth.

Records of the Gateshead Hebrew Congregation list Adler as treasurer in 1887 and again from 1897 to 1901. He served as president of the congregation in 1913–1914.

In 1903 Adler was listed as a trustee and chairman of a synagogue building committee in Gateshead.

Adler also participated in the religious life of the community. In May 1906 he spoke at a gathering held after a siyum of tractate Pesachim.

In October 1906 he was named Chatan Torah at the Gateshead Beth Hamedrash, and later that month he conducted festival services there.

In 1910 Adler served as treasurer of a project for a new Beth Hamedrash and offered a freehold site for the proposed building.

Adler remained associated with the communal and religious life of Gateshead for several decades. JCR-UK's biographical profile, drawing on Lewis Olsover's history and Jewish communal records, describes him as a prominent organizer and religious figure in the community.

== Family ==
Adler and his wife Sarah raised a family in Gateshead. One of their sons was Yoir Adler, also known as Joir Adler, who was born in Gateshead in 1900 and later served Jewish communities in several countries.

Rabbi Raymond Apple wrote that Yoir Adler was born in Gateshead in 1900 and studied at a yeshiva in Jerusalem.

The Jewish Historical Society of Hong Kong records Joir Adler as the Orthodox religious leader of Ohel Leah Synagogue from August 1961 until late 1962.

He subsequently served the Jewish community of Tokyo. In December 1966 the Jewish Telegraphic Agency reported that Rabbi J. Adler had served for approximately three years as rabbi of the Tokyo Jewish community after previously serving as minister of the Jewish community in Hong Kong. During his time in Tokyo he taught approximately 25 children in afternoon classes maintained by the community.

== Legacy ==
Dansky described Adler as one of the most prominent personalities of the early Gateshead community and recorded that his place in the Gateshead synagogue continued to be left vacant in recognition of his contribution.

His role in the development of the community continued to be commemorated decades after his death. In 2015 a residential development near Elysium Lane in Gateshead was named Adler Close in his memory. Reporting on the opening of the development, the Jewish Tribune described Adler as an important figure in the establishment of Gateshead's organized Jewish community and noted the historical association of the Adler family with Elysium Lane.

A 2008 obituary in The Jewish Chronicle also referred to Eliezer Adler as a founder of the Gateshead Hebrew Congregation when discussing the family of his grandson Chaim Jacob Heilpern. Wise's academic study similarly identifies Adler as a leader of the Gateshead Orthodox community.

== Death ==
Adler died on 16 January 1949, aged 82. He is buried at Rainsough Jewish Cemetery in the Manchester area.
