= Saint Lazarus Church =

Saint Lazarus Church, St. Lazarus' Church or Church of Saint Lazarus may refer to:

- Chapel of Saint Lazarus, Salvador, Bahia, Brazil
- Church of Saint Lazarus, Larnaca, Cyprus
- St. Lazarus' Church, Chennai, Tamil Nadu, India
- St. Lazarus' Church, Macau
- Church of Saint Lazarus, Al-Eizariya, Palestine
- Church of Saint Lazarus, Lima
- Greek Orthodox Church of Saint Lazarus, Al-Eizariya, Palestine
- Saint Lazarus Church, Iași, Romania
