= Eliezer Zussman-Sofer =

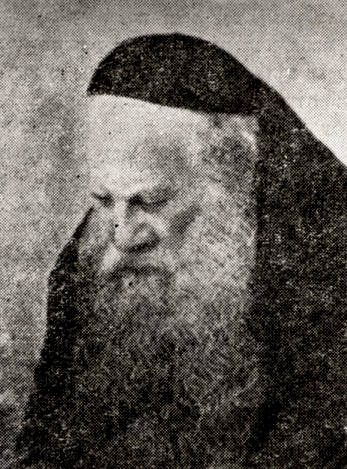
- Born: 28 February 1828; Bratislava (Pozsony/Pressburg)
- Died: 10 October 1902 (aged 74); Paks

Eliezer Zussman-Sofer (1828–1902) was a Hungarian rabbi and head of a yeshivah. He was the son of Rabbi Mordechai Efraim Fischel Sofer-Zussman of Pressburg and a son-in-law of Rabbi Joel Ungar of Shochtiz and Paks (Paks).

Zussman-Sofer was rabbi of Halas in 1850 and Paks in 1880. He authored a number of works including Yalkut Eliezer, Et Sofer, Meleah Ketoret and Damesek Eliezer.

All of his sons became rabbis:

- Simon, rabbi in Sendra and Paks
- Joseph Leib, rabbi in Derecske (author of Yalkut Sofer)
- Judah, rabbi in Kadelburg, Yemring, Miklosh and Arad (author of Mate Yehudah and the father-in-law of Rabbi Chaim Sofer of Munkacs and Budapest)
- Shmuel Benjamin, rabbi in Derecske (author of Divrei Sofrim).

His sons-in-law were Rabbi Yitzchok Yakov Blum of Sanshun (Hajdúsámson) and Kroly (Nagykároly and Rabbi Amram Fischer of Yunk .- Gyönk.

Zussman-Sofer died on the eve of Yom Kippur, October 1902.

== Further Study ==
- Volume 1 of Yalkut Eliezer on hebrewbooks.com
- Volume 3 of Yalkut Eliezer on archive.org
