= Eleazar Swalmius =

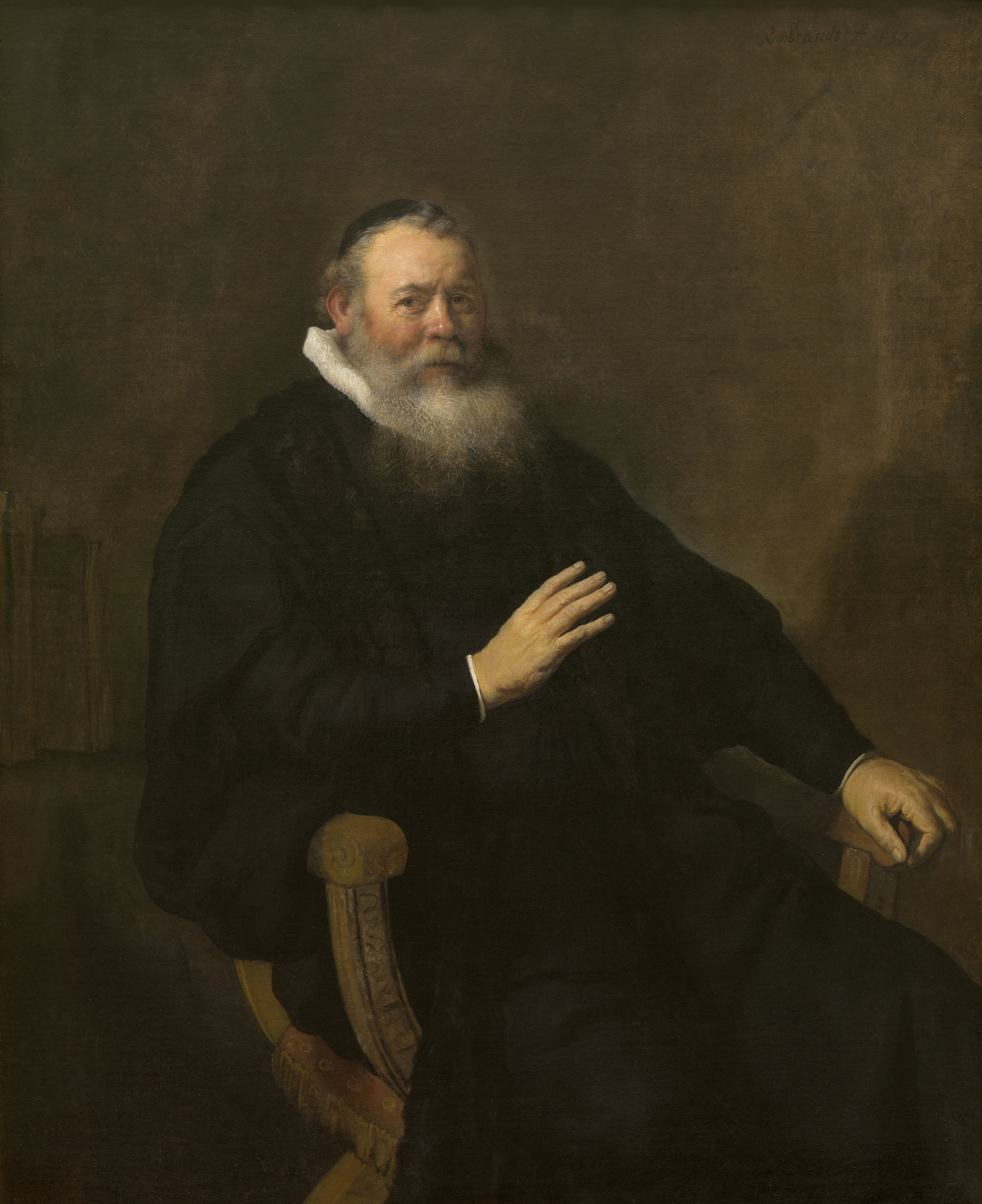
- Portrait by Rembrandt, 1637, in the Royal Museum of Fine Arts Antwerp
- Born: 1582; Rhoon
- Died: June 4, 1652 (aged 69–70); Amsterdam

Eleazar Swalmius or Eleasar Swalmius (1582 – June 4, 1652) was a Dutch theologian known today for his portrait by Rembrandt.

Swalmius was born in Rhoon as the son of Hendrick van de Swalme, or Henricus Swalmius, who was probably born in Flanders and spent time in England before becoming a preacher in Rhoon in 1580. It was in Rhoon that he changed his name from Swalme to Swalmius. Swalmius the Elder had 4 sons:

1. Arnoldus, who became a preacher in Westmaas, 's Gravesande
2. Hendrik the younger, who married Judith van Breda in 1600 and became preacher of Oud-Alblas and later of the Grote Kerk, Haarlem in 1625
3. Carel (1587-1640) who became a dike-reeve in IJzendijke
4. This Eleazar, who after being a preacher in Amsterdam for 25 years was portrayed by Rembrandt (or someone in his studio).

In 1605 he became a preacher in Poortugaal en Hoogvliet, in 1612 in Schiedam, in 1616 in Utrecht (study period), and finally from 1625 preacher in Amsterdam, where he took part in the Remonstrantse twisten.
