= Eliezer Kahana =

Eliezer ben Reuven Kahana was a Jewish preacher and homiletic exegete in Karlin, present-day Belarus, at the beginning of the eighteenth century. His works include: Siah Sefunim (Zolkiev, 1751–52), a commentary on the Five Scrolls, each of them having its special subtitle; and Ṭa'ame Torah (ib. 1752–65), on the accents, the Masoretic Text, and the recitation of the Pentateuch.
