= Lazarus Sinim =

Indonesian footballer (born 2004)

Personal information
- Full name: Lazarus Anthonius Willem Christian Sinim
- Date of birth: 25 March 2004 (age 22)
- Place of birth: Merauke, Indonesia
- Positions: Forward; striker

Team information
- Current team: Persipura Jayapura
- Number: 79

Senior career*
| Years | Team | Apps | (Gls) |
| 2025 | Perss Soe | | |
| 2025–2026 | PSN Ngada | | (10) |
| 2026– | Persipura Jayapura | 2 | (0) |
- * Club domestic league appearances and goals as of 26 September 2026

Lazarus Anthonius Willem Christian Sinim (born 25 March 2004) is an Indonesian professional footballer who plays as a forward or striker for Championship club Persipura Jayapura.

== Club career ==
=== PSN Ngada ===
Sinim began his competitive career in the semi-professional ranks, featuring as the primary attacking spearhead for East Nusa Tenggara-based club PSN Ngada during the 2025–26 Liga 4 national phase campaign. He enjoyed an exceptional breakout season, netting 10 goals in the tournament to finish among the top scorers while simultaneously driving PSN Ngada to reach the semi-finals and achieve promotion to the higher tier.

=== Persipura Jayapura ===
Following his impressive displays in the national competition, Sinim was invited for a trial period with Persipura Jayapura. After impressing the technical coaching staff during his initial training blocks at the Mandala Stadium, he officially signed a professional contract with the club on 24 July 2026 ahead of the 2026–27 Championship campaign. On 19 August 2026, he scored his first unofficial goal for Persipura during a 1–1 pre-season friendly draw against Garudayaksa at the Lestarindo Field in Boyolali. Sinim made his league debut for Persipura Jayapura on 18 September 2026, in a 0–0 draw win over Kendal Tornado at the Gelora Delta Stadium.
