= Eleazar, son of Abinadab =

Biblical figure who was a guard for the Ark of the Covenant

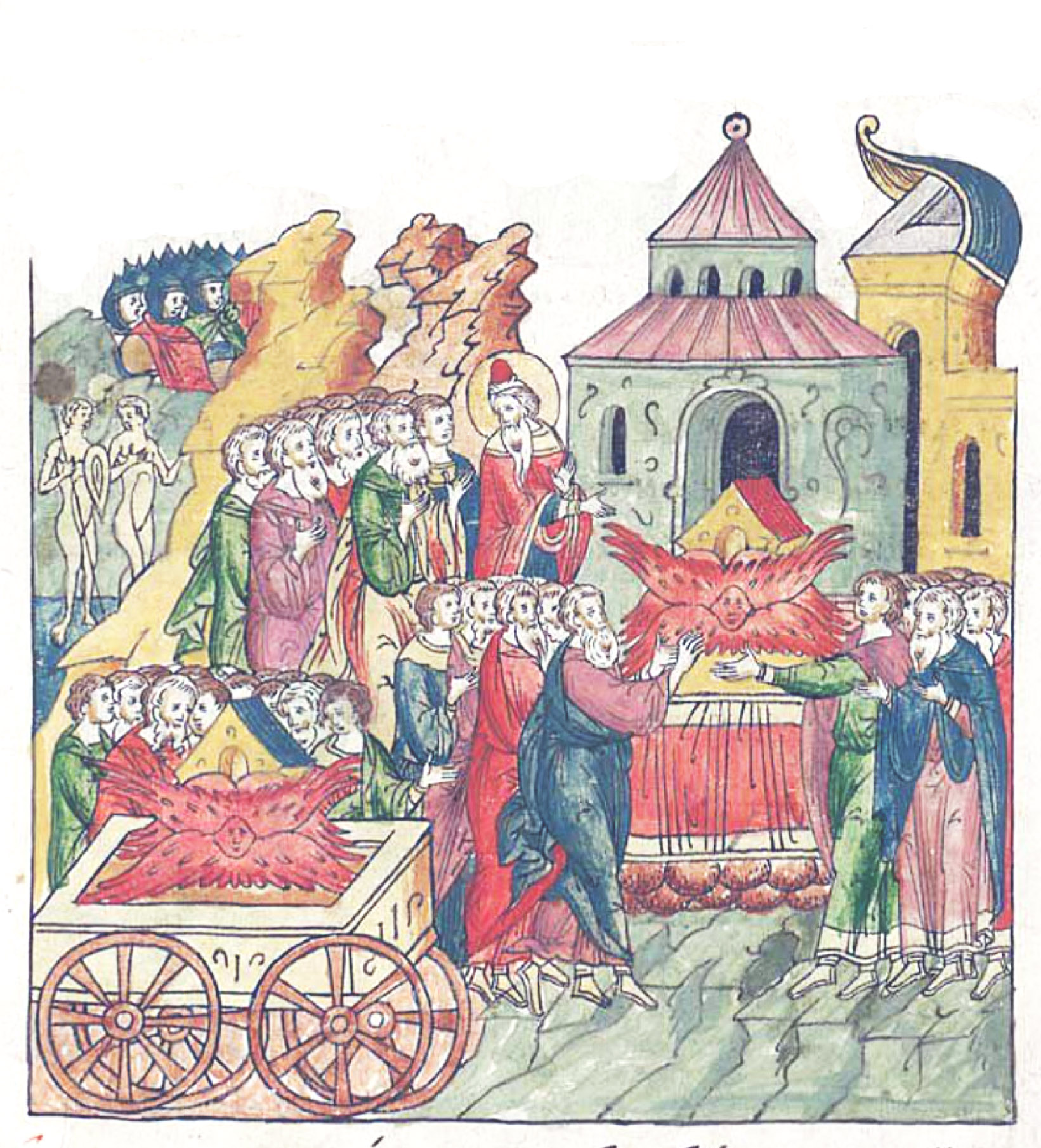
Eleazar receiving the Ark after the Philistine captivity of the Ark

Eleazar, son of Abinadab or Aminadab, was an inhabitant of Kiriath-Jearim and was "consecrated" ("set apart") to guard the Ark of the Covenant, while it remained in the house of his father Abinadab after its return from Philistine captivity. The Ark remained in Abinadab's house for 20 years (1 Samuel 7:1-2)
