= Eleazar, son of Phinehas =

Son of Phinehas

Eleazar was a son of Phinehas. He is mentioned in Ezra 8:33 as accompanying Meremoth, who took receipt of silver and gold belonging to the temple from Ezra and his party when they returned to Jerusalem.

He may have been added to the story to connect the Aaronide priests.
