= Lazarus Chigwandali =

Malawian musician

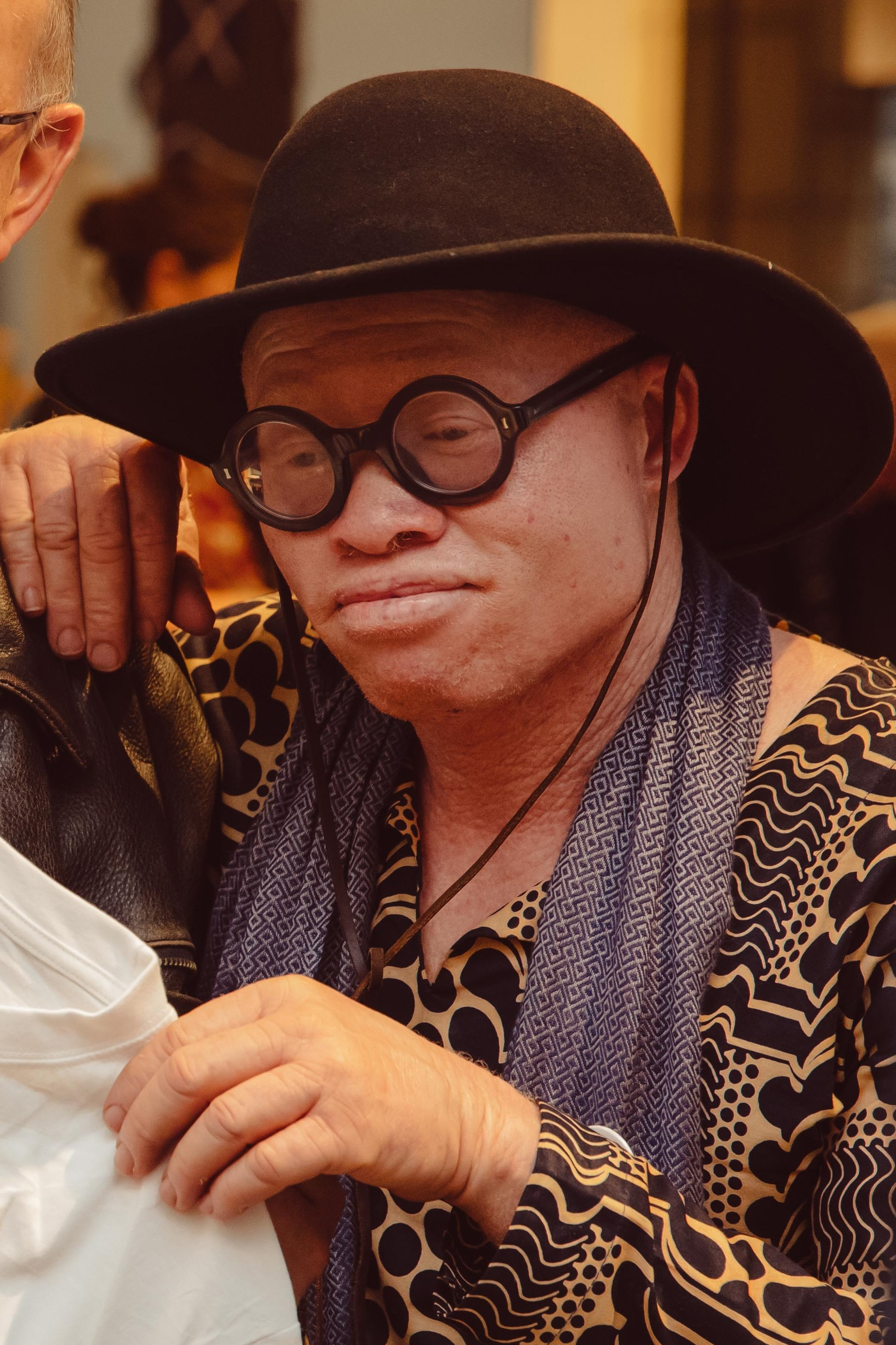
- Born: c.1980 lived in Nankumba
- Occupation: musician

Lazarus Chigwandali (c.1980 - ) is a Malawian musician. He is a person with albinism.

== Life ==
Chigwandali was born in about 1980.

He was raised in the village of Nankumba where he was treated with disdain because of his condition. His younger brother used to perform with him until he died of skin cancer, due to his albinism.

After being discovered performing on the streets of Lilongwe, he recorded his debut album with Swedish producer Johan Hugo. A film about Lazarus, produced by Madonna, featured at the Tribeca Film Festival in April 2019.
