= Eleazar ben Judah of Bartota =

Eleazar b. Judah of Bartota (Hebrew: אלעזר בן יהודה איש ברתותא) was a rabbi of the first and second centuries (third generation of tannaim).

== Name ==
His given name also appears as Eliezer, Lazar or Elazar. His place of origin also appears as Biria, Birta, Birtota, or Bartuta; instead of Bartota.

His name is sometimes shortened to Eliezer ben Judah or Eleazar of Bartota.

== Teachings ==
He was the pupil of R. Joshua ben Hananiah and a contemporary of R. Akiva, who in many instances disputed the statements Eleazar delivered in the name of R. Joshua, and then himself delivered his own version of R. Joshua's statements. His is recorded merely few times in the Mishnah and the Talmud, and half of his recordings there are statements in the name of his Rabbi. His students Gamaliel II and Shimon bar Yochai quoted halachic rulings in his name.

== Charity ==
While his name is connected with but few halakhot, and with still fewer midrashim, he gained a reputation for his charity. His motto was, "Give Him of His own: thyself and what thou possessest are His, as David says: 'All things come of thee, and of thine own have we given thee'"; and he lived up to his motto.

It is related that he was so extravagant in his benevolence as to give away all that he possessed; wherefore the collectors for the poor would avoid meeting him. In illustration of this characteristic, the Talmud cites the following instance: "Eleazar's daughter was to be married. While making purchases for the occasion, he espied the collectors, who were hiding from him. He overtook them, and begged them to acquaint him with their mission. They informed him that they were soliciting for a marriage portion for a couple of orphans, whereupon he exclaimed, 'Verily, that couple takes precedence over my daughter'; and he gave them all that he had about him."

Legend adds that he retained one zuz, and with that he bought wheat, which he carried home and put away in the storeroom. When his wife soon afterward tried to open the room in order to see what Eleazar had brought, it was found to be full to overflowing with grain. In the meantime Eleazar had repaired to the academy, and thither his daughter hastened with the joyful tidings, remarking, "Come and see what thy friend has done for thee"; but when he had heard her story, he consecrated the grain also to charity.
