= Abraham Eleazar =

Fictitious author of alchemy

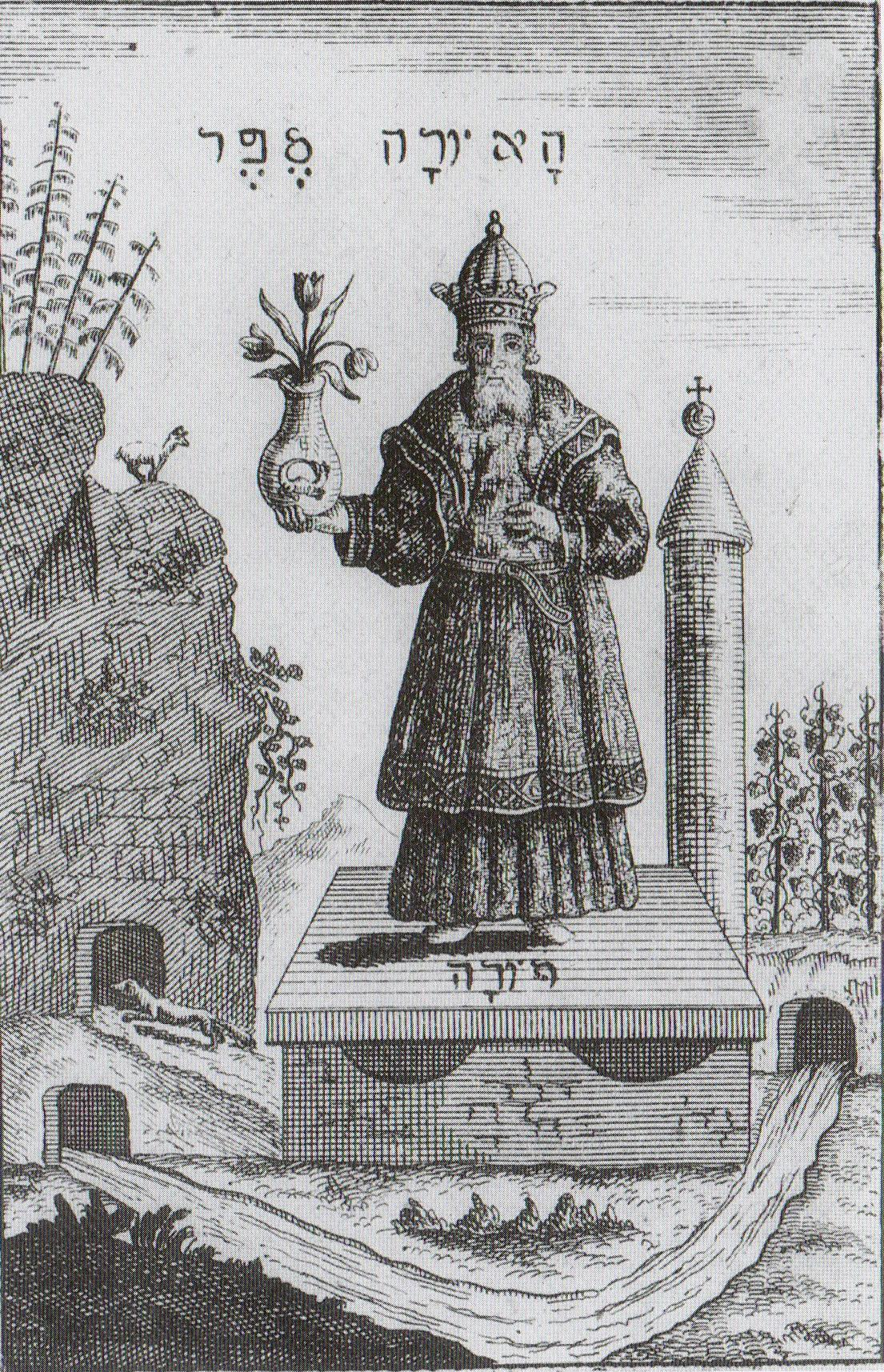
Rabbi Abraham Eleazar

Abraham Eleazar is the fictitious author of an alchemical work titled R. Abrahami Eleazaris Uraltes Chymisches Werk ("R. Abraham Eleazar's Age-Old Chymical Work"). The book was first published in Erfurt in 1735; a second edition was published in Leipzig in 1760.

In the preface of the first part of the work, it is claimed that Abraham Eleazar drew his alchemical notions and illustrations from ancient copper tablets of Tubal-cain. The second part is ascribed to another rabbi named Samuel Baruch. It is further stated that the original was written in Latin, Arabic, Chaldaean, and Syriac.

Historical evidence suggests that the actual author behind both works was Julius Gervasius of Schwarzburg, who is credited as the publication's editor.
