= Lazarus (bishop of Milan) =

Archbishop of Milan

- Archbishop of Milan
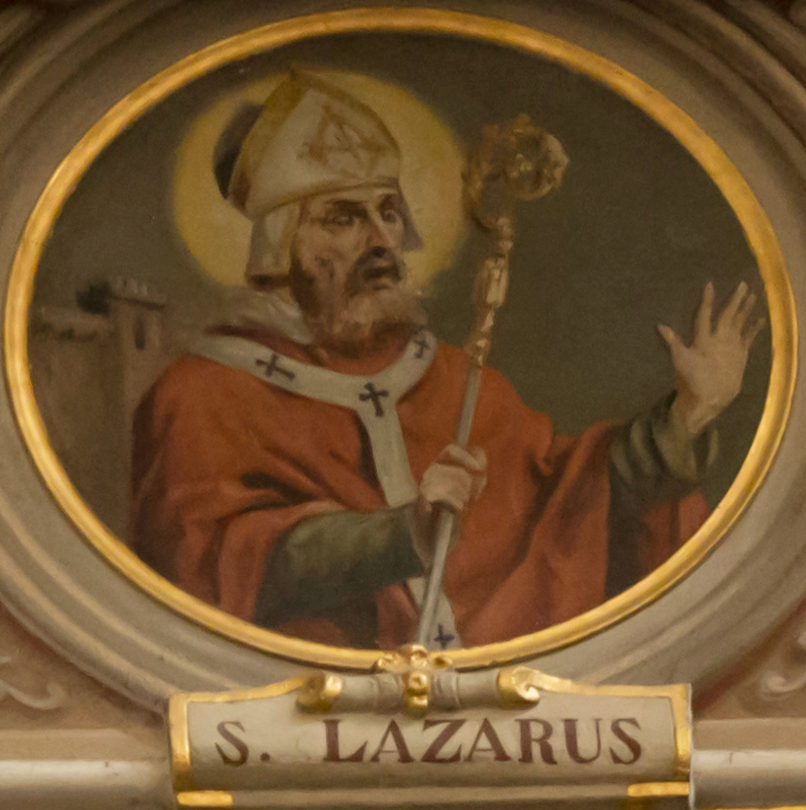
- Church: Christian Church
- Appointed: AD 438
- Term ended: AD 449
- Predecessor: Glycerius
- Successor: Eusebius

Personal details
- Born: c. 4th century AD Milan, Italy, Roman Empire
- Died: 14 March 449 AD Milan, Italy, Roman Empire

Sainthood
- Feast day: 11 February
- Venerated in: Catholic Church; Eastern Orthodox Church

Lazarus (Italian: Lazzaro) was Archbishop of Milan from 438 to 449 AD. He is honoured as a saint in the Catholic and Eastern Orthodox Churches and his feast day is 11 February.

== Life ==
Not much has been discovered about the life and episcopate of Lazarus. He is reported to have had a stern appearance and he probably studied in Milan. Following Pope Leo the Great, he may also have taken measures against the Manichaeans.

Lazarus died on 14 March 449. He was buried in the Church of Saint Nazarius and Celsus in Milan. His feast day was adjusted to 11 February due to the time of Lent. A late tradition, with no historical basis, associates Lazarus with the Milanese family of the Beccardi.
