= Castritian =

3rd-century bishop

- Bishop of Milan
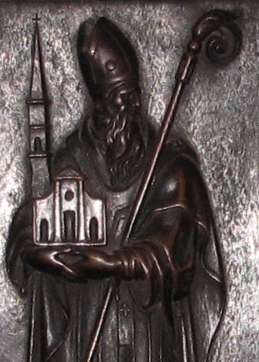
- Church: Catholic Church
- In office: mid 3rd-century
- Predecessor: Caius
- Successor: Calimerius

Personal details
- Born: c. 3rd century AD
- Died: c. 3rd century AD Milan, Roman Italy, Roman Empire

Sainthood
- Feast day: 1 December
- Venerated in: Catholic Church

Castritian (Latin: Castritianus, Italian: Castriziano) was Bishop of Milan in mid 3rd-century. He is honoured as a Saint in the Catholic Church and his feast day is on December 1.

== Life ==
Almost nothing is known about the life and the episcopate of Castritian, except that he was bishop of Milan in mid 3rd-century, and that his corpse was allegedly buried in a cemetery in the area of Porta Romana, not far from the present Basilica of Saint Calimerius. His relics were later translated into the church of San Giovanni in Conca, which was demolished between the 19th and 20th century.

Middle age texts, such as the Historia Dataria dated 11th-century, add biographic details which are to be considered legendary. Among these legendary traditions, is the length of his episcopate (41 years), the start of his reign shortly after the Emperor Domitian in 97 and the consequent date of death in 138. Also legendary is his consecration as church of a house donated by a certain Philips, even if modern scholars, supported by 4th-century documents, deem as likely the early existence of a house church with a garden in an area between Porta Ticinese and Porta Magenta.
