= Santa Maria in Gariverto, Piacenza =

Building in Piacenza, Italy

Coordinates: 45.05395°N 9.69807°E

San Maria in Gariverto is a Neoclassic style, Roman Catholic parish church, located on Via Genocchi #33, in Piacenza, Region of Emilia Romagna, Italy.

== History ==
A church at this site has existed since at 927, when reports indicate it was founded by Gariverto, son of the nobleman Garibaldo da Gossolengo. For years it was a subsidiary to the cathedral. The present church is the result of a major reconstruction circa 1785 with the sober classic façade added in 1930s by Pietro Berzolla. Between 1975 and 1985, the presbytery was refurbished. The church had a number of sculptures added by Paolo Perotti, and a statue of St Camillo de Lellis by Ada Tassi. Among the paintings in the church is a canvas depicting St Ildefonso (1652) by Francesco Ferrante and a Madonna del Bossi painted by Carlo Carasi. Scarabelli recalls that the second altar on the right has a fresco by Giovanni Manfredini.
