= Anathalon =

Roman Catholic Saint and Bishop

- Bishop of Milan
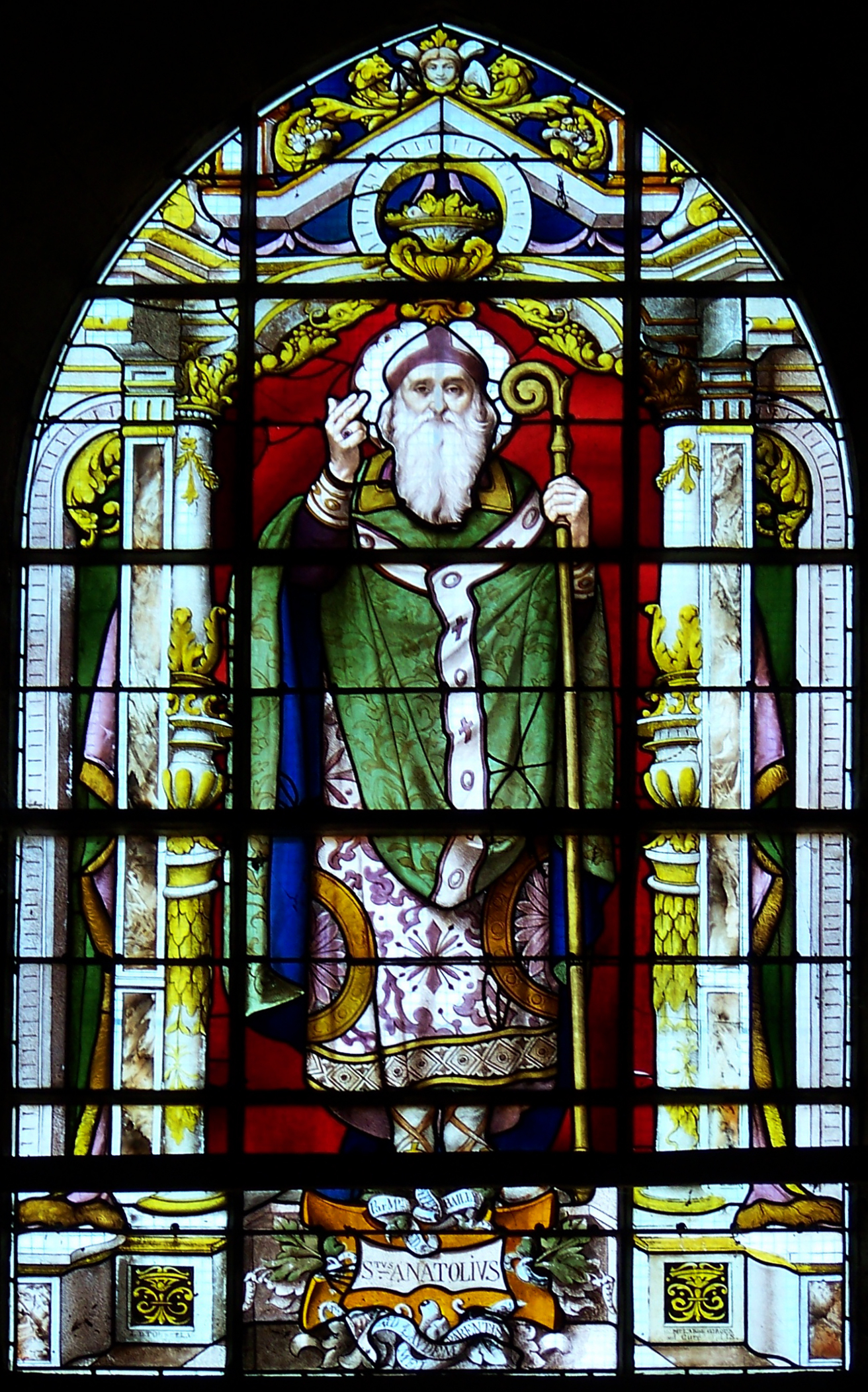
- Church: Early Church (pre-schism)
- In office: end 2nd – early 3rd century
- Predecessor: Barnabas (legendary)
- Successor: Caius

Personal details
- Born: c. 2nd century AD Greece, Roman Empire
- Died: c. 3rd century AD Brescia, Italy, Roman Empire

Sainthood
- Feast day: 24 September (Milan: 25 September)
- Venerated in: Catholic and Eastern Orthodox Churches

Anathalon (Latin: Anatalius, Anatolius, Italian: Anatalone, Anatalo, Anatolio, Byzantine Greek: Ανατόλιος) was the first recorded Bishop of Milan and lived at the end 2nd-century or early 3rd-century. A later tradition made him the also the first bishop of Brescia. He is honoured as a saint in the Catholic and Eastern Orthodox churches, which celebrate his feast day on 24 September. In Milan, however, this is commemorated on 25 September.

== Life ==
Almost nothing is known about the life and the episcopate of Anathalon, except that he had a Greek name, that he was bishop of Milan at the end 2nd-century or early 3rd-century, and that he died during a pastoral trip in Brescia, which was under his jurisdiction.

Medieval texts add biographic details which are to be considered legendary. The treatise De Episcopis Mettensibus of Paul the Deacon (8th-century) narrates that Anathalon was a pupil of Saint Peter who sent him as bishop in Milan, while the Historia Dataria (11th-century) explains that Anathalon was a disciple of the Apostle Barnabas who came to preach in Italy and consecrated him as bishop of Milan. Another legend says that Anathalon built a church in Milan dedicated to the Savior over an ancient pagan temple dedicated to Mercury, in an area where the church of San Giorgio al Palazzo now stands.

== Veneration ==
The older place of veneration for this saint was the basilica ad Concilia Sanctorum in Milan, no longer extant, near the present church of San Babila. Only in 1268 his relics were discovered in Brescia and translated into the church of Saint Florian. In 1472 his relics were translated to the Old Cathedral of Brescia where they remain.

The saint's feast is observed on 24 September, the traditional date of his death. In Milan, its celebration was transferred in the Middle Ages to the day following, on which date it is still celebrated in that city. This is due to, historically, a clash of saints' days: At that time, the feast of the patron saint of the basilica church of Santa Tecla, Milan, of importance locally, was already being held on the earlier date; 25 September has ever since been designated there for Anathalon.

== Notes ==
Catholic Church titles
Preceded by Saint Barnabas	Bishop of Milan; 51–64	Succeeded by Caius
