= Carlo Caccia Dominioni =

Italia Catholic prelate

- Auxiliary bishop of Milan
- Church: Catholic Church
- Appointed: 28 September 1855
- Term ended: 6 October 1866
- Other post: Titular Bishop of Danaba

Orders
- Consecration: 2 December 1855 (Bishop) by Bartolomeo Carlo Romilli

Personal details
- Born: 14 May 1802 Milan
- Died: 6 October 1866 (aged 64) Cornate d'Adda

Carlo Caccia Dominioni (1802–1866) was an Italian prelate, who became auxiliary bishop of Milan and titular bishop of Danaba in 1855, and titular bishop of Famagusta in 1857.

== Life ==
Born in Milan to the noble family of Caccia Dominioni, he entered the seminary of Milan in 1812, and in 1826, he was ordained a priest. In 1853 he was named member of the archdiocesan Chapter, and two years later he was named auxiliary bishop of Milan and titular bishop of Famagusta. In 1859, archbishop Romilli died, and the chapter of the cathedral named Caccia Dominioni as diocesan administrator during the vacancy. For the succession to archbishop Romilli, Caccia Dominioni was one of the candidates but Pope Pius IX chose with the advice of Austrian Emperator the more conservative Paolo Angelo Ballerini the vicar of archbishop Romilli.

Soon after the death of archbishop Romilli the Austrian Empire was defeated in the Second Italian War of Independence and the new Italian government refused to recognize Ballerini as archbishop of Milan, so Caccia Dominioni was forced to assume the duty of archbishop of Milan. The events of the years 1859 and 1860 stiffened Caccia Dominioni who refused to celebrate a Te Deum for the birth of Italy, in reaction for this decision many clergy of the archdiocese together with many lay people forced Caccia Dominioni to escape in his family residence in Cornate d'Adda and later in Monza. He was later deported to Turin and sentenced by the Italian authorities to spend time in jail that he never served, and he wasn't allowed to come back to Milan.

He died in Cornate d'Adda in 1866.
