= Lawrence I (bishop of Milan) =

Archbishop of Milan

- Archbishop of Milan
- Church: Catholic Church
- Appointed: c. 490 AD
- Term ended: c. 511
- Predecessor: Theodorus I
- Successor: Eustorgius II

Personal details
- Died: c. 511

Sainthood
- Feast day: July 25
- Venerated in: Catholic Church

Lawrence I (Latin: Laurentius, Italian: Lorenzo) was Archbishop of Milan from 490 to c. 511. He is honoured as a saint in the Catholic Church and his feast day is July 25.

== Life ==
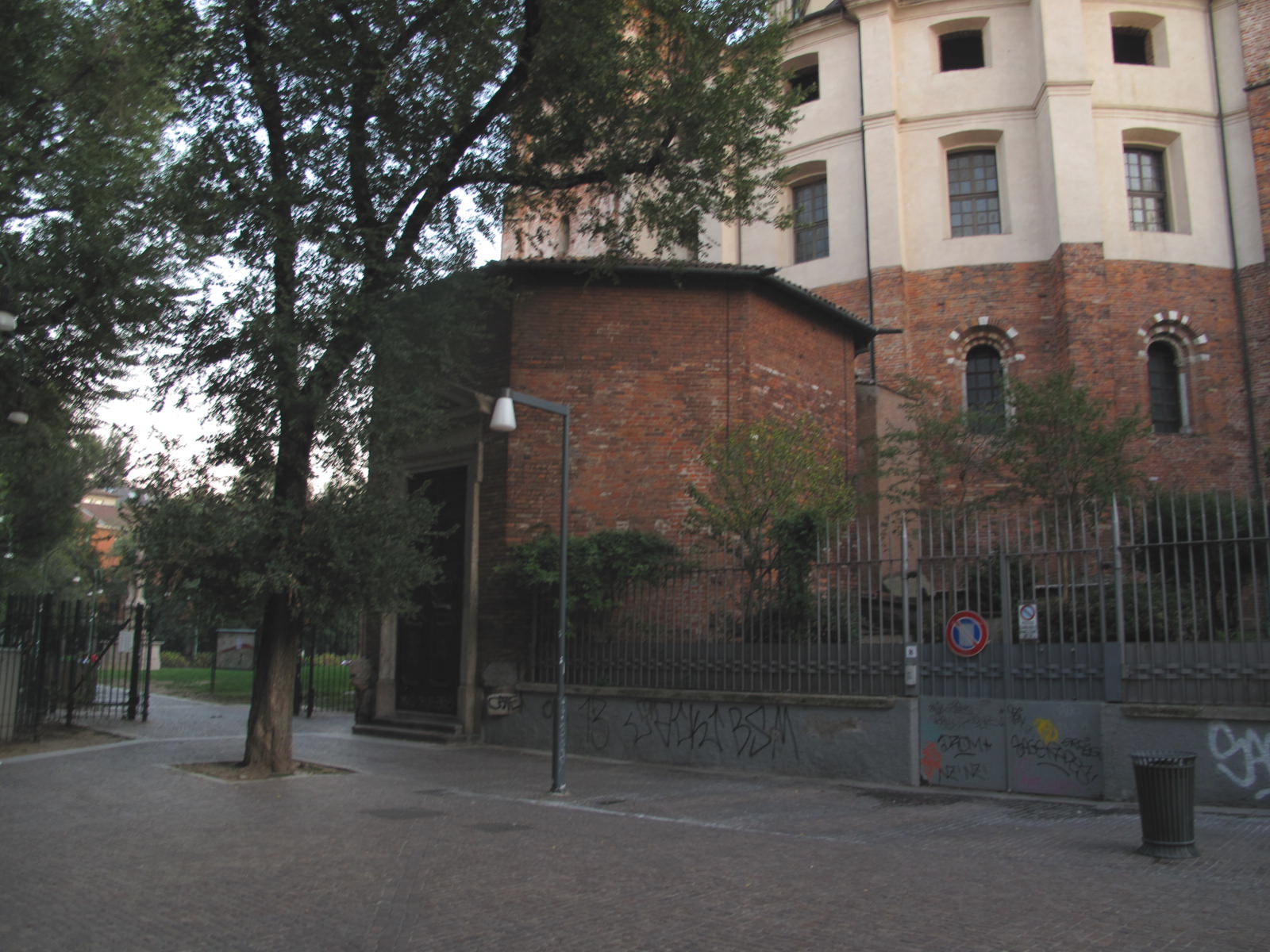
Chapel of Saint Sixtus, aside the basilica of St. Lorenzo, built by Lawrence

Most of the information we have about this bishop are due to the writings of Ennodius, bishop of Pavia (died 521), who was a relative and secretary of his. Lawrence was elected bishop of Milan in about 490 (or 489) by both the Latins and the Heruli, who invaded Italy led by Odoacer.

In the frame of the war between Odoacer and Theodoric, leader of the Ostrogoths, Lawrence supported the latter, hoping that Theodoric could better preserve the Latin population, militarily overpowered by the invasions of the East Germanic tribes. However Lawrence did not directly intervene in the fight. Later he went to Ravenna to plead Theodoric to forgive the Latins who had sided with Odoacer.

In a year between 491 and 493, an East Germanic tribe, probably the Rugii, raided Milan and devastated the town: Lawrence was made prisoner. After this raid, Lawrence led the reconstruction of the town, and he renovated the Basilica of Saint Calimerius, the Basilica Sanctorum (not surely identified), a baptistery (possibly San Giovanni alle Fonti) and the Church of Saint Nazarius and Celsus where he ordered to paint the figures of twelve bishops of Milan. He also built a house, probably as residence for the bishops, and added the chapel of Saint Sixtus to the basilica of St. Lorenzo Maggiore. He further restored the Basilica di Sant'Ambrogio where he built the Ciborium, the columns of which are still visible to this day.

Lawrence took a stand in favor of the legitimacy of the election of Pope Symmachus against the claims of the Antipope Laurentius, the latter supported by the Miaphysite Byzantine Emperor, near Monophysite positions. Lawrence gave financial support to Symmachus, and in 502 he, along with Peter bishop of Ravenna, presided over a synod in Rome which confirmed Symmachus' right to the papacy. He also participated to the consecration of the Basilica Apostolorum in Novara.

Lawrence died after 22 years of episcopate, so in c. 511 AD, on the 25 July. His remains were interred on the 27 July in the chapel of Saint Hyppolytus aside the city’s basilica of St. Lorenzo Maggiore. His feast day is celebrated on July 25 in such basilica and together all the saint bishops of Milan on 25 September. A late tradition, with no historical basis, associates Lawrence with the family of the Litta.
