= Eustorgius =

Eustorgius or Eustorge can refer to:

- Eustorgius I, bishop of Milan from 344 to 350
- Eustorgius II, bishop of Milan from 512 to 518
- Eustorge de Scorailles, bishop of Limoges from 1106 until 1137
- Eustorgius of Nicomedia, father of Saint Pantaleon
- Eustorgius of Montaigu, archbishop of Nicosia in the 13th century

== See also ==
- Basilica of Sant'Eustorgio
