= Madonna degli Angeli, Vigevano =

Church in Vigevano, Italy

Coordinates: 45°18′39″N 8°51′17″E

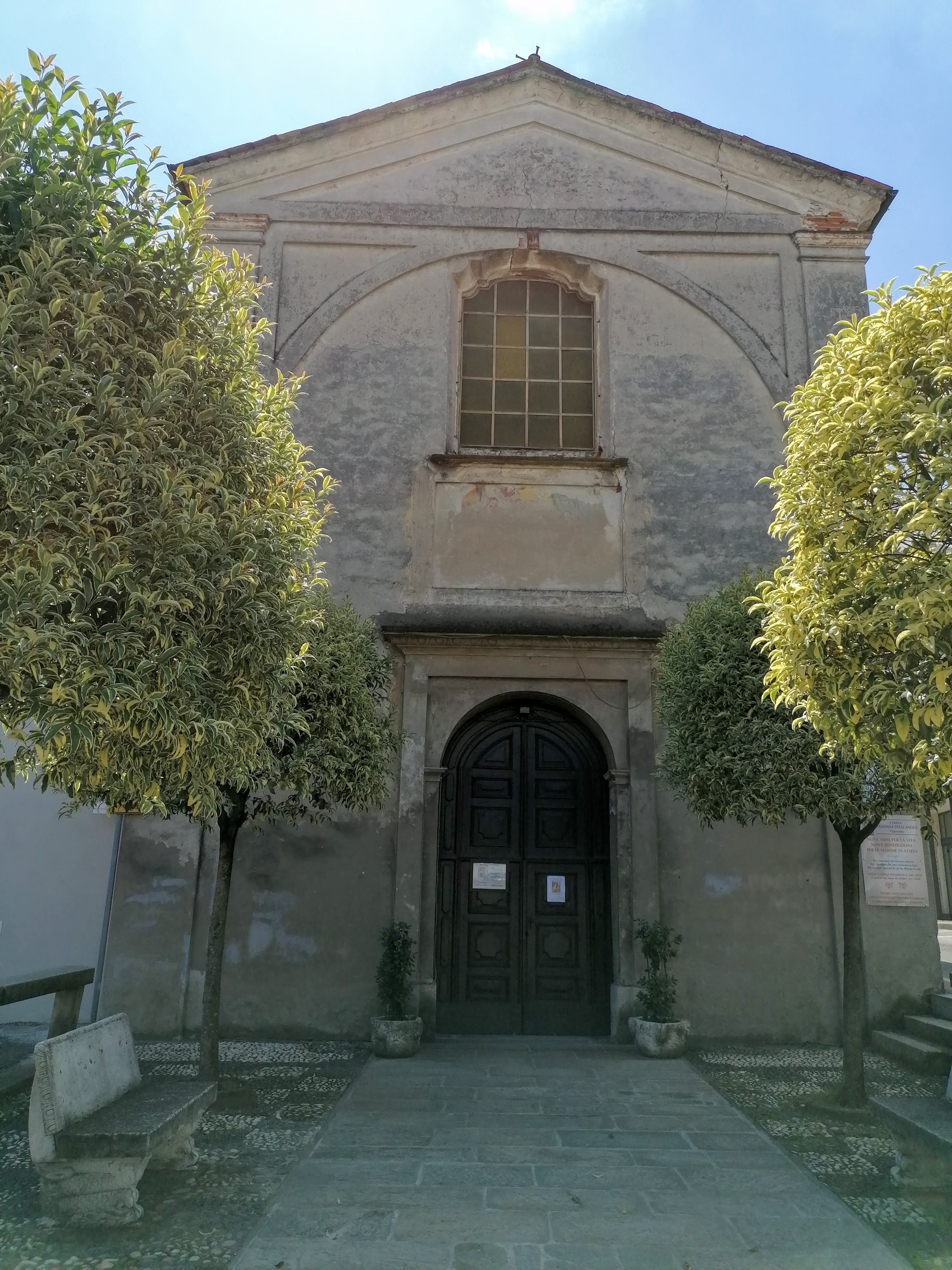
The church.

The Church of Madonna degli Angeli is a religious building in Vigevano, in the province of Pavia and diocese of Vigevano.

== Description and history ==
The construction of the church began in July 1583, when it became the seat of the brotherhood of the Annunciation. The consecration of the place took place three years later. The chapels, however, date back to 1657 and are dedicated to Saint Maurus and Saint Monas, bishop of Milan in the 3rd century; the altar dates back to 1679 and there is a painting of the Nativity from the same period, probably by Zanetto Bugatto. The choir dates back to 1692, while the pipe organ, built by Giovanni Rondini and rebuilt by the Serassi Brothers in 1832, is the oldest in the city.
