= Luigi Nazari di Calabiana =

Italian politician

His Excellency Luigi Giuseppe Nazari di Calabiana
- Archbishop of Milan
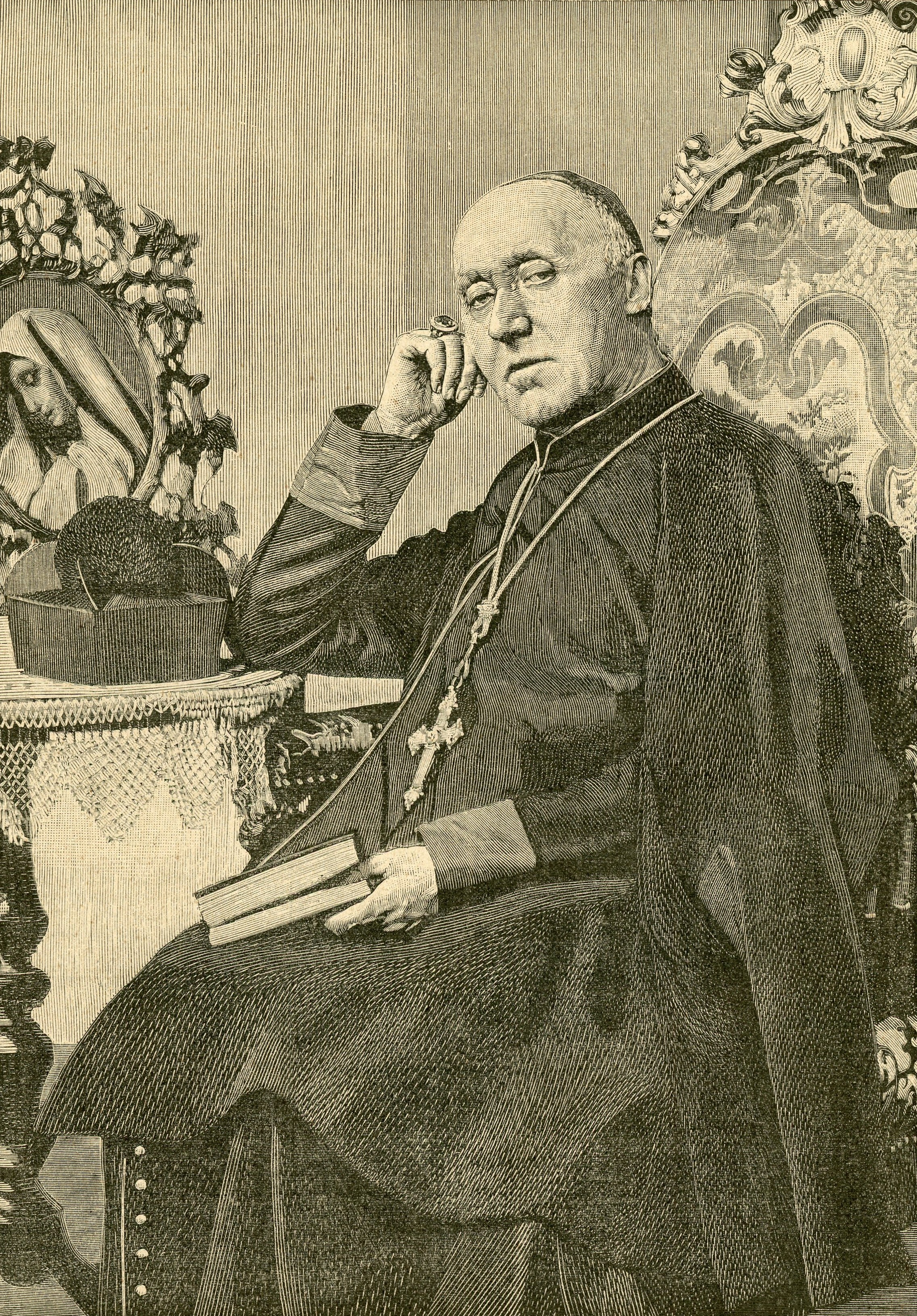
- Church: Catholic Church
- See: Milan
- Appointed: 27 March 1867
- Term ended: 23 October 1893
- Predecessor: Paolo Angelo Ballerini
- Successor: Andrea Carlo Ferrari
- Other post: member of Italian Senate

Orders
- Ordination: 29 May 1831 (Priest)
- Consecration: 6 June 1847 (Bishop) by Ugo Pietro Spinola

Personal details
- Born: 27 July 1808 Savigliano
- Died: 23 October 1893 (aged 85) Milan
- Buried: Cathedral of Milan

Luigi Giuseppe Nazari di Calabiana (27 July 1808 – 23 October 1893) was an Italian churchman and politician: a senator of the Kingdom of Sardinia and Archbishop of Milan.

== Biography ==
He was born on 27 July 1808 in Savigliano to Filippo, count of Calabiana, and the noblewoman Sofia Toesca of the counts of Castezzo. On 18 March 1847 he was appointed bishop of Casale Monferrato by Charles Albert of Sardinia and consecrated bishop on 6 June 1847 in Rome by Cardinal Ugo Pietro Spinola. As bishop of Casale he was involved in the successful campaign to save its ancient Romanesque cathedral from demolition.

On 3 May 1848, he was nominated as senator by king Charles Albert, taking the oath on 22 May of that year. He unsuccessfully opposed Siccardi reforms of 1850, which were intended to revoke certain ancient privileges which the Catholic Church enjoyed in Piedmont, and he led the opposition to further reforms in 1855, intended to institute a "free church in a free state", provoking the Calabiana crisis which forced the resignation of Cavour, although again the legislation was passed into law.

In 1867 he was named archbishop of Milan by Pope Pius IX, and his appointment solved the crisis in such an important and large diocese. Actually, the previous archbishop Paolo Angelo Ballerini of Milan had been suggested by the Austrian emperor, but he was not allowed to enter the town by the Kingdom of Sardinia that took possession of the Lombardy after the Second Italian War of Independence. So with the appointment of Nazari di Calabiana Milan again had a residence bishop. In the frame of the hostility between the Holy See and the kingdom of Sardinia (later Kingdom of Italy), Nazari di Calabiana was considered to be on conciliatory positions, while the previous archbishop Ballerini, who during Nazari's reign resided in Seregno near Milan, remained a fierce opponent of the Reign. Nazari di Calabian was never created cardinal.

As archbishop of Milan, Nazari di Calabiana is remembered for his social activity, for the erection of new churches in the suburbs of the town and for the discovery of the relics of Saint Ambrose and Gervasius and Protasius founded in an old sarcophagus buried under the altar of Basilica of Sant'Ambrogio.

At the First Vatican Council he was the leader of the minority of Italian bishops who opposed the introduction of the doctrine of papal infallibility, but after the proclamation of the dogma he promptly undersigned it. In 2000 it was claimed by one scholar that he was one of the consecrators of Church of England episcopus vagans Frederick George Lee in the Order of Corporate Reunion.

Luigi Nazari di Calabiana died in Milan on 23 October 1893.

== Sources ==
- Apeciti, Ennio (2013). "Nazari di Calabiana, Luigi," (in Italian), in: Dizionario Biografico degli Italiani Volume 78 (2013).
- Apeciti, Ennio (1992). Alcuni aspetti dell'episcopato di Luigi Nazari di Calabiana, arcivescovo di Milano (1867-1893): vicende della chiesa ambrosiana nella seconda metà del 1800. (in Italian). Milano: NED, 1992.
- Pierluigi Piano (ed.), Notizie Storiche della città di Casale Monferrato: un inedito dalla Biblioteca Ambrosiana di Milano, Circolo Culturale "I Marchesi del Monferrato", 2008.

Catholic Church titles
Preceded by Francesco Icheri di Malabaila	Bishop of Casale Monferrato; 1847 - 1867	Succeeded by Pietro Maria Ferré
Preceded by Paolo Angelo Ballerini	Archbishop of Milan; 1867 - 1893	Succeeded by Andrea Ferrari
