= Theodorus I (bishop of Milan) =

Italian bishop and saint

- Archbishop of Milan
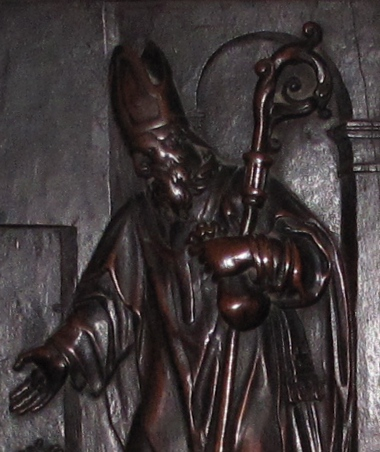
- Church: Catholic Church
- Appointed: 475 AD
- Term ended: 490
- Predecessor: Senator
- Successor: Lawrence I

Personal details
- Died: 490

Sainthood
- Feast day: 27 July
- Venerated in: Eastern Orthodox Church; Catholic Church

Theodorus I (Italian: Teodoro) was Archbishop of Milan from 475 to 490. He is honoured as a saint in the Eastern Orthodox Church and Catholic Church, and his feast day is 27 July.

== Life ==
Almost nothing is known about the life and the episcopate of Theodorus. His episcopate was marked with the seizure of power in Italy by the first Barbarian king, Odoacer (476), followed by the invasion of the Ostrogoths of Theodoric the Great in 488–490. According to the writings of Ennodius, bishop of Pavia in the 6th-century, in such difficult times Theodorus demonstrated to be a man of great firmness and wit, a firm leader for the oppressed population of Milan.

Theodorus died in 490, and his remains were interred in the city's basilica of St. Lorenzo Maggiore. His feast is celebrated on 27 July in such basilica and together all the saint bishops of Milan on 25 September. A late tradition, with no historical basis, associates Theodorus with the family of the Medici.
