= Calimerius =

Bishop of Milan

- Bishop of Milan
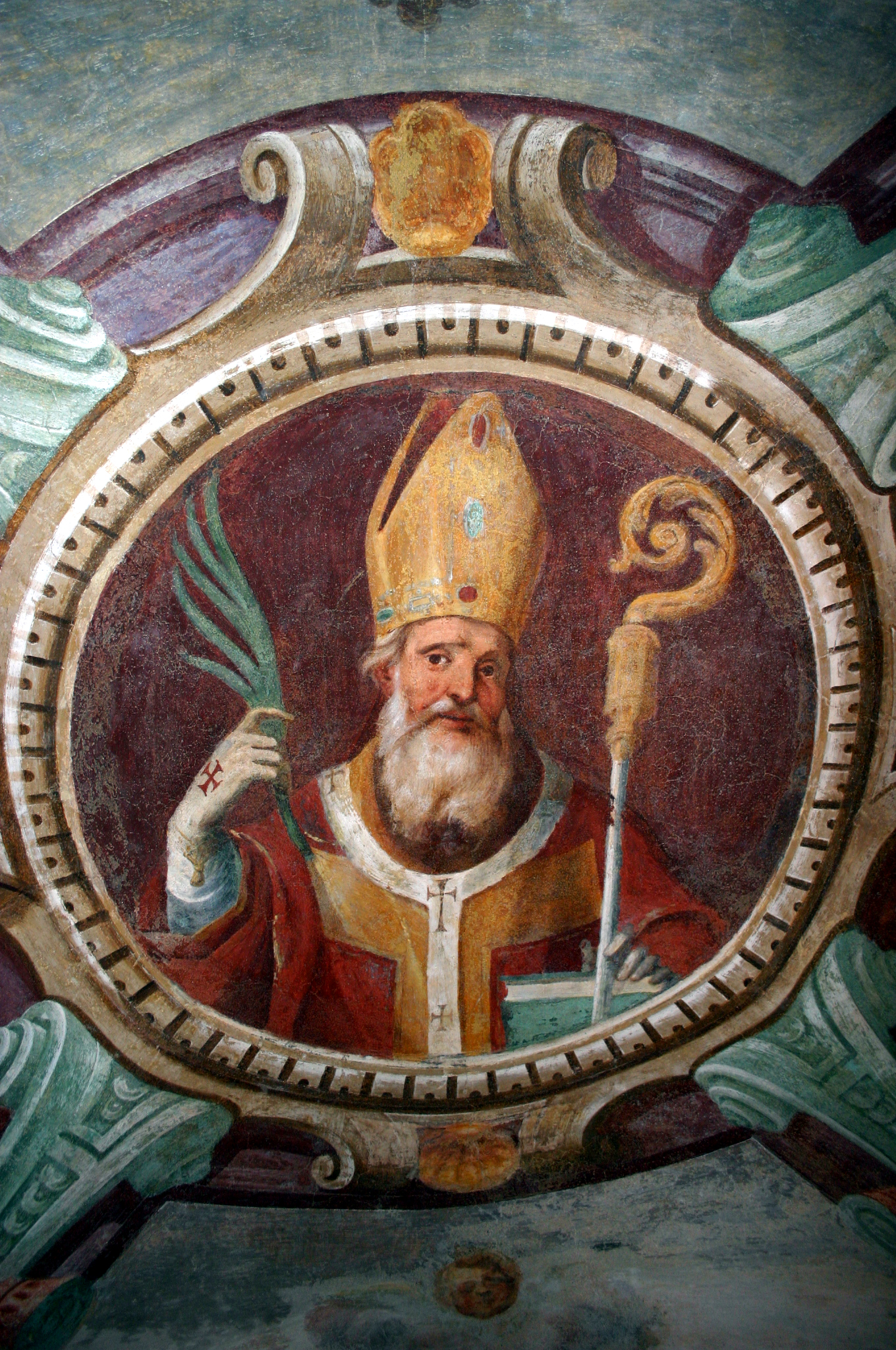
- Fresco of Saint Calimerius
- Church: Catholic Church
- In office: about 270 – 280
- Predecessor: Castritian
- Successor: Monas

Personal details
- Born: c. 3rd century AD Greece, Roman Empire
- Died: 280 AD Milan, Roman Italy, Roman Empire
- Buried: Milan Cathedral

Sainthood
- Feast day: July 31
- Venerated in: Catholic Church; Eastern Orthodox Church
- Patronage: invoked against drought
- Shrines: Basilica of Saint Calimerius, Milan

There is also a beatus named Calimerius of Montechiaro (c. 1430–1521).

Calimerius (Italian: Calimero, Byzantine Greek: Καλημέριος) (died 280 AD) was an early bishop of Milan. He is honoured as a Saint in the Catholic and Eastern Orthodox churches and his feast day is on July 31.

== Life ==
The only thing known for certain about him was that he was a bishop whose relics were conserved in the Basilica of Saint Calimerius in Milan, after his death. He was probably not a contemporary and disciple of Pope Telesphorus (2nd century), as is often stated, but lived in the third century, with an episcopate of 270–280.

== Legends ==
According to one version his legend, he was born to a noble Roman family, entered military service and reached the rank of officer when he was converted to Christianity by saints Faustinus and Jovita. According to another legend, he was born in Greece, and was educated at Rome. He was a disciple of Pope Telesphorus. He succeeded St. Castricianus (San Castriziano). He was ordained priest by Castricianus and served at the Basilica Fausta (now the church of Saints Vitalis and Agricola). At the death of Castricianus, he was elected bishop.

According to his legend, when he became bishop of Milan, he preached in the region and was killed during the persecutions of Christians by Commodus or Hadrian, by being flung headfirst into a well.

== Calimerius and the well ==
Calimerius' relics were exhumed in the eighth century by Bishop Tommaso Grassi of Milan. The urn and the relics were found submerged in water, perhaps due to the many underground channels that ran under the city. However, the fact that his relics were found this way led to the legend that Calimerius was flung into a well. In the eleventh century, the Datiana Historia, written by an anonymous author, states that Calimerius was flung into a well as revenge for having baptized so many pagans. The same source includes the detail that Calimerius was a Greek raised in Rome, as well as the fact that he was a disciple of Telesphorus, although both claims may be historically doubtful. Another legend states that he was a Roman of noble origin, who, after serving in the military, was converted by Saints Faustinus and Jovita and was elected bishop of Milan. The dates on a plaque of marble in the interior of the Cathedral of Milan state that his episcopate lasted from 139 to 192, but these dates, due to disputes with Rome, may have been falsified in the eleventh century in order to make the diocese of Milan appear to be more ancient than it actually was. Thus, it considered Saint Barnabas of the Apostolic Age as its first bishop in order to become more independent of Rome. As Hippolyte Delehaye writes, "To have lived amongst the Saviour's immediate following was ... honorable ... and accordingly old patrons of churches were identified with certain persons in the gospels or who were supposed to have had some part in Christ's life on earth."

== Veneration ==
Saint Ennodius, in an epigram, writes that the basilica of San Calimero was built in the fifth century to hold the relics of Calimerius.

The waters of a well said to have been the place of his death acquired special significance. Every July 31, his feast day, the sick would drink of this water. In times of drought, priests would put some of the miraculous water into a bottle and pour it over the fields.

There are basilicas dedicated to him at Pasturo and the Santuario della Madonna di San Calimero is located in Bolladello di Cairate.

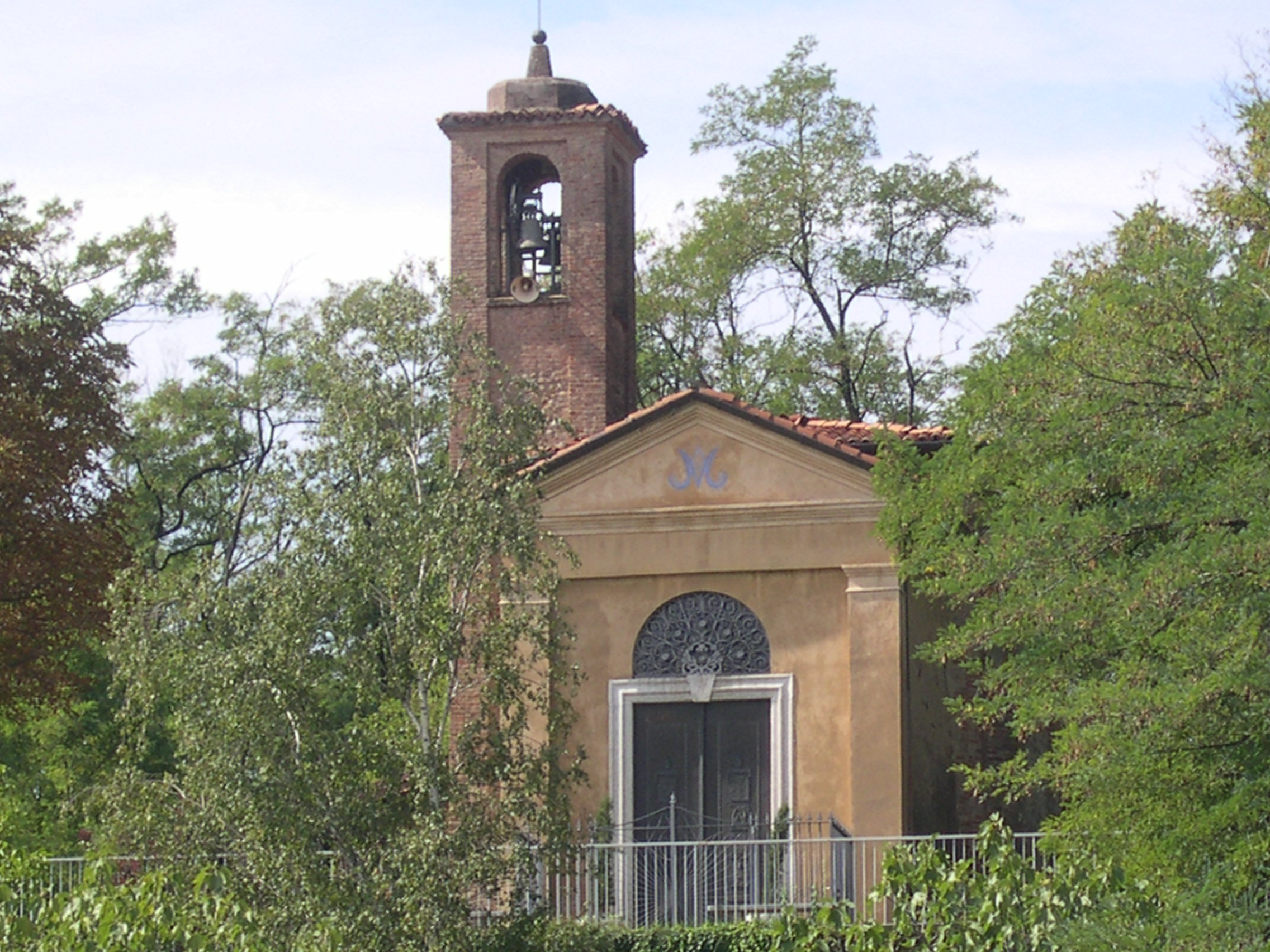
Sanctuary of San Calimero at Bolladello di Cairate

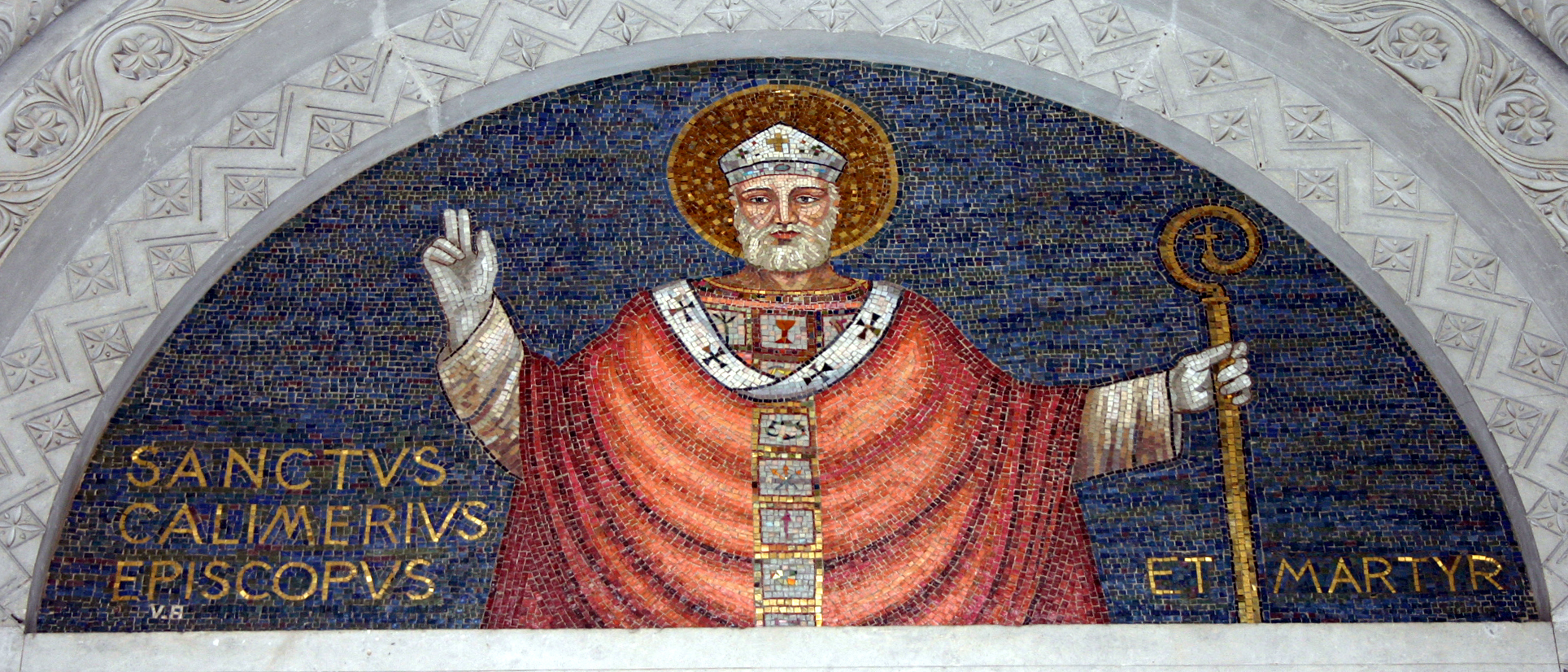
19th century mosaic of Calimerius

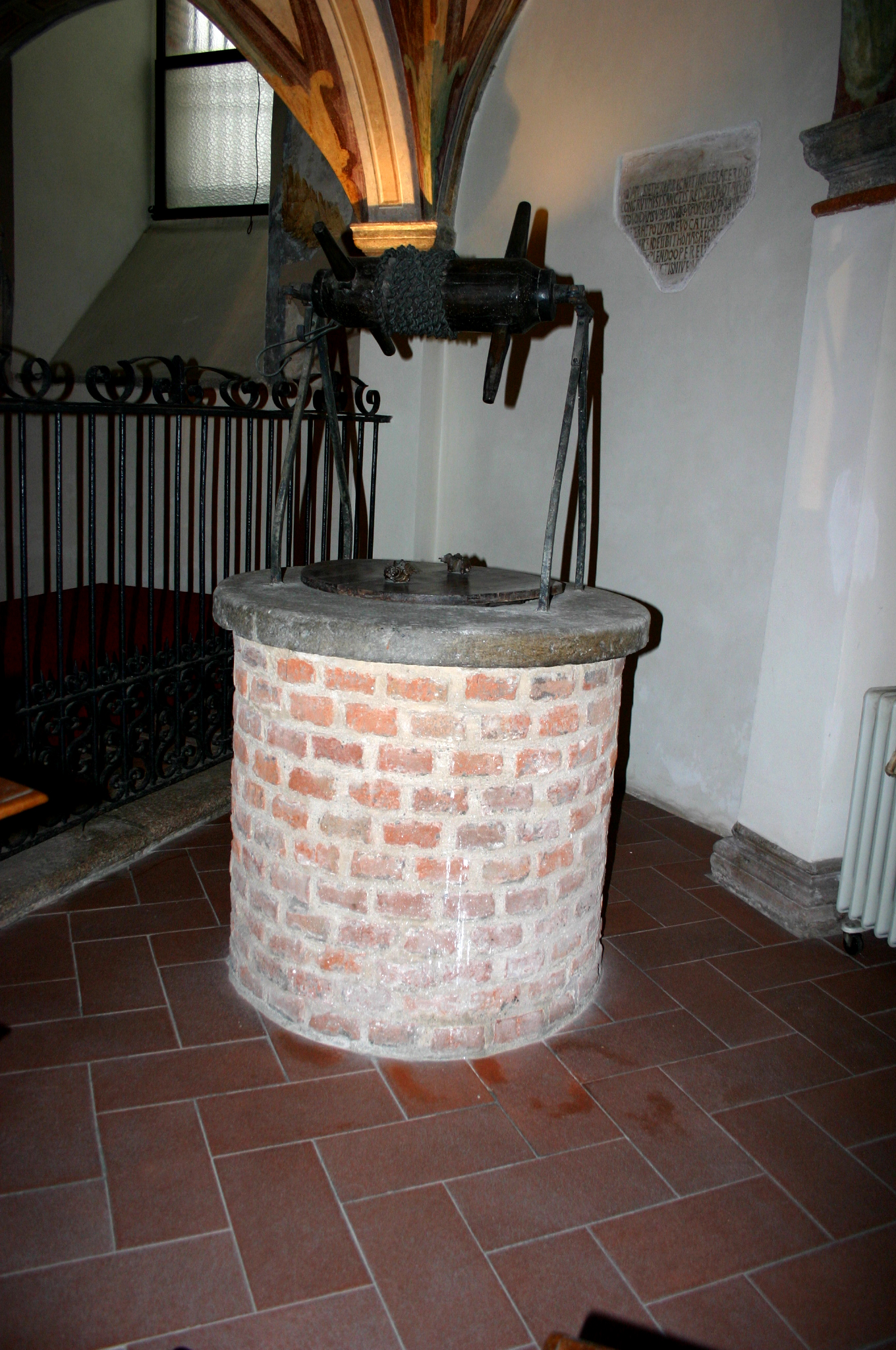
The purported well in which Calimerius is said to have been thrown. The water of this well was considered miraculous. Crypt of San Calimero.
