= Giovanni III Visconti =

Italian Catholic Archbishop of Milan

- Archbishop of Milan
- Installed: 1450
- Term ended: 9 March 1453
- Predecessor: Enrico Rampini
- Successor: Nicolò Amidano
- Previous posts: Archpriest of the Metropolitan Church of Milan; Commendatory Abbot of Morimondo Abbey

Personal details
- Born: Milan
- Died: 9 March 1453 Milan
- Denomination: Roman Catholic
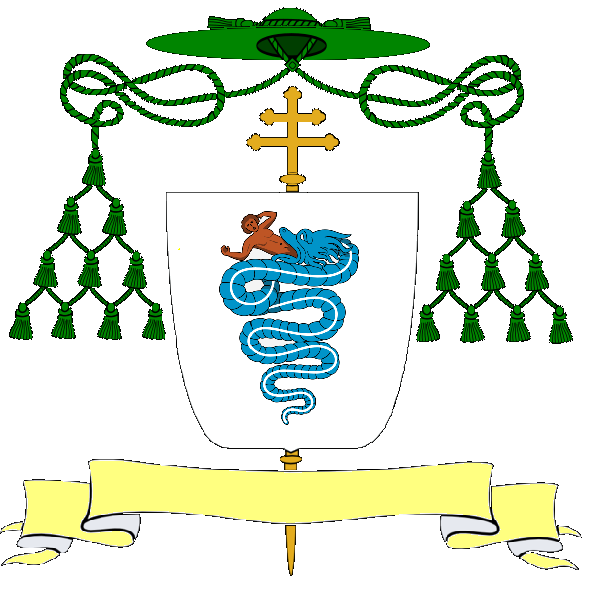
- Coat of arms

Giovanni III Visconti (unknown date at Milan - 9 March 1453 at Milan) was the Italian Catholic Archbishop of Milan.

== Biography ==
=== Origins and the disputed archbishopric ===
A member of the prestigious Visconti family, Giovanni III was directly related to other important bishops of Milan such as Giovanni and Ottone Visconti, his namesake and predecessors. Son of the general Vercellino Secondo Visconti of the Visconti di Somma and Giovanna Visconti, Giovanni was archpriest of the Metropolitan Chapter in 1402 and was first appointed archbishop of Milan in the years 1409-1417 by Pope Gregory XII during the Western Schism. The Council of Constance (1414-18) revoked this appointment. From that moment, other than his office as the commendatory abbot of Morimondo Abbey, he disappeared from the active religious scene until 1450.

=== Archbishop of Milan (1450-1453) ===
In early 1450, after the brief interlude of the Ambrosian Republic, Francesco Sforza, son-in-law of the late Duke Filippo Maria Visconti, conquered Milan. While attending the Jubilee of August 3, 1450, the previous Archbishop of Milan, Enrico Rampini, had died. Sforza secured Visconti's appointment from Pope Nicholas V to the Archbishop of Milan. During his brief tenure, Visconti reorganized Milan Cathedral's Chapter, including a fourth canon in the figure of the Provost.

Visconti especially promoted the work of the San Barnaba in Brolo Hospital, founded in 1145, which was the direct predecessor of the Ospedale Maggiore (Maggiore Hospital) in Milan. Because of a common agreement with Duke Sforza and a Papal bull of Niccolò V, Visconti assigned an annual sum of 810 gold ducats to be shared among the staff working there. Giovanni III Visconti died in Milan on March 9, 1453, and was buried in the cathedral.

== Coat-of-arms ==
Image
Blazon
Giovanni III Visconti
Archbishop of Milan

Silver to blue snake swaying on the pole and crowned with gold, swallowing a dark complexion (Visconti). The shield, attached to a patriarchal gold processional cross, placed on the pole, is stamped by a hat with cords and green tassels. The tassels, twelve in number, are arranged ten on each side, in five orders of 1, 2, 3, 4.

== Bibliography ==
- Cazzani, Eugenio; Majo, Angelo (1996). Vescovi e Arcivescovi di Milano [Bishops and Archbishops of Milan] (in Italian). Milano Milano: Massimo NED. p. 207. ISBN 978-88-7030-891-4. OCLC 797465268.
- Muratori, Lodovico Antonio (1773). Annali d'Italia dal principio dell' era volgare sino all' anno 1750 [Annals of Italy from the beginning of the vulgar era until the year 1750] (in Italian). Napoli: Nella stamperia di G. Gravier. OCLC 680278116.
- Palladini, Francesco (1834). Della elezione degli arcivescovi di Milano [Of the election of the archbishops of Milan] (in Italian). hdl:2027/nnc1.0035539461. OCLC 680435196.
- Vagliano, Giovanni Giuseppe (1715). Sommario delle vite ed azioni degli arcivescovi di Milano da S. Barnaba sino al governo presente (in Italian). Milano: M.A. Pandolfo Malatesta. hdl:0111/UIUCOCA:sommariodellevit00vagl. OCLC 842411923.
