= Archdiocese of Milan =

Prominent Latin Catholic ecclesiastical territory in Italy

Coordinates: 45°27′51.51″N 9°11′30.64″E

Archdiocese of Milan Archidioecesis Mediolanensis Arcidiocesi di Milano

Catholic
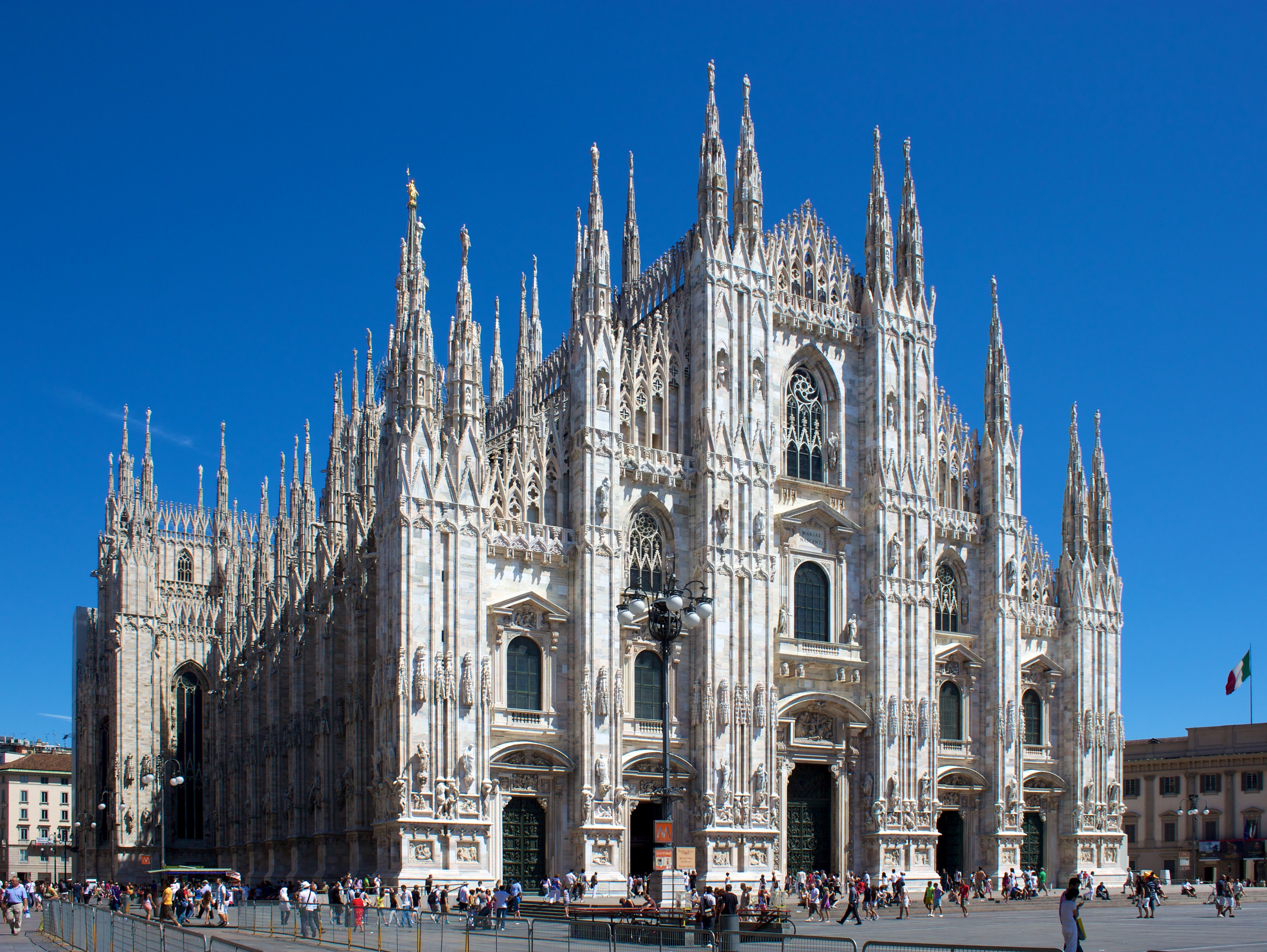
- Milan Cathedral

Location
- Country: Italy

Statistics
- Area: 4,243 km^{2} (1,638 sq mi)
- Population: Total; Catholics: (as of 2023); 5,647,000 (est.) ▲; 4,942,000 (est.) ▼
- Parishes: 1,107

Information
- Denomination: Catholic
- Sui iuris church: Latin Church
- Rite: Ambrosian Rite; Roman Rite
- Established: 1st century (diocese); 374 (archdiocese)
- Cathedral: Cattedrale di S. Maria Nascente
- Secular priests: 1,650 (diocesan) ▼719 (Religious Orders) ▼156 Permanent Deacons

Current leadership
- Pope: Leo XIV
- Archbishop: Mario Delpini
- Auxiliary Bishops: Franco Agnesi; Luca Raimondi; Giuseppe Natale Vegezzi
- Bishops emeritus: Angelo Scola; Erminio De Scalzi; Angelo Mascheroni

Map

Website
- chiesadimilano.it

The Archdiocese of Milan (Italian: Arcidiocesi di Milano; Latin: Archidioecesis Mediolanensis) is a Latin Church ecclesiastical territory or archdiocese of the Catholic Church in Italy which covers the areas of Milan, Monza, Lecco and Varese.

The Archdiocese of Milan is the metropolitan see of the ecclesiastical province of Milan, which includes the suffragan dioceses of Bergamo, Brescia, Como, Crema, Cremona, Lodi, Mantova, Pavia, and Vigevano. It has long maintained its own Latin liturgical rite usage, the Ambrosian rite, which is still used in the greater part of the diocesan territory.

Among its past archbishops, the better known are: Ambrose; Saint Carlo Cardinal Borromeo; Pope Pius XI; and Pope Paul VI.

Milan's archdiocese is the largest in Europe, and the one having the most priests in the world, with, as of 2021, 2,450 priests living in the diocese, among whom 1,712 are secular priests.

== History ==
According to the legend, the Gospel was brought to Milan by the apostle Barnabas, and the first Bishop of Milan, Anathalon, was a disciple of that apostle. But a diocese cannot have been established there, as such, before 200, as the dioceses of the church evolved from the civil (Roman) dioceses following the reforms of Emperor Diocletian, for the list of the bishops of Milan names only five predecessors of Mirocles, who participated at the Lateran council held in 313 in Rome. During the persecutions of the third and early fourth century, several Christians suffered martyrdom and were venerated at Milan: among them Gervasius and Protasius (first persecution of Diocletian), Victor, Nabor and Felix, and Nazarius and Celsus. The persecutions ended in 313 when the Emperors Constantine I and Licinius issued the Edict of Milan which proclaimed the religious toleration in the Roman Empire.

Among its bishops should be named Eustorgius I and Dionysius, who firmly opposed apostasy imposed by the Roman Emperor Constantius II; Dionysus was exiled to Cappadocia (355). The Arian Emperor Constans, employing violence, then imposed Auxentius on the diocese of Milan. His appointment was bitterly opposed by the orthodox Hilary of Poitiers, who wrote a diatribe In Constantiam, condemning the emperor's actions. Auxentius was deposed by a Roman synod of Pope Damasus I in 372. At the death of Auxentius, Ambrose was elected bishop by the people of Milan (374-397).

Among his successors was Bishop Dacius (c. 535-552). While Pope Vigilius was on his trip to Constantinople and staying in Sicily, from 545 to 546, he received information that Bishop Decius and some other bishops had broken communion with the patriarch of Constantinople, over the issue of the Three Chapters. In 537 and 538, he lived in Rome, having fled from Milan on account of the Gothic War. At some point between 537 and 546, Bishop Decius made a personal visit to Constantinople. He was in Constantinople again in 550, when he and Pope Vigilius engaged in conversations with the Emperor Justinian. He was in Constantinople with Pope Vigilius, when he died early in 552; his body was repatriated.

=== Lombards, Greeks, and others ===
During the Lombard invasion, many troubles were inflicted on the church in Milan. The Schism of the Three Chapters guaranteed autonomy of the Milanese Church for 38 years, since the Lombards were enemies of the Byzantines. At the siege of Milan by the Lombard Alboin, the Bishop Honoratus (568) sought refuge in Genoa, with a great number of his clergy, which returned to Milan only 70 years later under John the Good.

On 6 April 1027, Pope John XIX and a Roman council settled the long standing issue of the independence of the diocese of Milan from the aggressions of the diocese of Ravenna.

Archbishop Ariberto da Intimiano (1018–1045) was excommunicated and anathematized by Pope Benedict IX on 26 March 1038, due to his stubborn opposition to the Emperor Conrad II.

In the 10th century, the archbishops of Milan became a feudatory vassal of the Emperor extending his jurisdiction to all northwest Italy. The most distinguished of these was Ariberto da Intimiano (1018–45). As the power of the burghers grew, that of the archbishops waned, and with it the imperial authority which the prelate represented, and from the 12th century Milan became a Guelph town that fought the Emperor. The archbishop Ottone Visconti in the 13th-century caused himself to be proclaimed perpetual lord, thus putting an end to the Republic of Milan and establishing the power of the House of Visconti who ruled the Duchy of Milan from 1277 to 1447.

On 1 November 1535, Duke Francesco II Sforza died without heir, and the fief revereted to the sovereign, the Emperor Charles V, who had reconquered Milan from the French in 1525 at the Battle of Pavia. In 1540, he granted Milan to his son, Philip.

=== Attempts at reform ===
During the brief reign of Pope Stephen IX (1057–1058), who was the brother of the duke of Lorraine, Archbishop Guido of Milan held a synod in the diocese of Novara, in a place called ad Fontanetum, where the leaders of the Patari, Arialdus and Landulfus, were excommunicated. They had been promoting a reform of the clergy in the diocese, which was directed particularly against the widespread Milanese custom of clerical marriage. The uproar in Lombardy was so severe that Archbishop Guido travelled secretly to Rome, to obtain the active support of the pope. He was severely disappointed, as many in the papal court were committed reformers. Pope Stephen removed the excommunication of Arialdus.

At the accession of Pope Nicholas II in 1058, the people of Milan, at their own request, were sent an Apostolic Visitator, Cardinal Peter Damiani, to restore order in their church, which was filled with simony and priestly concubinage. Archbishop Guido da Velate (1045–1071) was summoned to the synod held by Pope Nicholas in Rome in April 1059. The principal topic of discussion was simony, and Guido was among many who were accused. He was able to escape from the attack. He was finally caught and, in c. 1064, he was suspended from office by Pope Alexander II (1061–1073); in early 1066, he was excommunicated.

After Archbishop Guido was excommunicated, the Emperor Henry IV attempted to take advantage of the situation and had his nominee, Gotofredo da Castiglione, a canon of the cathedral, elected Archbishop while Guido was still alive. Pope Alexander condemned his election.

==== Borromeo and the synod system ====
The figure who marked the modern history of the church of Milan was Charles Borromeo, archbishop of Milan from 1564 to 1584, who was a leading figure during the Counter-Reformation and was responsible for significant reforms in the Catholic Church. He held eleven diocesan synods: in August 1564, 4 August 1568, 1772, 16 November 1774, 1778, 1779,

Cardinal Carlo Borromeo also held six provincial synods, meeting in the cathedral of Milan. The bishops of the province, as well as the canons of the cathedrals and of the collegiate churches, were expected to attend. The first took place in 1565; the second in 1569; the third in 1573; the fourth in 1576; the fifth in 1579; the sixth in 1582; a seventh was planned, but he died in 1584. His immediate successor, Cardinal Gaspare Visconti (1584–1595), continued Borromeo's practice, with a diocesan synod of 1586, another in 1587, a third in 1589, and again in 1590, and in 1591, and finally a sixth in 1593.

His pastoral efforts were followed by his successors, such as his cousin, Cardinal Federico Borromeo (1595–1631), who held diocesan synods in 1596, 1602, 1603, 1604, 1606, 1608, 1611, 1613, 1614, 1622, and 1627. Cardinal Cesare Monti (1632–1650) in eighteen years held a diocesan synod in 1636, 1640, and 1650. Cardinal Alfonso Litta (1652–1679) in twenty-seven years held diocesan synods in 1658 and 1669. and Giuseppe Pozzobonelli (died 1783).

=== Chapter and Cathedral ===
The cathedral of Milan is dedicated to the Nativity of the Virgin Mary, It is served and administered by a corporation called the Chapter, which is composed of five dignities (the Archpriest, the Archdeacon, the Primicerius, the Provost, and the Deacon), of three personalities (the Theologus, the Penitentiarius, and the Doctor Prebendatus), and twenty-two canons ordinary.

Anselm da Baggio (Anselm of Lucca) had once been canon ordinary of the cathedral of Milan, before he was elected Pope Alexander II (1061–1073).

Archbishop Ottone Visconti (1262–1295) attended the Second Council of Lyon in 1274 and 1275, returning to Italy in the company of Pope Gregory X. Pope Gregory visited Milan in November 1275. On 20 April 1277, Archbishop Otto decreed that all canons ordinary of the cathedral Chapter had to be members of the nobility. As temporal sovereign of Milan, Archbishop Ottone established a tribunal of six members in 1282, to preside over the affairs and common defense of Milan. In 1284, Otto became the first archbishop of Milan to refer to his tenure dei gratia et Apostolicae Sedis ('thanks to God and the Pope'). Later in the year, he entered into a league with Rudolf, King of the Romans, who provided him with troops to defend Milan. In 1287, he arranged an alliance of Milan, Pavia, Piacenza, and Brescia with Amadeus of Savoy.

By order of the Executive Directory of the Cisalpine Republic, the Chapter of the cathedral of Milan was abolished on 19 May 1798. In the Concordat of 16 September 1803, signed by Pope Pius VII and Napoleon Bonaparte, First Consul of the French Republic and President of the Italian Republic, the Chapter was restored.

Napoleon Bonaparte, Emperor of the French, was crowned king of Italy, the successor state of the Italian Republic, in the cathedral of Milan, by Cardinal Giovanni Battista Caprara, on 23 May 1805.

In the 20th century, two Cardinal Archbishops of Milan were elected to the papacy: in 1922, Cardinal Achille Ratti was elected as Pope Pius XI, and in 1963 Cardinal Giovanni Battista Montini was elected as Pope Paul VI. The church of Milan was governed from 1979 to 2002 by Cardinal Carlo Maria Martini, who had been a favorite of the Catholic left.

=== Seminaries ===
The Major Seminary of the archdiocese has its principal seat in Venegono Inferiore. The minor seminary is located in Seveso. On 9 September 1566, Cardinal Carlo Borromeo entered into an agreement with the Society of Jesus (Jesuits) to staff his new seminary, beginning in 1567 and continuing for two years beyond his lifetime. He also issued detailed instructions for the conduct and education of the members of the seminary and its students.

== Bishops and archbishops ==
A list of the bishops and archbishops of Milan is engraved on a plaque in the South nave of the Cathedral of Milan, but that list contains historical errors. The following list is based on the compilation of Eugenio Cazzani, but his list contains historical errors.

=== Late antiquity ===
○ [ Barnabas the Apostle (1st century) ]

- Anathalon
- Caius
- Castricianus
- Calimerus (about 270–280)
- Monas (283–313?)
- Mirocles (313–316?)
- Maternus (316–328?)
- Protasius (328–343?)
- Eustorgius I (343–349?)
- Dionysius (349–355)

○ [ Auxentius (355–374) ], Arian, intrusus

- Ambrose (374–397)
- Simplicianus (397–400)
- Venerius (400–408)
- Marolus (408–423)
- Martinianus (423–435)
- Glycerius (436–438)
- Lazarus (438–449)
- Eusebius (449–462)
- Gerontius (462–465)
- Benignus (465–472)
- Senator (472–475)
- Theodorus I (475–490)
- Laurentius (I) (490–512)
- Eustorgius II (512–518)
- Magnus (518–530?)
- Dacius (530–552)
- Vitale (552–555)
- Ausanus (556–559?) schismatic

=== Genoa period ===
- Honoratus (560–571?)
- Frontone (571–573?)
- Laurentius (II) (573–592)
- Constantius (593–600)
- Deodatus (601–628)
- Asterius (629–639)
- Forte (639–641)

Sede vacante

=== Middle Ages ===
==== 641 to 1100 ====
- Joannes Bonus (c. 649–660)
- Antoninus (660?–661?)
- Maurilius (671)
- Ampelius (671–676)
- Mansuetus (676–685)
- Benedict (685–732)
- Theodorus II (732–746)
- Natalis (746–747)
- Arifred (747–748)
- Stabile (748–750)
- Leto (751–755)
- Tommaso (755–783)
- Peter (784–803)
- Odelperto (803–813)
- Anselm I (813–818)
- Buono (818–822)
- Angilbert I (822–823)
- Angilberto II Pusterla (824–859)
- Tadone (863–868)
- Ansperto Confalonieri of Biassono (868–881)
- Anselmo II Capra (882–896)
- Landulf I (896–899)
- Andrea of Canciano (899–906)
- Aicone (906–918)
- Gariberto of Besana (918–921)
- Lambert (921–931)
- Elduin (931–936)
- Arderico (936–948)
- Adelman (948–953)
  - Manasses of Arles
- Walpert (953–970)
- Arnulf I (970–974)
- Gotofredo I (974–979)
- Landulf II of Carcano (980–998)
- Arnolfo II da Arsago (998–1018)
- Ariberto da Intimiano (1018–1045)
- Guido da Velate (1045–1071)
- Atto (1072–1075)
  - Gotofredo da Castiglione (1070–1075), intrusus
- Tedald (1075–1080)
- Anselmo III da Rho (1086–1093)
- Arnolfo III (1093–1097)
- Anselmo IV da Bovisio (1097–1101)

==== 1100 to 1500 ====
- Grossolano (1102–1112)
- Giordano da Clivio (1112–1120)
- Olrico da Corte (1120–1126)
- Anselmo della Pusterla (1126–1135)
- Robaldo (1135–1145)
- Umberto da Pirovano (1146–1166)
- Galdino della Sala (1166–1176)
- Algisio da Pirovano (1176–1185)
- Umberto II Crivelli (1185–1187)
- Milone da Cardano (1187–1195)
- Umberto III da Terzago (1195–1196)
- Filippo I da Lampugnano (1196–1206)
- Uberto da Pirovano (1206–1211)
- Gerardo da Sesso, O.Cist. (1211–1212)
- Enrico da Settala (1213–1230)
- Guglielmo da Rizolio (1230–1241)
- Leon da Perego (1241–1257)

Sede vacante (1257–1262)

- Ottone Visconti (1262–1295)
- Ruffino da Frisseto (1295–1296)
- Francesco da Parma (1296–1308)
- Cassone della Torre (1308–1317)
- Aicardo da Intimiano (1317–1339)
- Giovanni Visconti (1342–1354)
- Roberto Visconti (1354–1361)
- Guglielmo II della Pusterla (1361–1370)
- Simon da Borsano (1370–1380)
- Antonio de' Saluzzi (1380–1401)
- Pietro II di Candia (1402–1410)
- Francesco II Crippa (1409–1414)
- Bartolommeo Capra (1414–1433)
- Francesco Piccolpasso (1433–1443)
- Enrico II Rampini (1443–1450)
- Giovanni III Visconti (1450–1453)
- Nicolò Amidano (1453–1454)

○ [ Timoteo Maffei (1454) ]

- Gabriele Sforza, O.E.S.A. (1454–1457)
- Carlo I da Forlì (1457–1461)
- Cardinal Stefano Nardini (1461–1484)
- Cardinal Giovan IV Arcimboldi (1484–1488) (absentee)
- Guido Antonio Arcimboldi (1488–1497) (absentee)
- Ottaviano Arcimboldi (1497) (absentee)

=== Modern period ===
==== 1497 to 1801 ====
○ Cardinal Ippolito I d'Este (1497–1520) Administrator

- Cardinal Ippolito II d'Este (1520–1550) Administrator (absentee)
- Giovanni Angelo Arcimboldi (1550–1555) (absentee)
- Cardinal Ippolito II d'Este (1555–1556) (absentee)
- Filippo Archinto (1556–1558)
- Sede vacante (1558–1564)
- Cardinal Carlo Borromeo (1564–1584)
- Cardinal Gaspare Visconti (1584–1595)
- Cardinal Federico I Borromeo (1595–1631)
- Cardinal Cesare Monti (1632–1650)
- Cardinal Alfonso Litta (1652–1679)
- Cardinal Federico Visconti (1681–1693)
- Cardinal Federico Caccia (1693–1699)
- Cardinal Giuseppe Archinto (1699–1712)
- Cardinal Benedetto II Erba Odescalchi (1712–1737)
- Cardinal Carlo Gaetano Stampa (1737–1742)
- Cardinal Giuseppe Pozzobonelli (1743–1783)
- Filippo Maria Visconti (1784–1801)

==== Since 1801 ====
- Cardinal Giovanni Battista Caprara (1802–1810)

Sede vacante

- Cardinal Carlo Gaetano Gaisruck (1816–1846)
- Bartolomeo Carlo Romilli (1847–1859)
- Paolo Angelo Ballerini (1859–1867)
- Luigi Nazari di Calabiana (1867–1893)
- Cardinal Andrea Ferrari (May 21, 1894 – February 2, 1921)
- Cardinal Ambrogio Damiano Ratti (June 13, 1921–February 6, 1922), elected Pope Pius XI
- Cardinal Eugenio Tosi (1922–1929)
- Cardinal Ildefonso Schuster, O.S.B.Casin. (1929–1954)
- Cardinal Giovanni Battista Montini (November 1, 1954–June 19, 1963), elected Pope Paul VI
- Cardinal Giovanni Colombo (August 10, 1963 – December 29, 1979)
- Cardinal Carlo Maria Martini (December 29, 1979 – June 11, 2002)
- Cardinal Dionigi Tettamanzi (July 11, 2002 – June 28, 2011)
- Cardinal Angelo Scola (June 28, 2011 – July 7, 2017)
- Mario Delpini (September 9, 2017 – Present)

== Present leadership ==
The current Metropolitan Archbishop of Milan, Archbishop Mario Enrico Delpini, was appointed by Pope Francis on 7 July 2017. Delpini succeeded the retiring Cardinal Angelo Scola. He served previously as the Vicar-General and the Auxiliary Bishop of Milan.

Archbishop Delpini is assisted by three Auxiliary Bishops: Franco Agnesi, Giovanni Raimondi, and Giuseppe Vegezzi. The resignations of Bishops Luigi Stucchi and Ermino De Scalzi were accepted by Pope Francis on 30 April 2020. That same day, he appointed Giovanni Raimondi and Giuseppe Vegezzi as auxiliary bishops. On 1 May 2022, the former Auxiliary Bishop Paolo Martinelli was appointed Vicar Apostolic for Southern Arabia.

== Parishes ==
The 1,104 parishes all fall within the region of Lombardy. They are divided between the Province of Bergamo, the Province of Como, the Province of Lecco, the Province of Milan, the Province of Pavia, and the Province of Varese.

== See also ==
- Ambrosian chant
- Ambrosian Rite
- Cathedral of Milan
- Angelo Scola
- Early Christian churches in Milan

== Sources ==
=== Episcopal lists ===
- Eubel, Conradus, ed. (1913). Hierarchia catholica (in Latin). Vol. 1 (Tomus 1) (second ed.). Münster: Libreria Regensbergiana. pp. 332–333.Archived.
- Eubel, Conradus, ed. (1914). Hierarchia catholica (in Latin). Vol. 2 (Tomus 2) (second ed.). Münster: Libreria Regensbergiana. p. 188.. Archived.
- Eubel, Conradus, ed. (1923). Hierarchia catholica (in Latin). Vol. 3 (Tomus 3) (second ed.). Münster: Libreria Regensbergiana. p. 240.. Archived.
- Gauchat, Patritius (Patrice) (1935). Hierarchia catholica. Vol. Tomus IV (1592-1667). Münster: Libraria Regensbergiana.
- Ritzler, Remigius; Sefrin, Pirminus (1952). Hierarchia catholica medii et recentis aevi. Vol. Tomus V (1667-1730). Patavii: Messagero di S. Antonio.
- Ritzler, Remigius; Sefrin, Pirminus (1958). Hierarchia catholica medii et recentis aevi. Vol. Tomus VI (1730-1799). Patavii: Messagero di S. Antonio.
- Ritzler, Remigius; Sefrin, Pirminus (1968). Hierarchia Catholica medii et recentioris aevi (in Latin). Vol. VII (1800–1846). Monasterii: Libreria Regensburgiana.
- Remigius Ritzler; Pirminus Sefrin (1978). Hierarchia catholica Medii et recentioris aevi (in Latin). Vol. VIII (1846–1903). Il Messaggero di S. Antonio.
- Pięta, Zenon (2002). Hierarchia catholica medii et recentioris aevi (in Latin). Vol. IX (1903–1922). Padua: Messagero di San Antonio. ISBN 978-88-250-1000-8.

=== Studies ===
- Ambrosioni, A. (1988), ‘Gli arcivescovi di Milano e la nuova coscienza cittadina’ (in Italian). In L’evoluzione delle città italiane nell’ XI secolo, ed. R. Bordone and J. Jarnut (Annali dell’ Istituto storico italo-germanico 25), pp. 193–222.
- Boito, Camillo & Salveraglio, Filippo (1889). Il duomo di Milano e i disegni per la sua facciata. (in Italian). Milano: Luigi Marchi 1889.
- Cappelletti, Giuseppe (1856). Le chiese d'Italia dalla loro origine sino ai nostri giorni (in Italian). Vol. undecimo (11). Venice: G. Antonelli. pp. 35–305.
- Castiglioni, Carlo (1948). La Chiesa milanese durante il Seicento. (in Italian). Milano: La Famiglia Meneghina, 1948.
- Castiglioni, Carlo (1954). "Gli Ordinari della Metropolitana attraverso i secoli," (in Italian). In Memorie storiche della Diocesi di Milano. Vol. 1. Milano: Biblioteca Ambrosiana, 1954, pp. 11-56. [Canons of the cathedral Chapter]
- Cowdrey, H. E. J. (1968) "The papacy, the Patarenes and the church of Milan," in: Transactions of the Royal Historical Society fifth series Vol. 18 (1968), pp. 25–48.
- Kehr, Paul Fridolin (1902). "Papsturkunden in Mailand," (in German). In: Nachrichten von der Königlich Gesellschaft der Wissenschaften zu Göttingen. Philologisch-historische Klasse vol. 1 (1902), pp. 67-129.
- Kehr, Paul Fridolin (1913). Italia pontificia Vol. VI. pars i. (in Latin). Berolini: Weidmann. pp. 24-119.
- Lanzoni, Francesco (1927). Le diocesi d'Italia dalle origini al principio del secolo VII (an. 604). Faenza: F. Lega. (in Italian) Pp. 996-1032.
- Majo, Angelo (ed.). Dizionario della chiesa ambrosiana. (in Italian). 6 vols. Milano: Nuove Edizioni Duomo 1993.
- Marcora, Carlo (1959). "Serie cronologica dei vicari generali della diocesi di Milano dal 1210 al 1930," (in Italian). In: Memorie storiche per la diocesi di Milano Vol. 6 (Milano 1959), pp. 252-282.
- Marcora, Carlo (1960). "La Chiesa Milanese nel decennio 1550-1560," (in Italian and Latin). In Memorie storiche della Diocesi di Milano Vol. 7 (Milano: Biblioteca Ambrosiana, 1960), pp. 254-501.
- Sala, Aristide (1854, 1855). Documenti per In storia della Diocesi di Milano. (in Italian and Latin) Milano: Pugliani 1854. Volume 2 (Milano Pugliani 1855).
- Savio, Fedele (1904). "La «Datiana Historia», o vita dei primi vescovi di Milano," (in Italian). In Rivista di scienze storiche Vol. 1 (1904), pp. 270-282; 385-397; 480-489.
- Savio, Fedele (1913). Gli antichi vescovi d'Italia dalle origini al 1300 descritti per regioni: La Lombardia, Parte 1: Milano. (in Italian). Firenze: Libreria Editrice Fiorentina, 1913.
- Saxius, Iosephus & Oltrocchi, Balthasar (1755). Archiepiscoporum mediolanensium series historico-chronologica ad criticae leges, et veterum monumentorum fidem illustrata. (in Latin). Volume 1. Milan: Regia Curia 1755. Volume 2 (c. 750–1370).
- Ughelli, Ferdinando ; Coleti, Nicola (1719). Italia sacra, sive De episcopis Italiæ, et insularum adjacentium (in Latin). Vol. 4 (Tomus quartus). Venice: apud Sebastianum Coleti. pp. 1–281.
- Vigotti, G. (1987). Papi, cardinali, arcivescovi e vescovi milanesi. (in Italian). Milano, NED, 1987.

==== External links ====
- Benigni, Umberto. "Milan, Diocese of (Mediolanensis)," in: The Catholic Encyclopedia Volume 10 (New York: The encyclopedia Press 1911), pp. 298-302.
- Cheney, David M. Catholic-Hierarchy.org. "Archdiocese of Milano {Milan}"; retrieved: 23 May 2026.
- Diocesi di Milano. Arcivescovo. "Cronologia dei Vescovi di Milano: Vescovi nella storia (sec. III-X). Serie cronologica dei Vescovi ambrosiani (III-X secolo)"; retrieved: 23 May 2026.
- Diocesi di Milano. Arcivescovo. "Cronologia dei Vescovi di Milano: Vescovi nella storia (sec. III-X). Serie cronologica dei Vescovi ambrosiani (XI-XXI secolo)"; retrieved: 30 May 2026.
- News from the Archdiocese of Milan
