= Cristoforo Moretti =

Italian painter

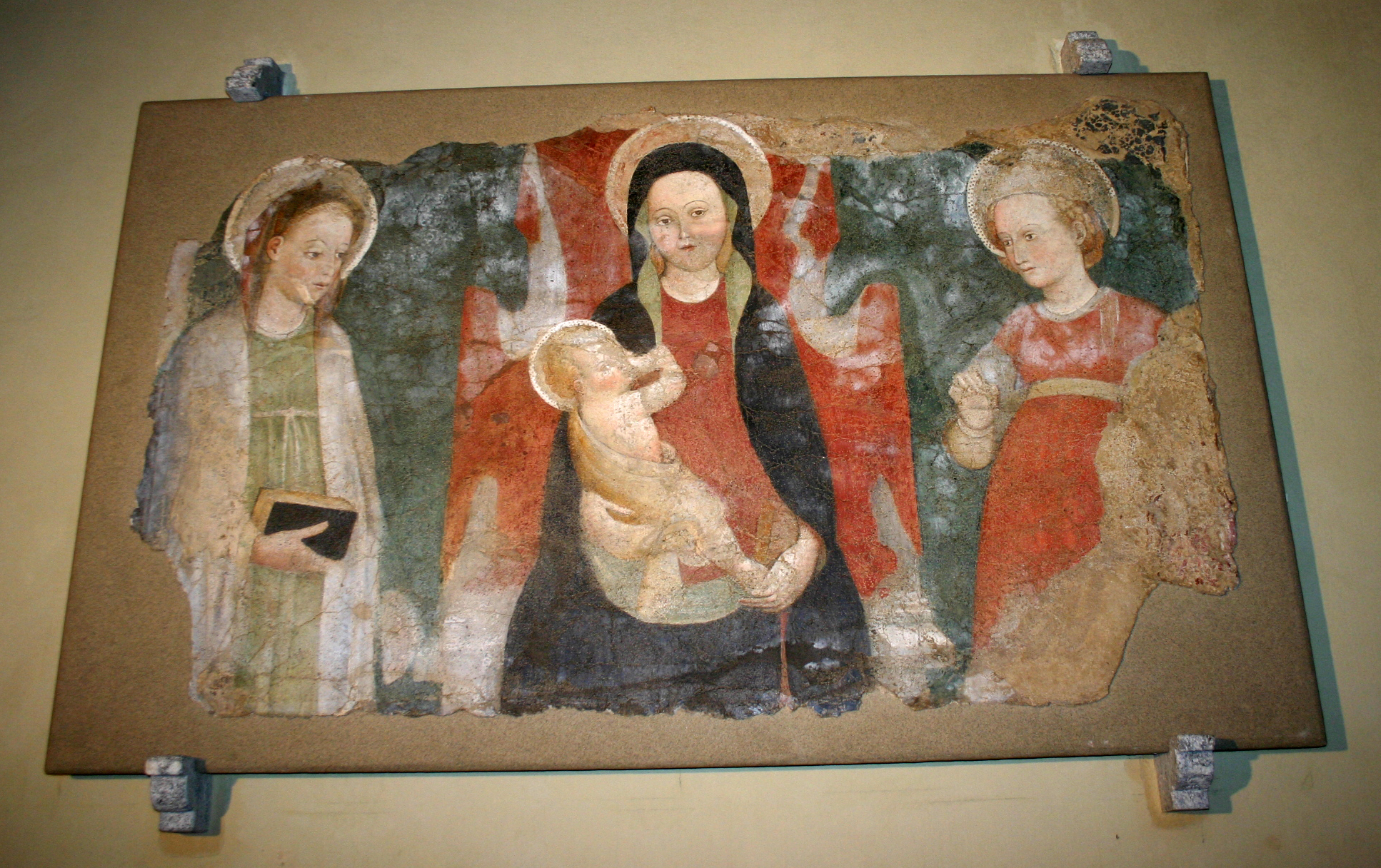
Madonna and Child between two female saints. Fresco, attributed to Moretti, from the apse of S. Calimero, Milan.

Cristoforo Moretti (documented in Lombardy and Piedmont 1451 – 1475) was a Lombard painter of the quattrocento who worked in a late International Gothic style very similar to that of Michelino da Besozzo’s last period. Few of the unsigned works later attributed to him are attributed with perfect certainty.

== Biography ==
Born in Soncino in the Province of Cremona, he is first recorded in 1451, working for the Borromeos in Milan. Between then and 1475 he is found variously in Milan, in Genoa, in Turin, in Casale, where he decorated the chapel of the Paleologi castle, and in Vercelli. (It seems that he was expelled from Milan in 1462, accused of having defamed the wife of Bianca Maria Visconti’s doctor.)

He is documented as part of a team of artists, including Vincenzo Foppa and Giovanni Battista Montorfano, forming an estimate for the paintings of Stefano dei Fedeli in a chapel of the Castle of Milan.

His best-known work, and the only one surviving to bear his signature, is probably the polyptych painted for the chapel of Sant’Aquilino next to the Milanese church of S. Lorenzo Maggiore. The work was subsequently broken up and dispersed, but most of its constituent parts were identified by Roberto Longhi in 1928. Three panels, depicting the Virgin and Child enthroned flanked by Saints Lawrence and Genesius of Rome (the latter playing a rebec), are today in the Museo Poldi Pezzoli in Milan. The whereabouts of the panel portraying Saint Peter the Martyr are unknown; however, a fragment of that with Saint Lucy is in the Longhi Foundation in Florence, and part of the predella, again showing Genesius, is conserved in Bologna.
