= Caius (bishop of Milan) =

3rd century bishop of Milan and saint

- Bishop of Milan
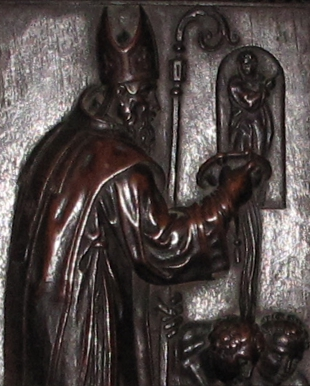
- Church: Great Church
- In office: early 3rd-century
- Predecessor: Anathalon
- Successor: Castritian

Personal details
- Born: c. 3rd century AD
- Died: c. 3rd century AD Milan, Roman Italy, Roman Empire

Sainthood
- Feast day: 27 September
- Venerated in: Eastern Orthodox Church; Catholic Church

Caius (or Gaius, Italian: Caio) was Bishop of Milan in early 3rd-century. He is considered by the Orthodox tradition the first Bishop of Milan in the 1st century. He is honoured as a saint in the Eastern Orthodox Church and the Roman Catholic Church and his feast day is on 27 September.

== Life ==
Almost nothing is known about the life and the episcopate of Caius, except that he was bishop of Milan in early 3rd-century, that he died on the 26 September and that his corpse was allegedly buried in a cemetery in the area of the Basilica Naboriana, now demolished. His relics were later translated into the near Basilica of Sant'Ambrogio.

Middle age texts, such as the Historia Dataria dated 11th-century, add biographic details which are to be considered legendary, such as his presence in Rome at the martyrdom of Saint Peter and Saint Paul and the conversion by him of Saints Vitalis, Valeris and Gervasius and Protasius.
