= John the Good (bishop of Milan) =

Archbishop of Milan from c. 641 to 669

- Archbishop of Milan
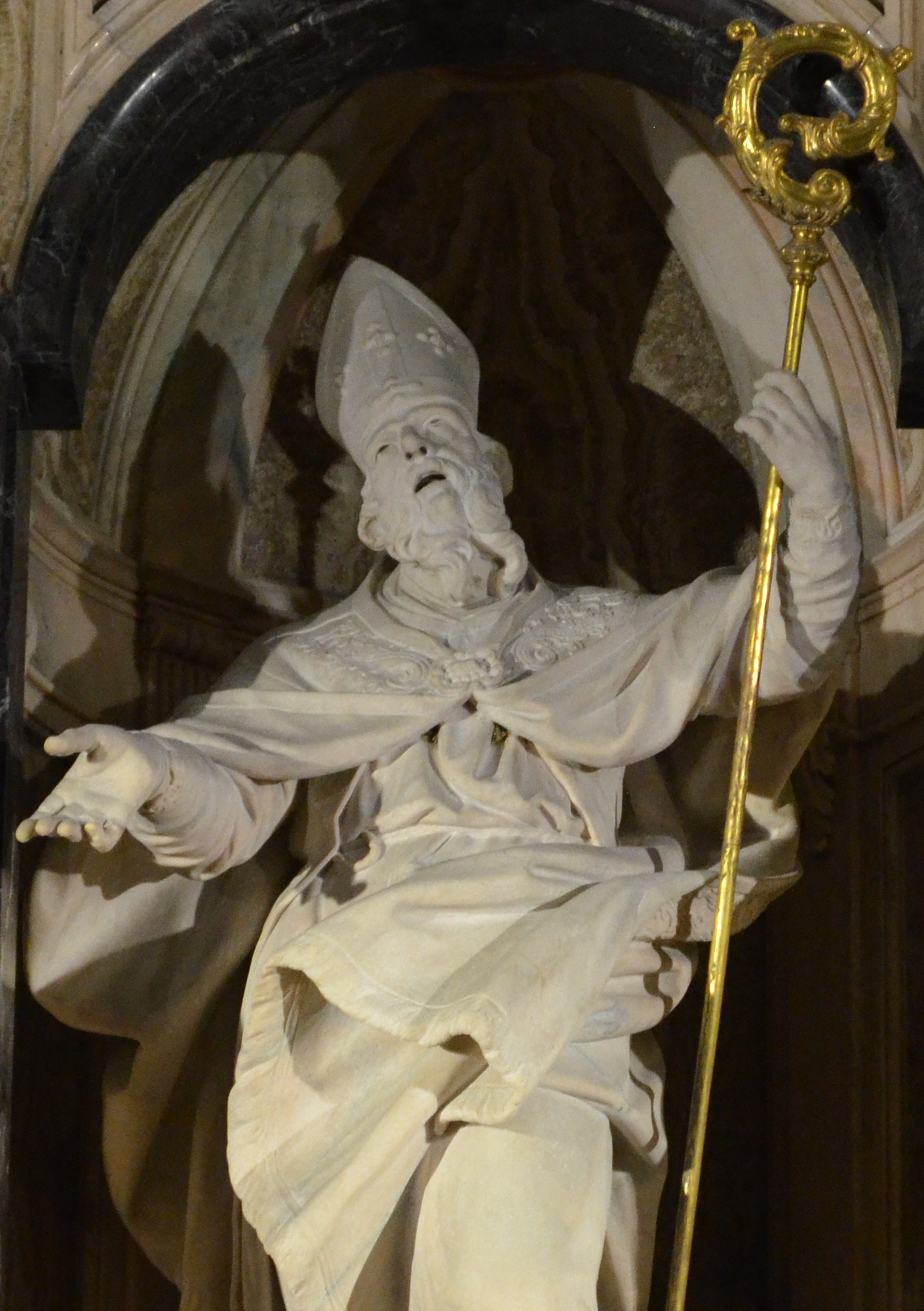
- Appointed: c. 641
- Term ended: c. 660
- Predecessor: Forte
- Successor: Antonino

Personal details
- Born: Recco
- Died: 669

Sainthood
- Feast day: 2 January (Roman Catholic Church); 10 January (Eastern Orthodox Church); 15 January (Ambrosian Rite)
- Venerated in: Roman Catholic Church; Eastern Orthodox Church
- Patronage: Milan, Italy

John the Good (Latin: Ioannes Bonus, Italian: Giovanni Bono or Buono), also known as John Camillus, was Archbishop of Milan from c. 641 to 669. He is honoured as a saint in the Eastern Orthodox Church and Roman Catholic Church.

== Life ==
The reign of John the Good is remembered for the return of the bishop to the town of Milan after an exile of more than 70 years. Actually in 569, the Lombards invaded Northern Italy and conquered its center, Milan, which was recovering from the terrible Gothic War. The bishop of Milan, Honoratus escaped to Genoa and Honoratus' successors remained in Genoa. Genoa was then a suffragan diocese of Milan but still under the control of the Byzantine Empire.

John the Good was born in the diocese of Genoa in the village of Recco (although the nearby town of Camogli also claims to be his birthplace). It is not exactly known when he became bishop of Milan, but it is believed that his election was in consequence of the 641 conquest of Genoa by the King of the Lombards Rothari. John as bishop returned to reside in Milan.

In 649, John was invited to participate to the Lateran Council, but he arrived in Rome when the council had already ended. He still however subscribed to all the documents issued by the council.

There are two main sources for John's life: the Catalogue of the Bishops of Milan (dated from about the 10th century) and a poem (Italian: Carme) in his honor, which can be dated from the 11th to the 13th century. According to this carme, John was distinguished for his generosity and charity, from which he was given the sobriquet the Good (Latin: Bonus). Also according to the carme, he accomplished miracles, he moved some of the relics of Saint Syrus of Genoa to Desio which he erected as ecclesiastical/administrative territory (Pievan Church) and he died in 669 leaving all his properties, including estates in the area of Genoa, to the Church of Milan. The 669 as date of his death is however not coherent with the catalogue, which suggests a ten years reign, i.e. a death no later than the 659.

John died on 2 January according to the Catalogue, or on 10 January according to the carme. The latter date became his initial feast day, and it is still his feast day in the Eastern Orthodox Church to this day. Today, his feast is celebrated on 2 January (or 15 January in the cathedral of Milan, together with all the canonised bishops of Milan on 25 September).

The body of John was initially buried in the little church of Saint Michael in Domo in Milan and the first survey on his relics was made by archbishop Aribert (1018–1045). On 24 May 1582, shortly before the demolition of the Church of St. Michael, cardinal Carlo Borromeo translated the body of John to the south transept of the cathedral of Milan, where it is still venerated. The body of the saint is 1.90 metres (6 ft 3 in) in height.
