= Paolo Angelo Ballerini =

Italian priest, Archbishop of Milan and Patriarch of Alexandria

Servant of God Paolo Angelo Ballerini
- Archbishop Emeritus of Milan
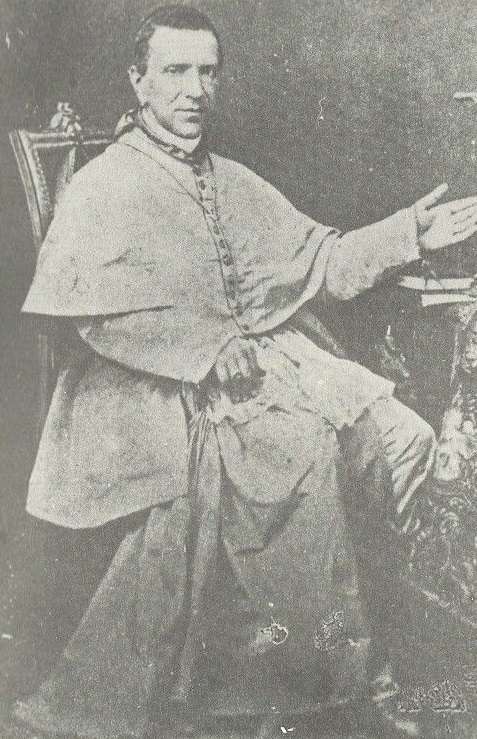
- Photography of Archbishop Ballerini
- Church: Roman Catholic Church
- Archdiocese: Milan
- See: Milan
- Appointed: 20 June 1859
- Term ended: 27 March 1867
- Predecessor: Bartolomeo Carlo Romilli
- Successor: Luigi Nazari di Calabiana
- Other post: Latin Patriarch of Alexandria (1867–1897)

Orders
- Ordination: 16 July 1837 by Guilelmus Zerbi
- Consecration: 8 December 1860 by Carlo Caccia Dominioni

Personal details
- Born: 14 September 1814 Milan, Lombardy, Kingdom of Lombardy–Venetia
- Died: 27 March 1897 (aged 82) Seregno, Monza e Brianza, Lombardy, Kingdom of Italy
- Buried: Seregno, Italy

Paolo Angelo Ballerini (14 September 1814 – 27 March 1897) was an Italian prelate who was named by Pope Pius IX as the Archbishop of Milan. He also served as the Latin Patriarch of Alexandria. His cause of beatification has been opened, thus titling him a Servant of God.

== Life ==
Ballerini was born in Milan in 1814, at the time, part of the Kingdom of Italy. In 1837 he was ordained as a priest for his native archdiocese and then in December 1857 he was named vicar general of the archdiocese. In the early days of 1858, Archbishop Romilli suffered a stroke so Ballerini's duties in the management of the archdiocese were increased due to the critical condition of archbishop Romilli.

=== Archbishop of Milan ===
In May 1859 Romilli died so following the Concordat of 1855 the Austrian emperor suggested Ballerini, a staunch conservative, as Archbishop of Milan and Pope Pius IX accepted soon. The Italian government, that had taken possession of Milan and Lombardy after the Second Italian War of Independence, refused to recognize Ballerini as archbishop because he opposed the cause of Italian reunification.

Ballerini was unable to take possession of his see as archbishop but Auxiliary bishop Carlo Caccia Dominioni governed the archdiocese. In October 1866 bishop Caccia di Dominioni died and the chapter of the Milan cathedral named Filippo Carcano as vicar of the archbishop; Ballerini did not agree with this decision so in order to avoid other problems pope Pius IX named Luigi Nazari di Calabiana as Archbishop of Milan and Ballerini was named as Latin Patriarch of Alexandria. The former archbishop of Milan participated in the First Vatican Council, where he supported the dogma of papal infallibility.

Ballerini spent his later life in Seregno, where he died in 1897.

=== Cause of beatification ===
The Archdiocese of Milan opened his cause of beatification in 2015 and he is now known as a Servant of God.

== Works ==
- Sancti Ambrosii Mediolanensis episcopi ..., Opera omnia, curante P.A. Ballerini, I-VI, Mediolani, e Typographia Sancti Josephi, 1875-1883.

Catholic Church titles
Preceded by Bartolomeo Carlo Romilli	Archbishop of Milan; 1859 — 1867	Succeeded by Luigi Nazari di Calabiana
