= Natalis (bishop of Milan) =

Archbishop of Milan in the mid-8th century

- Archbishop of Milan
- Church: Catholic Church
- Appointed: c. 746
- Term ended: c. 747
- Predecessor: Theodorus II
- Successor: Arifred

Sainthood
- Feast day: 13 May
- Venerated in: Eastern Orthodox Church; Roman Catholic Church
- Patronage: Milan, Italy

Natalis (Latin: Natalis, Italian: Natale) was Archbishop of Milan in the mid-8th century. He is venerated as a saint in the Eastern Orthodox Church and Roman Catholic Church. His feast day is May 13.

== Life ==
Natalis was in office as archbishop from 746 to 747, but also the years 750 to 751 or 740 to 741 are proposed by scholars.

Almost nothing is known about the life and the episcopate of Natalis. The main source of information about his episcopate was a gravestone which was placed in the church of San Giorgio al Palazzo in Milan and which was still extant in the 16th century. From the copies of such gravestone it is known that Natalis governed the church of Milan for fourteen months, that he died at 72 and that he founded the church of San Giorgio, having obtained a donation, probably from Ratchis, king of the Lombards.

Other traditional information about his life, such as his surname Marinoni and his scholarship in Latin and Hebraic, have no historical basis.

Natalis was buried in the nave of the church of San Giorgio al Palazzo. His relics were translated into the main altar of the same church in the 18th century by archbishop Giuseppe Pozzobonelli, and are still venerated there. His feast day is 13 May in the Roman Rite and 9 May in the Ambrosian Rite.
