= Bartolomeo Carlo Romilli =

Archbishop of Milan from 1847 to 1859

His Excellency Bartolomeo Carlo Romilli
- Archbishop of Milan
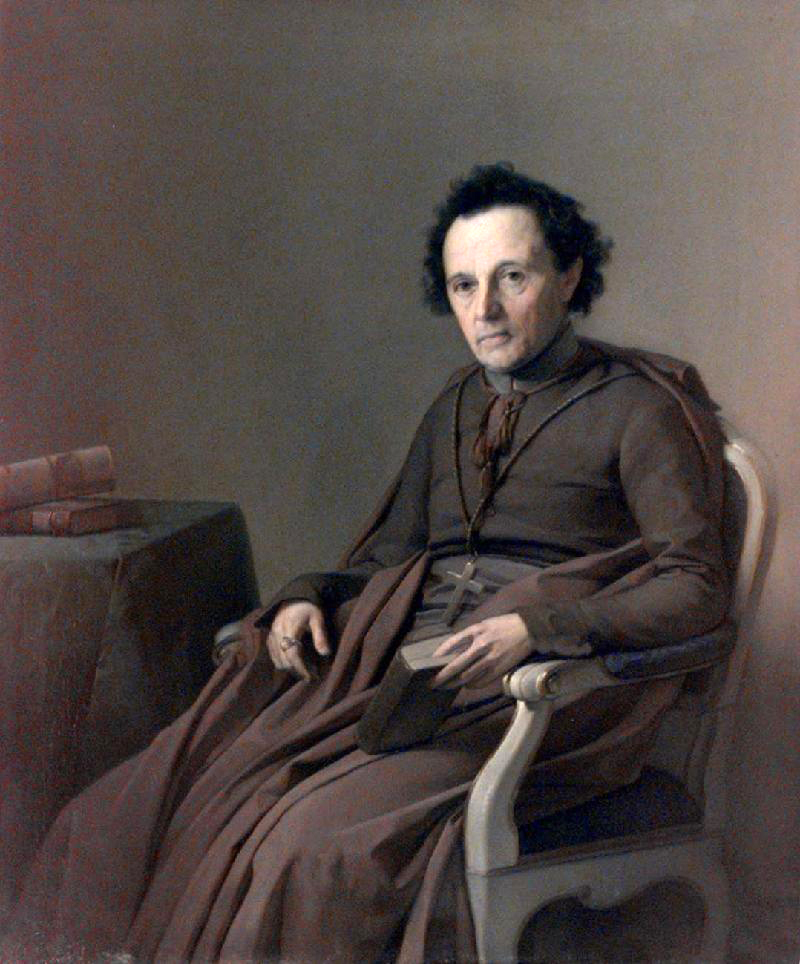
- Church: Catholic Church
- See: Milan
- Appointed: 14 June 1847
- Term ended: 7 May 1859
- Predecessor: Carlo Gaetano Gaisruck
- Successor: Paolo Angelo Ballerini
- Previous post: Bishop of Cremona (1846-47)

Orders
- Consecration: 21 June 1846 (Bishop) by Carlo Gritti Morlacchi

Personal details
- Born: 14 March 1795 Bergamo
- Died: 7 May 1859 (aged 64) Milan
- Buried: Cathedral of Milan

Bartolomeo Carlo Romilli (1795 - 1859) was Archbishop of Milan from 1847 to 1859.

== Life ==
Born in Bergamo in a noble family he was ordained priest in 1818 then in 1846 became Bishop of Cremona. In the summer of 1847 pope Pius IX named him Archbishop of Milan at the time of THE Kingdom of Lombardy–Venetia after Gaisruck an Austrian prelate. This appointment was welcomed by the people of his Archdiocese because after an Austrian prelate, an Italian was named to lead an archdiocese in a territory where there was a strong desire for independence from Austria. He died in Milan on 9 May 1859 during the Second Italian War of Independence.
