= San Giorgio al Palazzo =

Church in Milan, Italy

Coordinates: 45°27′39″N 9°11′02″E

Church of Saint George al Palazzo (Chiesa di San Giorgio al Palazzo)
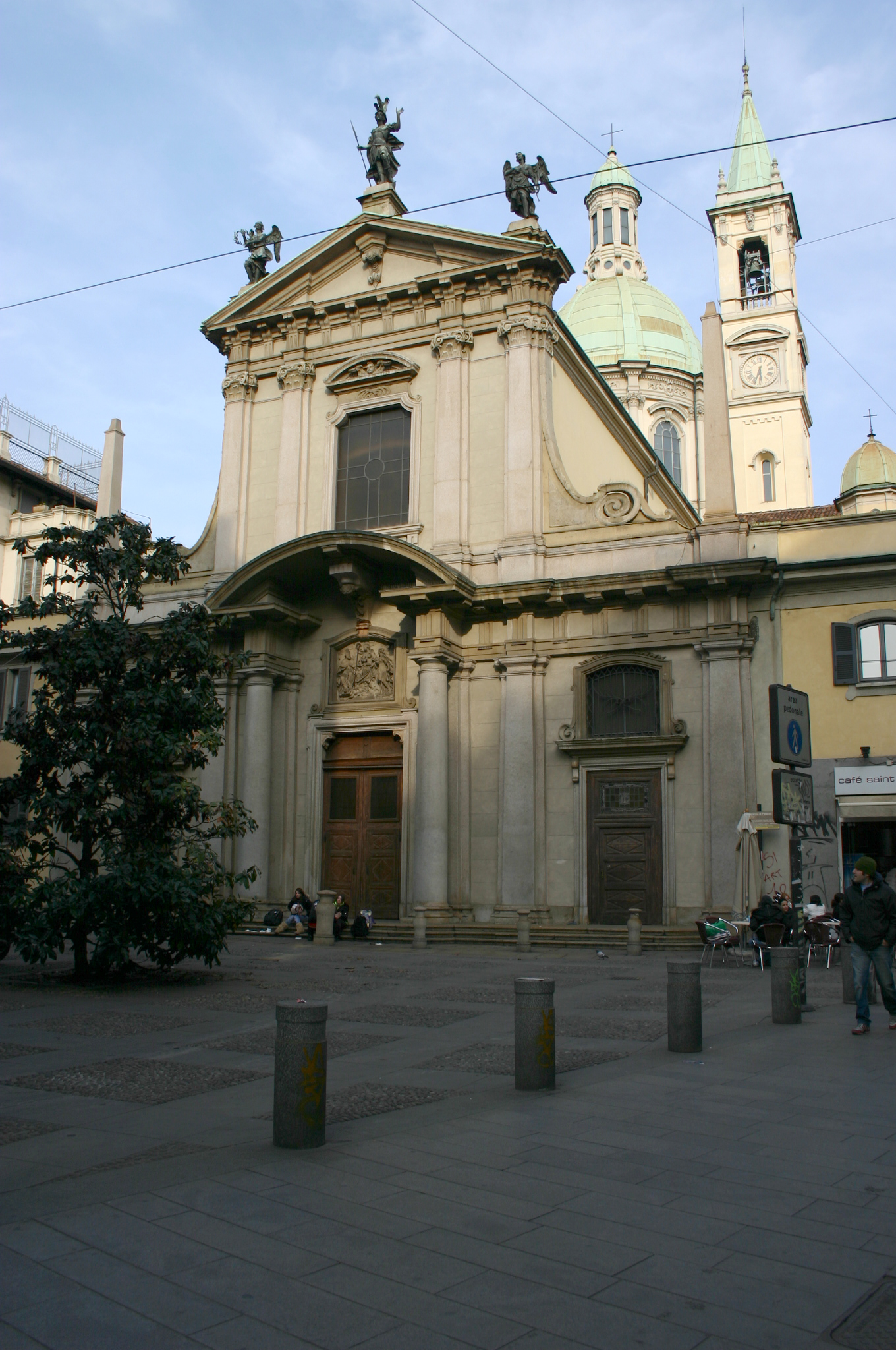
- Façade of the church.

Religion
- Affiliation: Roman Catholic
- Province: Milan
- Status: Active

Location
- Location: Milan, Italy
- Interactive map of Church of Saint George al Palazzo (Chiesa di San Giorgio al Palazzo)

Architecture
- Architect: Francesco Maria Richini
- Type: Church
- Style: Baroque
- Groundbreaking: c 750
- Completed: 1774

San Giorgio al Palazzo is a baroque-style, Roman Catholic church in central Milan, region of Lombardy, Italy.

== History ==
The church was founded around 750 by archbishop Natalis, and was modernized in Baroque style by Francesco Maria Richini in 1623. The façade, designed by Francesco Croce, was built in the 18th century.

The most striking feature of the interior is the Passion Chapel, with panels and frescoes painted by Bernardino Luini in 1516. In the first chapel on the right is a canvas by Gaudenzio Ferrari.

== See also ==
- Saint George: Devotions, traditions and prayers
