= Aicone =

Archbishop of the archdiocese of Milan

Styles of Aicone
- Reference style: The Most Reverend
- Spoken style: Your Excellency
- Religious style: Monsignor
- Posthumous style: none

Aicone (died 918) was an archbishop of the archdiocese of Milan.

== Life ==
Aicone is referred to as a strong supporter of Berengario I.

He died in Milan on 7 September 918.
