= Eustorgius II =

Catholic Saint; Archbishop of Milan from c. 511 to 518

- Archbishop of Milan
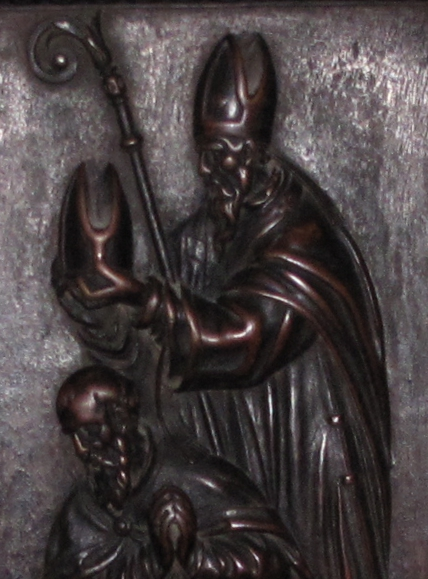
- Church: Catholic Church
- Appointed: c. 511 AD
- Term ended: 518
- Predecessor: Lawrence I
- Successor: Magnus

Personal details
- Died: 6 June 518

Sainthood
- Feast day: June 6
- Venerated in: Catholic Church

Eustorgius II (Italian: Eustorgio) was Archbishop of Milan from c. 511 to 518. He is honoured as a saint in the Catholic Church and his feast day is June 6.

== Life ==
We have two letters of king Theodoric the Great concerning Eustorgius: the first, addressed to the count and senator Adilas, urges Eustorgius to take under his protection the estates owned by the Church of Milan in Sicily, and the second, directly addressed to Eustorgius, asks the bishop to restore the bishop of Aosta who had been unjustly accused by some clergy of treason. Eustorgius was also asked to judge the slanderers.

In an own letter, Avitus of Vienne (died 518) thanks Eustorgius for the financial support given in order to free some Italian prisoners who were captured by the Arian Burgundians.

According to the bishop of Pavia Ennodius (died 521), Eustorgius restored the water ducts of the Baptistery of Santo Stefano, which ruins are still visible under the Cathedral of Milan.

Eustorgius died on 6 June 518. His remains were interred in the chapel of Saint Sixtus aside the city's basilica of St. Lorenzo Maggiore. His feast is celebrated on June 6 in such basilica and together with all the saint bishops of Milan on 25 September.
