= Basilica di San Calimero =

Church in Milan, Italy

Coordinates: 45.456626°N 9.192955°E

Basilica of Saint Calimerius (Basilica di San Calimero)
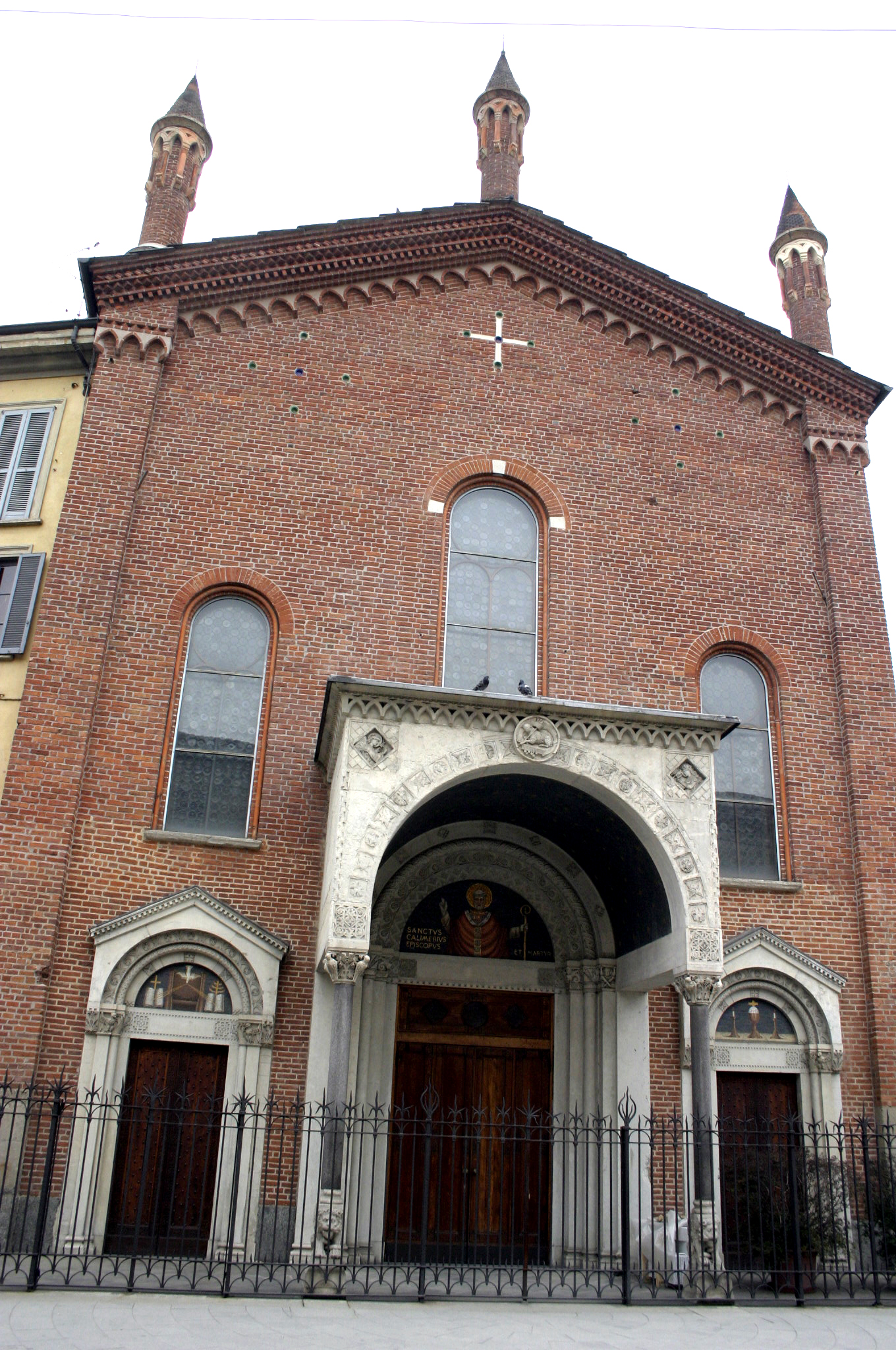
- The Neo-Romanesque façade of the basilica.

Religion
- Affiliation: Roman Catholic
- Province: Milan
- Year consecrated: 1776
- Status: Active

Location
- Location: Milan, Italy
- Interactive map of Basilica of Saint Calimerius (Basilica di San Calimero)

Architecture
- Architect: Angelo Colla
- Type: Church
- Style: Romanesque Revival
- Groundbreaking: 5c
- Completed: 1882

The Basilica di San Calimero is a church in Milan, northern Italy. Its name refers to Saint Calimerius (died 190 AD), an early bishop of the city. It dates from the 5th century but was almost completely rebuilt in 1882 by the architect Angelo Colla in an attempt to restore it to the "original" medieval structure.

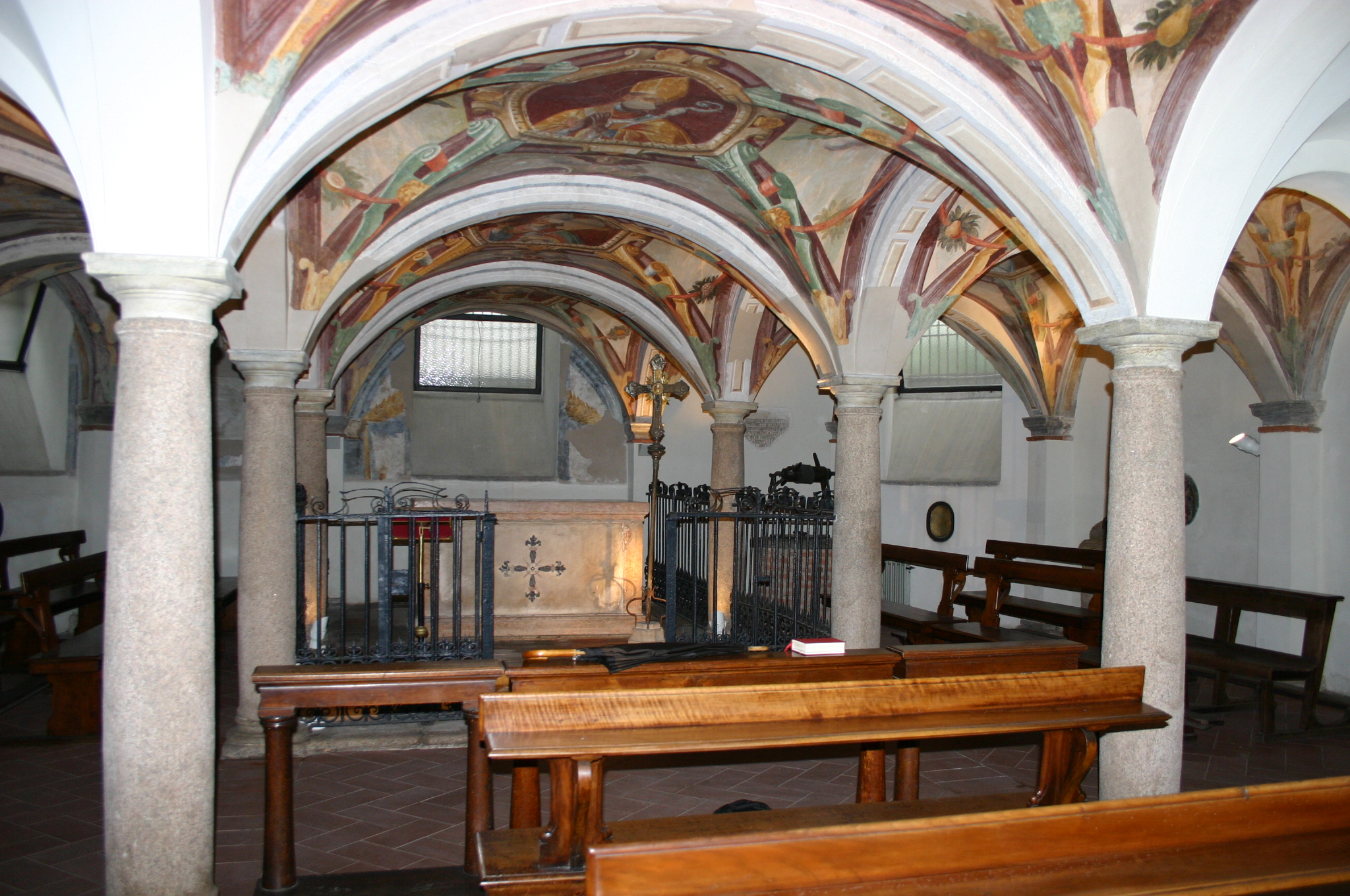
The 16th century crypt

What remains of the ancient church include: the 16th century crypt, with a noble frescoed vault by the Fiammenghini; a small fresco with the Madonna and Two Female Saints (15th century, attributed to Cristoforo Moretti) in the apse; a Crucifixion by Il Cerano, and a noteworthy Nativity by Marco d'Oggiono. Other medieval frescoes are in the annexed sacristy.

The crypt also houses Calimerius' relics and a pit located in the same place in which the former's bones were found in the water.

== See also ==
- Early Christian churches in Milan
