= Monas (bishop of Milan) =

Roman Catholic Saint and Archbishop of Milan

- Bishop of Milan
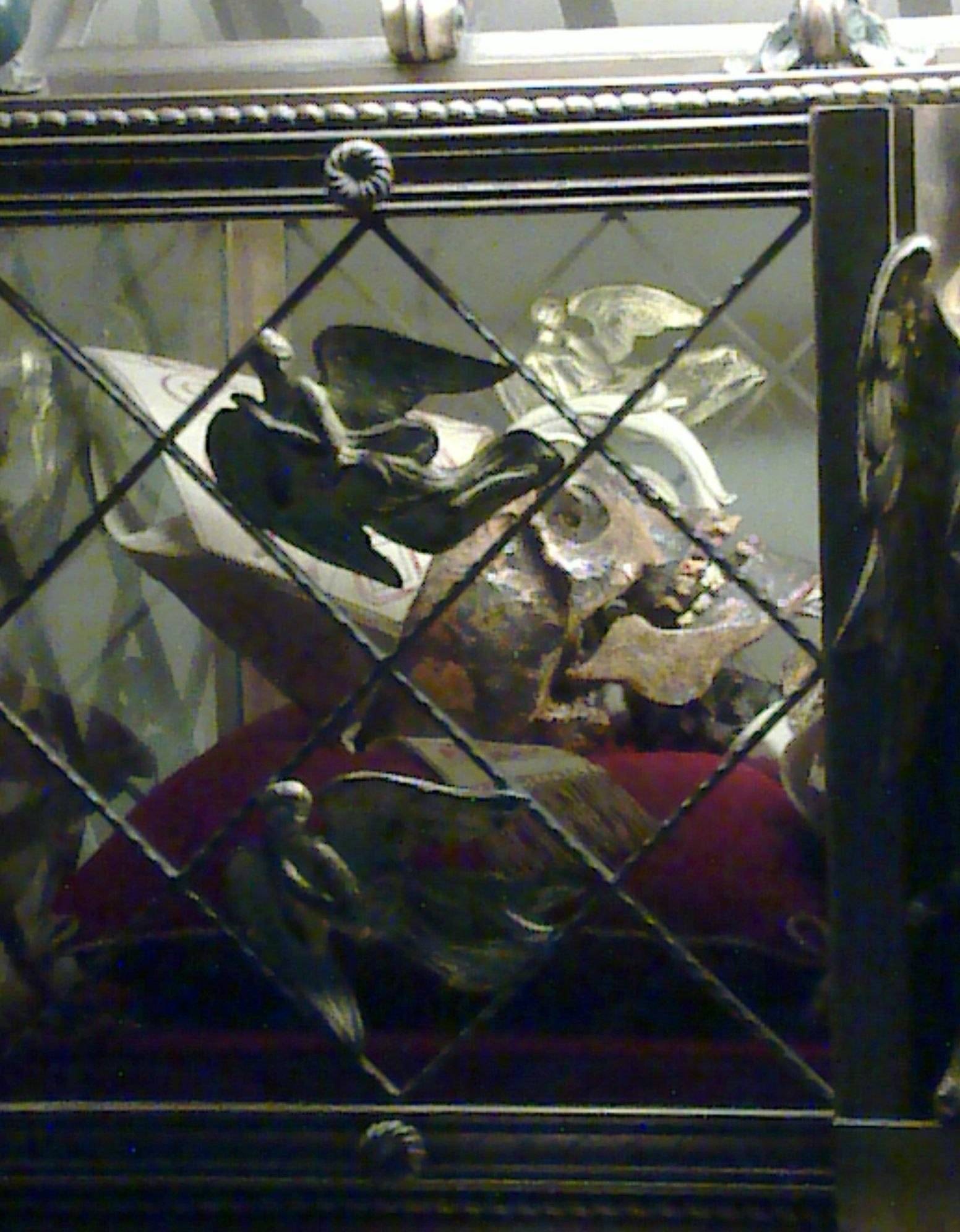
- relics of Saint Monas, Cathedral of Milan
- Church: Catholic Church
- In office: end 3rd – early 4th century
- Predecessor: Calimerius
- Successor: Mirocles

Personal details
- Born: c. 3rd century AD
- Died: c. 313 AD Milan, Roman Italy, Roman Empire

Sainthood
- Feast day: 12 October
- Venerated in: Catholic Church

Monas (Italian: Mona, born c. 3rd century AD - died c. 313 AD) was Bishop of Milan from the end 3rd-century to early 4th-century. He is honoured as a Saint in the Catholic Church and his feast day is on October 12.

== Life ==
Almost nothing is known about the life and the episcopate of Monas. He was elected as bishop of Milan in some year at the end of the 3rd-century (tentatively in 283), and his episcopate lasted until some time before the year 313, when Mirocles was the bishop of Milan.

Monas died on 25 March (the exact year was not recorded) and his corpse was buried near the church of Saint Vitalis of Milan (Basilica Fausta), in the area where now stand the Basilica of Sant'Ambrogio. Under the episcopate of Arnulf II (998-1018), on 12 October (the year was not recorded), his relics were discovered and translated into the church of Saint Vitale near the Basilica Naboriana (now demolished). On 6 February 1576 his relics were translated by Saint Charles Borromeo to the Cathedral of Milan where they are today.

A late tradition, with no historical basis, associates Monas with the Milan's noble family of the Borri. To Monas is attributed the foundation of the parish church of Corbetta. Monas is also venerated in a chapel, renovated in the 17th century by the Borri family, in the Santuario della Beata Vergine dei Miracoli of Corbetta.
