= Gariberto of Besana =

Roman Catholic archbishop

Styles of Gariberto
- Reference style: The Most Reverend
- Spoken style: Your Excellency
- Religious style: Monsignor
- Posthumous style: none

Gariberto da Besana (died 921) was an archbishop who led the archdiocese of Milan.

== Life ==
Gariberto was a relative of da Besana and his son seem to be his successor. Gariberto died on 5 July 921.
